= 2014 Critérium du Dauphiné =

2014 UCI World Tour, race 16 of 29

Race details
- Dates: 8–15 June 2014
- Stages: 8
- Distance: 1,187.4 km (737.8 mi)
- Winning time: 31h 08' 08"

Results
Jersey awarded to the overall winner	Winner	Andrew Talansky (USA)	(Garmin–Sharp)
	Second	Alberto Contador (ESP)	(Tinkoff–Saxo)
	Third	Jurgen Van den Broeck (BEL)	(Lotto–Belisol)
Jersey awarded to the points classification winner	Points	Chris Froome (GBR)	(Team Sky)
Jersey awarded to the mountains classification winner	Mountains	Alessandro De Marchi (ITA)	(Cannondale)
Jersey awarded to the young rider classification winner	Young rider	Wilco Kelderman (NED)	(Belkin Pro Cycling)
	Team	Astana	

The 2014 Critérium du Dauphiné was the 66th running of the Critérium du Dauphiné cycling stage race; a race, organised by the Amaury Sport Organisation, rated as a World Tour event on the UCI calendar, the highest classification such an event can have. The race consisted of eight stages, covering a distance of 1,187.4 km (737.8 mi), beginning on 8 June in Lyon and concluding in Courchevel on 15 June. The Dauphiné was viewed as a great preparation for July's Tour de France and a number of the contenders for the general classification of the Tour participated in the Dauphiné.

== Teams ==
As the Critérium du Dauphiné is a UCI World Tour event, all eighteen UCI ProTeams are invited automatically and obligated to send a squad with three other squads given wildcard places.

- Ag2r–La Mondiale
- Astana
- Belkin Pro Cycling
- BMC Racing Team
- Cannondale
- Cofidis*
- Team Europcar
- FDJ.fr
- Garmin–Sharp
- Giant–Shimano
- IAM Cycling*
- Team Katusha
- Lampre–Merida
- Lotto–Belisol
- Movistar Team
- NetApp–Endura*
- Omega Pharma–Quick-Step
- Orica–GreenEDGE
- Team Sky
- Tinkoff–Saxo
- Trek Factory Racing

== Route ==
Stage characteristics and winners
Stage	Date	Course	Distance	Type	Winner
1	8 June	Lyon to Lyon	10.4 km (6.5 mi)	Individual time trial	Chris Froome (GBR)
2	9 June	Tarare to Pays d'Olliergues-Col du Béal	156 km (96.9 mi)	Mountain stage	Chris Froome (GBR)
3	10 June	Ambert to Le Teil	194 km (120.5 mi)	Flat stage	Nikias Arndt (GER)
4	11 June	Montélimar to Gap	167.5 km (104.1 mi)	Medium-mountain stage	Yuri Trofimov (RUS)
5	12 June	Sisteron to La Mure	189.5 km (117.7 mi)	Medium-mountain stage	Simon Špilak (SLO)
6	13 June	Grenoble to Poisy	178.5 km (110.9 mi)	Flat stage	Jan Bakelants (BEL)
7	14 June	Ville-la-Grand to Finhaut-Emosson (Switzerland)	160 km (99.4 mi)	Mountain stage	Lieuwe Westra (NED)
8	15 June	Megève to Courchevel-Le Praz	131.5 km (81.7 mi)	Medium-mountain stage	Mikel Nieve (ESP)

== Stages ==
=== Stage 1 ===
8 June 2014 — Lyon to Lyon, 10.4 km (6.5 mi), individual time trial (ITT)

The Critérium du Dauphiné began with a 10.4 km (6.5 mi) time trial on the streets of Lyon. Intermediate times were taken at 4.6 km (2.9 mi), at the top of the only hill, to decide the rankings in the mountains competition. Chris Froome, the defending champion, won the stage by eight seconds over his arch-rival and fellow GC contender, Alberto Contador. Contador managed to knock Bob Jungels off the hot seat when he beat Jungels' time by one second after Jungels was on the hot seat for a long time. Another main GC contender, Vincenzo Nibali, took the fastest time at the top of the hill to take the lead in the mountains classification. However, he was not able to beat Contador at the finish as he eventually finished eighth on the stage, five seconds behind Contador's time. However, the best performance was left to Froome. Finishing second at the intermediate time-check, Froome eventually beat Contador's time by eight seconds to take the yellow-and-blue jersey for the general classification and the green jersey for the points classification after the first stage.

Stage 1 Result and General Classification after Stage 1

	Rider	Team	Time
1	Chris Froome (GBR)	Team Sky	13' 13"
2	Alberto Contador (ESP)	Tinkoff–Saxo	+ 8"
3	Bob Jungels (LUX)	Trek Factory Racing	+ 9"
4	Andrew Talansky (USA)	Garmin–Sharp	+ 11"
5	Wilco Kelderman (NED)	Belkin Pro Cycling	+ 11"
6	Lars Boom (NED)	Belkin Pro Cycling	+ 12"
7	Vasil Kiryienka (BLR)	Team Sky	+ 12"
8	Vincenzo Nibali (ITA)	Astana	+ 13"
9	Tejay van Garderen (USA)	BMC Racing Team	+ 13"
10	Matthias Brändle (AUT)	IAM Cycling	+ 13"

=== Stage 2 ===
9 June 2014 — Tarare to Pays d'Olliergues-Col du Béal, 156 km (96.9 mi)

Stage 2 Result

	Rider	Team	Time
1	Chris Froome (GBR)	Team Sky	4h 24' 41"
2	Alberto Contador (ESP)	Tinkoff–Saxo	s.t.
3	Wilco Kelderman (NED)	Belkin Pro Cycling	+ 4"
4	Jurgen Van den Broeck (BEL)	Lotto–Belisol	+ 10"
5	Andrew Talansky (USA)	Garmin–Sharp	+ 12"
6	Vincenzo Nibali (ITA)	Astana	+ 27"
7	Igor Antón (ESP)	Movistar Team	+ 40"
8	Adam Yates (GBR)	Orica–GreenEDGE	+ 42"
9	Sébastien Reichenbach (SUI)	IAM Cycling	+ 44"
10	Daniel Navarro (ESP)	Cofidis	+ 45"

General Classification after Stage 2

	Rider	Team	Time
1	Chris Froome (GBR)	Team Sky	4h 37' 44"
2	Alberto Contador (ESP)	Tinkoff–Saxo	+ 12"
3	Wilco Kelderman (NED)	Belkin Pro Cycling	+ 21"
4	Andrew Talansky (USA)	Garmin–Sharp	+ 33"
5	Jurgen Van den Broeck (BEL)	Lotto–Belisol	+ 35"
6	Vincenzo Nibali (ITA)	Astana	+ 50"
7	Haimar Zubeldia (ESP)	Trek Factory Racing	+ 1' 22"
8	Jakob Fuglsang (DEN)	Astana	+ 1' 22"
9	Adam Yates (GBR)	Orica–GreenEDGE	+ 1' 31"
10	Tanel Kangert (EST)	Astana	+ 1' 35"

=== Stage 3 ===
10 June 2014 — Ambert to Le Teil, 194 km (120.5 mi)

Stage 3 Result

	Rider	Team	Time
1	Nikias Arndt (GER)	Giant–Shimano	5h 30' 03"
2	Kris Boeckmans (BEL)	Lotto–Belisol	s.t.
3	Reinardt Janse van Rensburg (RSA)	Giant–Shimano	s.t.
4	Yannick Martinez (FRA)	Team Europcar	s.t.
5	Davide Cimolai (ITA)	Lampre–Merida	s.t.
6	Jens Keukeleire (BEL)	Orica–GreenEDGE	s.t.
7	Alexey Tsatevich (RUS)	Team Katusha	s.t.
8	Arnaud Démare (FRA)	FDJ.fr	s.t.
9	Gianni Meersman (BEL)	Omega Pharma–Quick-Step	s.t.
10	Marco Marcato (ITA)	Cannondale	s.t.

General Classification after Stage 3

	Rider	Team	Time
1	Chris Froome (GBR)	Team Sky	10h 07' 47"
2	Alberto Contador (ESP)	Tinkoff–Saxo	+ 12"
3	Wilco Kelderman (NED)	Belkin Pro Cycling	+ 21"
4	Andrew Talansky (USA)	Garmin–Sharp	+ 33"
5	Jurgen Van den Broeck (BEL)	Lotto–Belisol	+ 35"
6	Vincenzo Nibali (ITA)	Astana	+ 50"
7	Haimar Zubeldia (ESP)	Trek Factory Racing	+ 1' 22"
8	Jakob Fuglsang (DEN)	Astana	+ 1' 22"
9	Adam Yates (GBR)	Orica–GreenEDGE	+ 1' 31"
10	Tanel Kangert (EST)	Astana	+ 1' 35"

=== Stage 4 ===
11 June 2014 — Montélimar to Gap, 167.5 km (104.1 mi)

Stage 4 Result

	Rider	Team	Time
1	Yuri Trofimov (RUS)	Team Katusha	3h 59' 22"
2	Gustav Larsson (SWE)	IAM Cycling	+ 23"
3	Pim Ligthart (NED)	Lotto–Belisol	+ 25"
4	Lars Petter Nordhaug (NOR)	Belkin Pro Cycling	+ 28"
5	Peter Velits (SVK)	BMC Racing Team	+ 28"
6	Maxime Bouet (FRA)	Ag2r–La Mondiale	+ 28"
7	Jan Bakelants (BEL)	Omega Pharma–Quick-Step	+ 28"
8	Damiano Caruso (ITA)	Cannondale	+ 28"
9	Andriy Hryvko (UKR)	Astana	+ 1' 31"
10	Ryder Hesjedal (CAN)	Garmin–Sharp	+ 1' 31"

General Classification after Stage 4

	Rider	Team	Time
1	Chris Froome (GBR)	Team Sky	14h 09' 19"
2	Alberto Contador (ESP)	Tinkoff–Saxo	+ 12"
3	Wilco Kelderman (NED)	Belkin Pro Cycling	+ 21"
4	Andrew Talansky (USA)	Garmin–Sharp	+ 33"
5	Jurgen Van den Broeck (BEL)	Lotto–Belisol	+ 35"
6	Vincenzo Nibali (ITA)	Astana	+ 50"
7	Maxime Bouet (FRA)	Ag2r–La Mondiale	+ 1' 01"
8	Haimar Zubeldia (ESP)	Trek Factory Racing	+ 1' 22"
9	Jakob Fuglsang (DEN)	Astana	+ 1' 22"
10	Adam Yates (GBR)	Orica–GreenEDGE	+ 1' 31"

=== Stage 5 ===
12 June 2014 — Sisteron to La Mure, 189.5 km (117.7 mi)

Stage 5 Result

	Rider	Team	Time
1	Simon Špilak (SLO)	Team Katusha	4h 51' 24"
2	Wilco Kelderman (NED)	Belkin Pro Cycling	+ 14"
3	Adam Yates (GBR)	Orica–GreenEDGE	+ 14"
4	Daryl Impey (RSA)	Orica–GreenEDGE	+ 17"
5	Romain Bardet (FRA)	Ag2r–La Mondiale	+ 17"
6	Daniel Moreno (ESP)	Team Katusha	+ 17"
7	Tanel Kangert (EST)	Astana	+ 17"
8	Damiano Caruso (ITA)	Cannondale	+ 17"
9	Arthur Vichot (FRA)	FDJ.fr	+ 17"
10	Leopold König (CZE)	NetApp–Endura	+ 17"

General Classification after Stage 5

	Rider	Team	Time
1	Chris Froome (GBR)	Team Sky	19h 01' 00"
2	Alberto Contador (ESP)	Tinkoff–Saxo	+ 12"
3	Wilco Kelderman (NED)	Belkin Pro Cycling	+ 12"
4	Andrew Talansky (USA)	Garmin–Sharp	+ 33"
5	Jurgen Van den Broeck (BEL)	Lotto–Belisol	+ 35"
6	Vincenzo Nibali (ITA)	Astana	+ 50"
7	Haimar Zubeldia (ESP)	Trek Factory Racing	+ 1' 22"
8	Jakob Fuglsang (DEN)	Astana	+ 1' 22"
9	Adam Yates (GBR)	Orica–GreenEDGE	+ 1' 24"
10	Tanel Kangert (EST)	Astana	+ 1' 35"

=== Stage 6 ===
13 June 2014 — Grenoble to Poisy, 178.5 km (110.9 mi)

Stage 6 Result

	Rider	Team	Time
1	Jan Bakelants (BEL)	Omega Pharma–Quick-Step	4h 07' 20"
2	Lieuwe Westra (NED)	Astana	s.t.
3	Zdeněk Štybar (CZE)	Omega Pharma–Quick-Step	+ 24"
4	Pim Ligthart (NED)	Lotto–Belisol	+ 24"
5	Jens Keukeleire (BEL)	Orica–GreenEDGE	+ 24"
6	Jens Voigt (GER)	Trek Factory Racing	+ 24"
7	Maciej Bodnar (POL)	Cannondale	+ 24"
8	Bram Tankink (NED)	Belkin Pro Cycling	+ 24"
9	Valerio Conti (ITA)	Lampre–Merida	+ 24"
10	Julien Simon (FRA)	Cofidis	+ 24"

General Classification after Stage 6

	Rider	Team	Time
1	Chris Froome (GBR)	Team Sky	23h 12' 15"
2	Alberto Contador (ESP)	Tinkoff–Saxo	+ 12"
3	Wilco Kelderman (NED)	Belkin Pro Cycling	+ 12"
4	Andrew Talansky (USA)	Garmin–Sharp	+ 33"
5	Jurgen Van den Broeck (BEL)	Lotto–Belisol	+ 35"
6	Vincenzo Nibali (ITA)	Astana	+ 50"
7	Haimar Zubeldia (ESP)	Trek Factory Racing	+ 1' 22"
8	Jakob Fuglsang (DEN)	Astana	+ 1' 22"
9	Adam Yates (GBR)	Orica–GreenEDGE	+ 1' 24"
10	Tanel Kangert (EST)	Astana	+ 1' 35"

=== Stage 7 ===
14 June 2014 — Ville-la-Grand to Finhaut–Emosson (Switzerland), 160 km (99.4 mi)

Stage 7 Result

	Rider	Team	Time
1	Lieuwe Westra (NED)	Astana	4h 32' 51"
2	Yuri Trofimov (RUS)	Team Katusha	+ 7"
3	Egor Silin (RUS)	Team Katusha	+ 16"
4	Alberto Contador (ESP)	Tinkoff–Saxo	+ 1' 33"
5	Andrew Talansky (USA)	Garmin–Sharp	+ 1' 51"
6	Ryder Hesjedal (CAN)	Garmin–Sharp	+ 1' 53"
7	Chris Froome (GBR)	Team Sky	+ 1' 53"
8	Vincenzo Nibali (ITA)	Astana	+ 2' 11"
9	Romain Bardet (FRA)	Ag2r–La Mondiale	+ 2' 16"
10	Sébastien Reichenbach (SUI)	IAM Cycling	+ 2' 19"

General Classification after Stage 7

	Rider	Team	Time
1	Alberto Contador (ESP)	Tinkoff–Saxo	27h 46' 51"
2	Chris Froome (GBR)	Team Sky	+ 8"
3	Andrew Talansky (USA)	Garmin–Sharp	+ 39"
4	Wilco Kelderman (NED)	Belkin Pro Cycling	+ 59"
5	Jurgen Van den Broeck (BEL)	Lotto–Belisol	+ 1' 14"
6	Vincenzo Nibali (ITA)	Astana	+ 1' 16"
7	Romain Bardet (FRA)	Ag2r–La Mondiale	+ 2' 11"
8	Sébastien Reichenbach (SUI)	IAM Cycling	+ 2' 14"
9	Jakob Fuglsang (DEN)	Astana	+ 2' 50"
10	Adam Yates (GBR)	Orica–GreenEDGE	+ 2' 52"

=== Stage 8 ===
15 June 2014 — Megève to Courchevel-Le Praz, 131.5 km (81.7 mi)

Stage 8 Result

	Rider	Team	Time
1	Mikel Nieve (ESP)	Team Sky	3h 20' 29"
2	Romain Bardet (FRA)	Ag2r–La Mondiale	+ 3"
3	Adam Yates (GBR)	Orica–GreenEDGE	+ 5"
4	Andrew Talansky (USA)	Garmin–Sharp	+ 9"
5	Jurgen Van den Broeck (BEL)	Lotto–Belisol	+ 9"
6	Tejay van Garderen (USA)	BMC Racing Team	+ 15"
7	Wilco Kelderman (NED)	Belkin Pro Cycling	+ 32"
8	John Gadret (FRA)	Movistar Team	+ 36"
9	Daniel Navarro (ESP)	Cofidis	+ 41"
10	Alberto Contador (ESP)	Tinkoff–Saxo	+ 1' 15"

Final General Classification

	Rider	Team	Time
1	Andrew Talansky (USA)	Garmin–Sharp	31h 08' 08"
2	Alberto Contador (ESP)	Tinkoff–Saxo	+ 27"
3	Jurgen Van den Broeck (BEL)	Lotto–Belisol	+ 35"
4	Wilco Kelderman (NED)	Belkin Pro Cycling	+ 43"
5	Romain Bardet (FRA)	Ag2r–La Mondiale	+ 1' 20"
6	Adam Yates (GBR)	Orica–GreenEDGE	+ 2' 05"
7	Vincenzo Nibali (ITA)	Astana	+ 2' 12"
8	Mikel Nieve (ESP)	Team Sky	+ 2' 59"
9	Daniel Navarro (ESP)	Cofidis	+ 3' 04"
10	Jakob Fuglsang (DEN)	Astana	+ 3' 17"

== Classification leadership ==
In the 2014 Critérium du Dauphiné, four different jerseys will be awarded. For the general classification, calculated by adding each cyclist's finishing times on each stage, the leader received a yellow jersey with a blue bar. This classification was considered the most important of the 2014 Critérium du Dauphiné, and the winner of the classification was considered the winner of the race.

Additionally, there was a points classification, which awarded a green jersey. In the points classification, cyclists got points for finishing in the top 10 in a stage. For all stages, the win earned 15 points, second place earned 12 points, third 10, fourth 8, fifth 6, and one point fewer per place down to a single point for 10th. Points towards the classification could also be achieved at each of the intermediate sprints; these points were given to the top three riders through the line with 5 points for first, 3 for second, and 1 point for third.

There was also a mountains classification, the leadership of which was marked by a red and white polka-dot jersey. In the mountains classification, points were won by reaching the top of a climb before other cyclists. Each climb was categorised as either hors, first, second, third, or fourth-category, with more points available for the higher-categorised climbs. Hors catégorie climbs awarded the most points, with 20 points on offer for the first rider across the summit; the first ten riders were able to accrue points towards the mountains classification, compared with the first eight on first-category passes and the first six riders on second-category climbs. Fewer points were on offer for the smaller hills, marked as third-category or fourth-category.

The fourth jersey represented the young rider classification, marked by a white jersey. This was decided the same way as the general classification, but only riders born after 1 January 1989 were eligible to be ranked in the classification. There was also a classification for teams, in which the times of the best three cyclists per team on each stage were added together; the leading team at the end of the race was the team with the lowest total time.

Stage	Winner	General classification	Mountains classification	Points classification	Young rider classification	Team Classification
1	Chris Froome	Chris Froome	Vincenzo Nibali	Chris Froome	Bob Jungels	Team Sky
2	Chris Froome	Chris Froome	Kévin Reza	Chris Froome	Wilco Kelderman	Astana
3	Nikias Arndt	Chris Froome	Kévin Reza	Chris Froome	Wilco Kelderman	Astana
4	Yuri Trofimov	Chris Froome	Kévin Reza	Chris Froome	Wilco Kelderman	Astana
5	Simon Špilak	Chris Froome	Alessandro De Marchi	Chris Froome	Wilco Kelderman	Astana
6	Jan Bakelants	Chris Froome	Alessandro De Marchi	Chris Froome	Wilco Kelderman	Astana
7	Lieuwe Westra	Alberto Contador	Alessandro De Marchi	Chris Froome	Wilco Kelderman	Astana
8	Mikel Nieve	Andrew Talansky	Alessandro De Marchi	Chris Froome	Wilco Kelderman	Astana
Final		Andrew Talansky	Alessandro De Marchi	Chris Froome	Wilco Kelderman	Astana

Notes

- In stages 2–5, Alberto Contador, who was second in the points classification, wore the green jersey, because Chris Froome (in first place) wore the yellow jersey as leader of the general classification during those stages. In stage 6, Contador still wore the green jersey despite having dropped to third in the points classification. Wilco Kelderman rose to second in the points classification after stage 5, but wore the white jersey as leader of the young rider classification during stage 6.
- In stage 7, Jan Bakelants, who was second in the points classification, wore the green jersey, because Chris Froome (in first place) wore the yellow jersey as leader of the general classification during that stage.
