= Dolore =

River in France

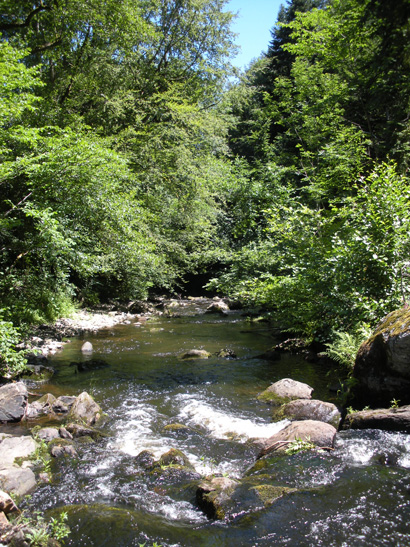

- Location within France Location within Auvergne-Rhône-Alpes

Location
- Country: France

Physical characteristics
- Source
  - location: Massif Central
- Mouth: Dore
  - coordinates: 45.4516°N 3.7327°E
- Length: 37.1 km (23.1 mi)
- Basin size: 70 km^{2} (27 mi^{2})
- Discharge
  - average: 1.18 m^{3}/s (42 cu ft/s)

Basin features
- Progression: Dore→ Allier→ Loire→ Atlantic Ocean

The Dolore (French pronunciation: [dɔlɔʁ]) is a French river in the Auvergne region. It originates in the monts du Livradois and joins the Dore, left bank; hence it is a sub-affluent of the Loire. It is 37.1 km (23.1 mi) long.

== Geography ==
The Dolore originates at Fournols, in the Livradois range. It flows southward until Saint-Bonnet-le-Chastel. It then turns east, before joining the Dore, left bank, downstream of Arlanc.

The entire river valley is part of the Livradois-Forez Regional Natural Park.

== Communes ==
Heading downstream, the river fares through :

- Fournols, Chambon-sur-Dolore, Saint-Bonnet-le-Chastel, Novacelles, Saint-Sauveur-la-Sagne, Mayres, Arlanc.

== Affluents ==
- Ruisseau des Moches
- Ruisseau du Forestier
- Ruisseau de la Farge (sometimes charted 'la Palle')
- Ruisseau de la Queue
- Ruisseau des Palles
- Ruisseau des Mons
- Ruisseau de la Combe
- Ruisseau de Beligeon

== Hydrology ==
Levels were recorded from 1965 to 2008 at Mayres, with a discharge of 1.18 cubic metres per second (42 cu ft/s), 10 kilometres (6 mi) from its confluence with la Dore.

The river has well-marked seasonal discharge variations. High waters are in winter and spring especially, with average monthly scores of 1.53 to 1.71 cubic metres per second (54 to 60 cu ft/s), from December to May (peak in April). The rate drops considerably in June to 0.992 cubic metres per second (35.0 cu ft/s), and the rate remains low through September, when it declines to 0.538 cubic metres per second (19.0 cu ft/s). These monthly scores can also however vary yearly or over short periods.

Àt low water, the rate can drop to 0.033 cubic metres per second (1.2 cu ft/s), equivalent to 33 litres per second (8.7 USgal/s), after a five-year dry period.

Given the narrowness of the basin, floods can be quite important, which can reach maximal debits of 14, 21, 26, 31 and 36 cubic metres per second (1,300 cu ft/s) for periods of 2, 5, 10, 20 or 50 years respectively. The MID recorded at Mayres on August 1, 1980, was of 52.5 cubic metres per second (1,850 cu ft/s) and rose to a daily total of 22.8 cubic metres per second (810 cu ft/s) on March 18, 1988.

The basin has a yearly precipitation of 531 millimetres (20.9 in), which is above the national average of 320 millimetres (13 in) and even higher compared to the Loire at about 245 millimetres (9.6 in). The average debit hence reached 16.8 L/s/km².

== Ecology ==
Lush in trout, a fair part of the river is included in the Natura 2000 programme, a small colony of Freshwater pearl mussel still present. Though it suffers little from industrial, domestic or agricultural pollution, the resinous reforestation of its banks has led to acidification of its waters and spawn clogging.
