= Annet Genestier =

French missionary-botanist (1856–1937)

- Born: 16 April 1856; Chambon-sur-Dolore, France
- Died: 9 January 1937 (aged 80)
- Burial place: Sacred Heart Church, Zhongding
- Occupation: Catholic missionary of the Society of Foreign Missions of Paris

Annet Genestier (16 April 1856 – 9 January 1937, Chinese: 任安守; pinyin: Rén Ān shǒu) was a French Catholic priest of the Society of Foreign Missions of Paris and a botanist.

== Biography ==
Genestier was born in Chambon-sur-Dolore. He was ordained a priest on 5 July 1885 in the Roman Catholic Archdiocese of Clermont. On 7 October 1885, he departed for his mission.

Genestier came to Kangding in 1885. He arrived in Gongshan, Yunnan, in 1888. In 1896 he moved to Baihanluo, Yunnan. There he founded the Bahang Catholic Church in 1898. He also established a missionary post there in June 1899.

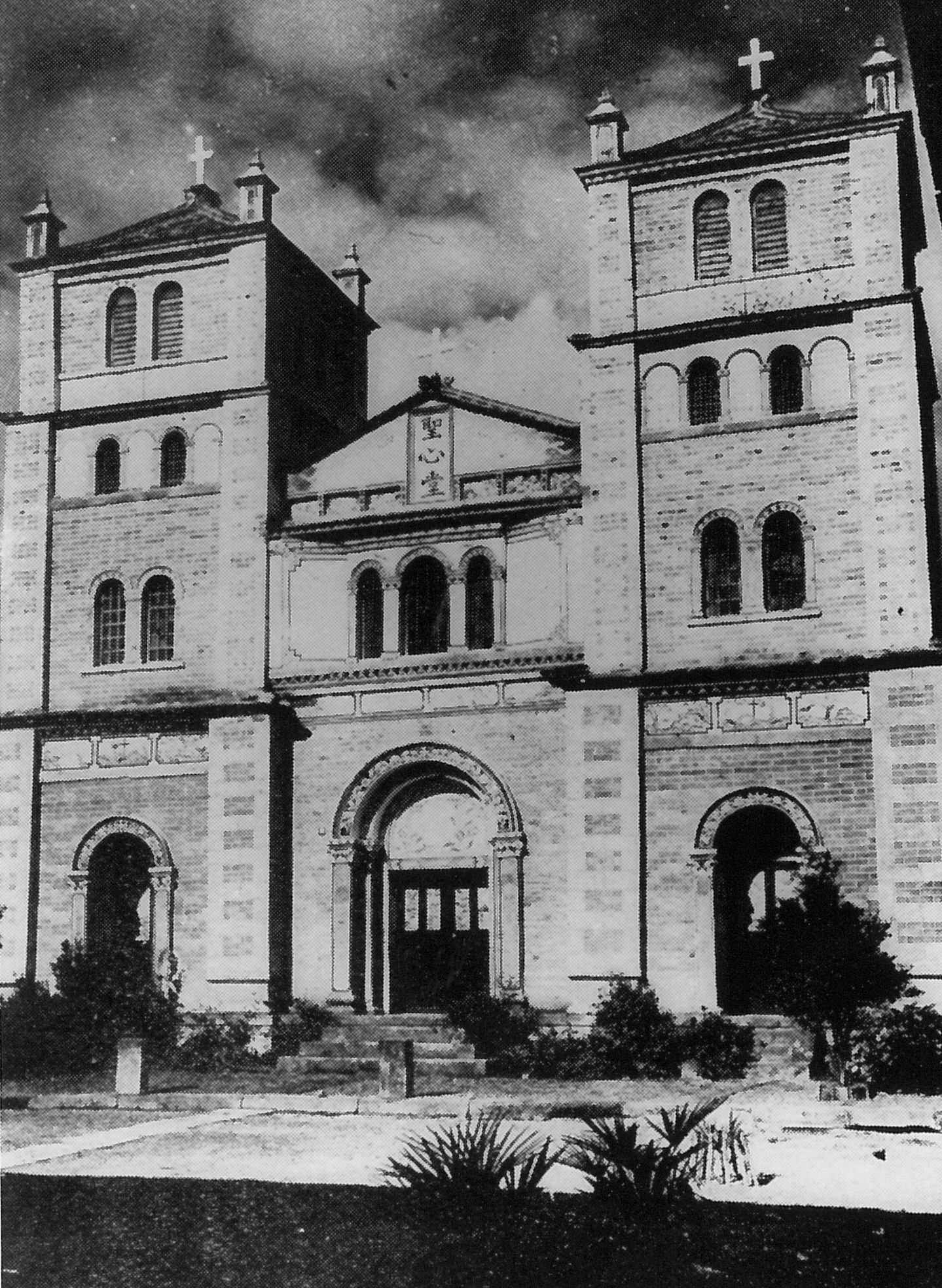
Genestier organized the construction of Sacred Heart Church at Zhongding.

In 1905, conflicts against Christianity broke out in Deqing, Yanjing, Zhongdian and Batang. In the same year, Genestier also wanted to build a church at Zhongding, Bingzhongluo, but he was opposed by the lamas at Puhua Temple (普化寺) and the locals. After another religious riot broke out in 1905 in Baihanluo and destroyed the church, Genestier went into exile until the Qing government granted him the fourth-rank of the official hat button (四品頂戴) in 1907. Using the compensation from the Qing government, he then rebuilt the Catholic Church in Baihanluo in 1908. In the same year, he also initiated the construction of the Sacred Heart Church, Zhongding.

Genestier was a "missionary-botanist" according to Jane Kilpatrick in her Fathers of Botany: The discovery of Chinese plants by European missionaries. She indicated that Genestier was the travel companion of André Soulié in the Tibetan borderlands. The botanist George Forrest mentioned Genestier in his "Journey on Upper Salwin, October-December, 1905" report. According to Beolens et al., Genestier received Francis Kingdon-Ward in 1913.

By 1924, Genestier had built five churches and formed a congregation of 978 locals. On 25 June 1925, Genestier officiated the 25th anniversary of the founding of the first missionary post on the Nujiang River.

Genestier died in 1937 and was buried at the Catholic Church in Zhongding. His tomb was destroyed along with the church complex during the Cultural Revolution and rebuilt later.

== Legacy ==
A subspecies of the Rusty-capped fulvetta, Alcippe dubia genestieri, was named after Genestier. It is synonymous with Schoeniparus dubius genestieri.

Genestier also published the following writings:

- "Thibet : voyage au Loutse-Kiang". Les Missions catholiques (in French). Lyon. 1899. pp. 157–59.
- "Thibet : expédition en pays inconnu". Annales de la Société des Missions étrangères (in French). 1904. pp. 268–76.
- "La mission loutsé". Annales de la Société des Missions étrangères (in French). 1929. pp. 20–30.
