= Dore (river) =

River in central France

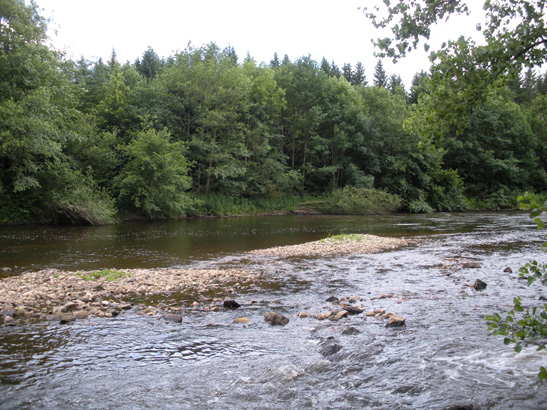
- upstream of Olliergues

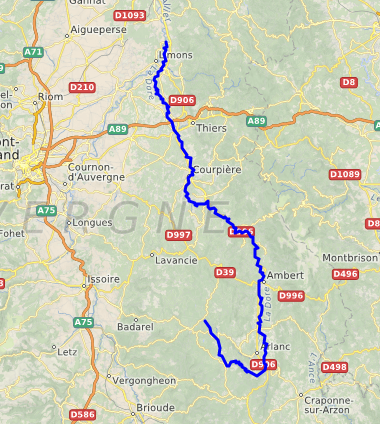

Location
- Country: France

Physical characteristics
- Source
  - location: Massif Central
- Mouth
  - location: Allier
  - coordinates: 46°0′34″N 3°28′26″E
- Length: 140 km (87 mi)
- Basin size: 1,523 km^{2} (588 sq mi)
- Discharge
  - average: 20 m^{3}/s (710 cu ft/s)

Basin features
- Progression: Allier→ Loire→ Atlantic Ocean

The Dore (French pronunciation: [dɔʁ]; Occitan: Dòra) is a 140 km long river in central France in the department of Puy-de-Dôme. It is a right tributary of the Allier. Its source is near the town of Saint-Germain-l'Herm in the Massif Central. The Dore flows generally north, through the following towns: Arlanc, Ambert, Courpière, and Puy-Guillaume. The Dore flows into the Allier 6 km north of Puy-Guillaume.

== Tributaries ==
Tributaries of the Dore, from source to mouth:

- Dolore (left)
- Miodet (left)
- Durolle (right)
- Vauziron (right)
