= Alberto Contador =

Spanish professional cyclist

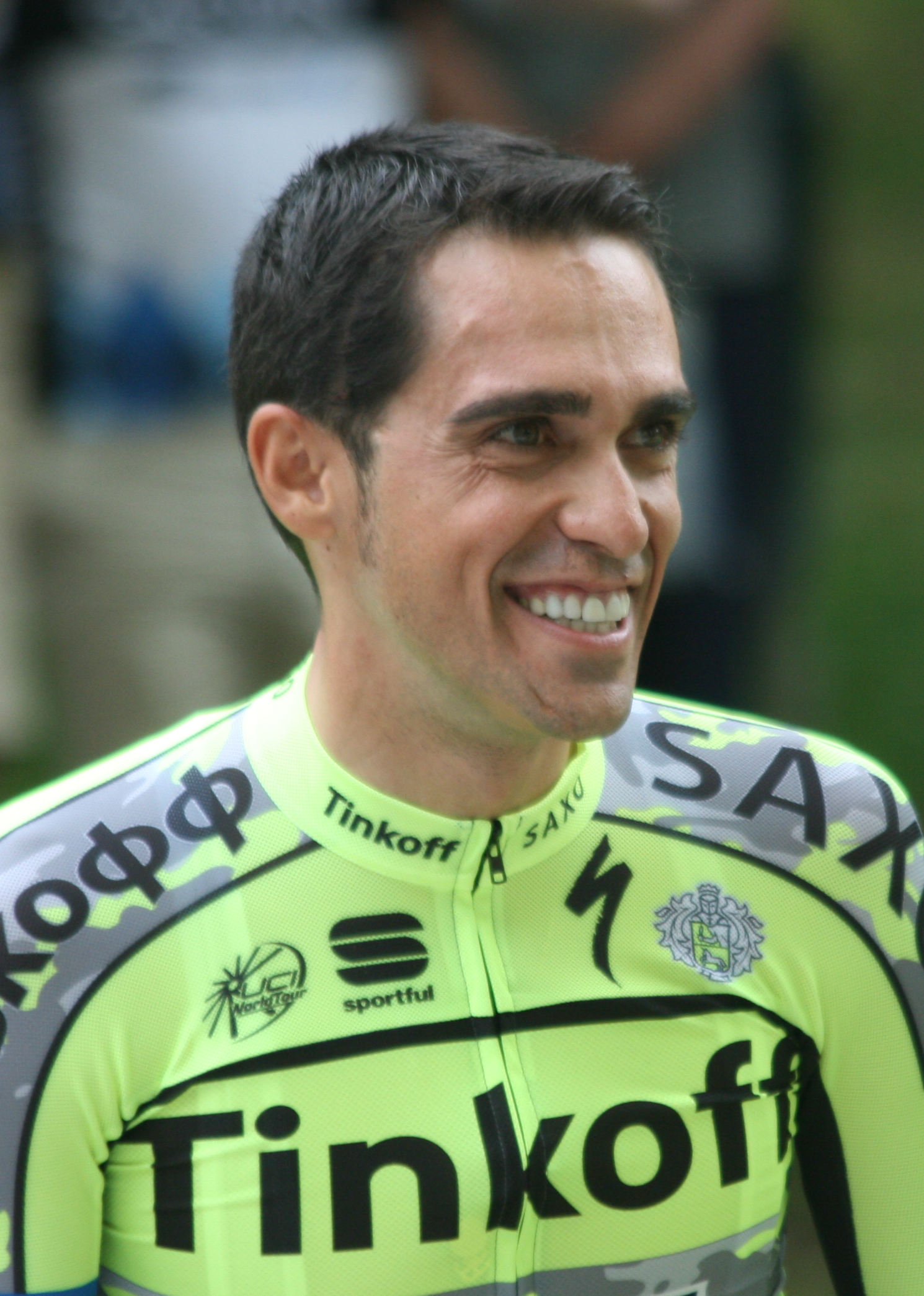
- Contador at the 2015 Tour de France

Personal information
- Full name: Alberto Contador Velasco
- Nickname: El Pistolero
- Born: 6 December 1982 (age 43) Pinto, Madrid, Spain
- Height: 1.76 m (5 ft 9 1/2 in)
- Weight: 62 kg (137 lb; 9 st 11 lb)

Cycling career
- Sport: Cycling
- Discipline: Road
- Role: Rider
- Rider type: All-rounder

Professional teams
- 2003–2006: ONCE–Eroski
- 2007: Discovery Channel
- 2008–2010: Astana
- 2011–2016: Saxo Bank–SunGard
- 2017: Trek–Segafredo

Major wins
- Grand Tours Tour de France General classification (2007, 2009) Young rider classification (2007) 3 individual stages (2007, 2009) Giro d'Italia General classification (2008, 2015) Vuelta a España General classification (2008, 2012, 2014) Combination classification (2008, 2014) 7 individual stages (2008, 2012, 2014, 2017) Stage races Paris–Nice (2007, 2010) Tirreno–Adriatico (2014) Tour of the Basque Country (2008, 2009, 2014, 2016) Vuelta a Burgos (2016) Volta ao Algarve (2009, 2010) One-day races and Classics National Time Trial Championships (2009) Milano–Torino (2012) Other Vélo d'Or (2007, 2008, 2009, 2014)

Alberto Contador Velasco (Spanish pronunciation: [alˈβeɾto kontaˈðoɾ βeˈlasko]; born 6 December 1982) is a Spanish former professional cyclist. He is one of the most successful riders of his era, winning the Tour de France twice (2007, 2009), the Giro d'Italia twice (2008, 2015), and the Vuelta a España three times (2008, 2012, 2014). He is one of only eight riders to have won all three Grand Tours of cycling, and one of only two riders to have won all three more than once. He has also won the Vélo d'Or a record 4 times.

He was regarded as the natural successor of Lance Armstrong and won the 2007 Tour de France with the Discovery Channel team. During his time at the Astana team, he won the 2008 Giro d'Italia, the 2008 Vuelta a España and the 2009 Tour de France. Between 2007 and 2011 he won six consecutive Grand Tours that he entered. This included winning the 2010 Tour de France with Astana, although it later emerged that he had tested positive for clenbuterol during the race. After a long battle in court, he was suspended by the Court of Arbitration for Sport and stripped of his 2010 Tour and 2011 Giro wins.

Contador was known as an attacking rider who excelled as a climber, and on his best days was also an excellent time-trialist. He was also known for being able to turn races around to his favour, most notably during the Fuente Dé stage at the 2012 Vuelta a España. Following his return from suspension, he won the Vuelta twice and the Giro once more. On the penultimate day of his career, he won a stage victory at the mountaintop finish of the Alto de l'Angliru.

== Personal life and early career ==
Contador was born on 6 December 1982 in Pinto in the Community of Madrid, the third of four children. He has an older brother and sister and a younger brother, who has cerebral palsy. Having previously taken part in other sports, such as football and athletics, Contador discovered cycling at the age of 14 thanks to his elder brother Francisco Javier.

When Contador was 15, he began to compete in races at the amateur level in Spain, joining the Real Velo Club Portillo from Madrid. Although he got no victories that year or the next, he demonstrated great qualities and was soon nicknamed Pantani (after Marco Pantani, regarded as one of the best climbers of all time) for his climbing skills. In 2000, he experienced his first victories, winning several mountains classification prizes from prominent events on the Spanish amateur cycling calendar.

He dropped out of school at the age of 16 without having finished his Bachillerato and signed with Iberdrola–Loinaz, a youth team run by Manolo Saiz, manager of the professional ONCE–Deutsche Bank team. In 2001, he won the under-23 race at the Spanish National Time Trial Championships.

Contador lives with his wife Macarena in the city of Pinto when not competing. He has a fascination for birds, keeping personally bred canaries and goldfinches at home.

== Professional career ==
=== ONCE–Eroski/Liberty Seguros (2003–2006) ===
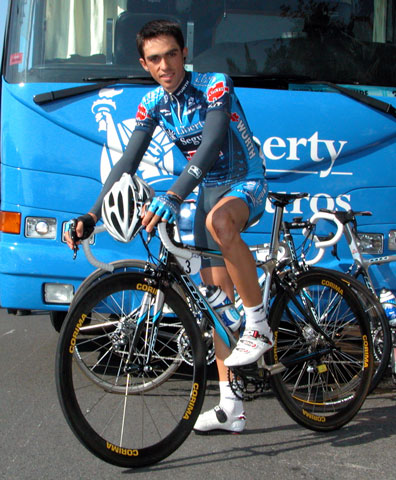
Contador with the Liberty Seguros–Würth team in 2006

Contador turned professional in 2003 for ONCE–Eroski. In his first year as a professional he won the eighth stage of the Tour de Pologne, an individual time trial. He deliberately let himself fall back on the morning's road stage and saved energy to deliver the winning effort in the time trial in the afternoon. During the first stage of the 2004 Vuelta a Asturias he started to feel unwell, and after 40 kilometres (25 miles) he fell and went into convulsions. He had been suffering from headaches for several days beforehand and was diagnosed with a cerebral cavernoma, a congenital vascular disorder, for which he underwent risky surgery and a recovery to get back on his bike. As a result of the surgery, he has a scar that runs from one ear to the other over the top of his head. Contador started to train again at the end of November 2004 and eight months after the surgery he won the fifth stage of the 2005 Tour Down Under racing for Liberty Seguros–Würth, as the team previously known as ONCE had become. He subsequently described this win as the greatest of his career. He went on to win the third stage and the overall classification of the Setmana Catalana de Ciclisme, thus winning his first stage race as a professional. He also won an individual time trial during the Tour of the Basque Country, where he finished third, and the fourth stage of the Tour de Romandie, where he finished fourth overall.

In 2006, he won stages at the Tour de Romandie and Tour de Suisse in preparation for the Tour de France. Prior to the start of the race he was implicated along with several teammates in the Operación Puerto doping case by the Spanish authorities, and the team was not able to start. He was later cleared by the Union Cycliste Internationale, cycling's governing body. Contador returned to racing in the Vuelta a Burgos but he crashed after finishing fifth in stage 4, when he was riding back down to the team bus, and briefly lost consciousness.

=== Discovery Channel (2007) ===
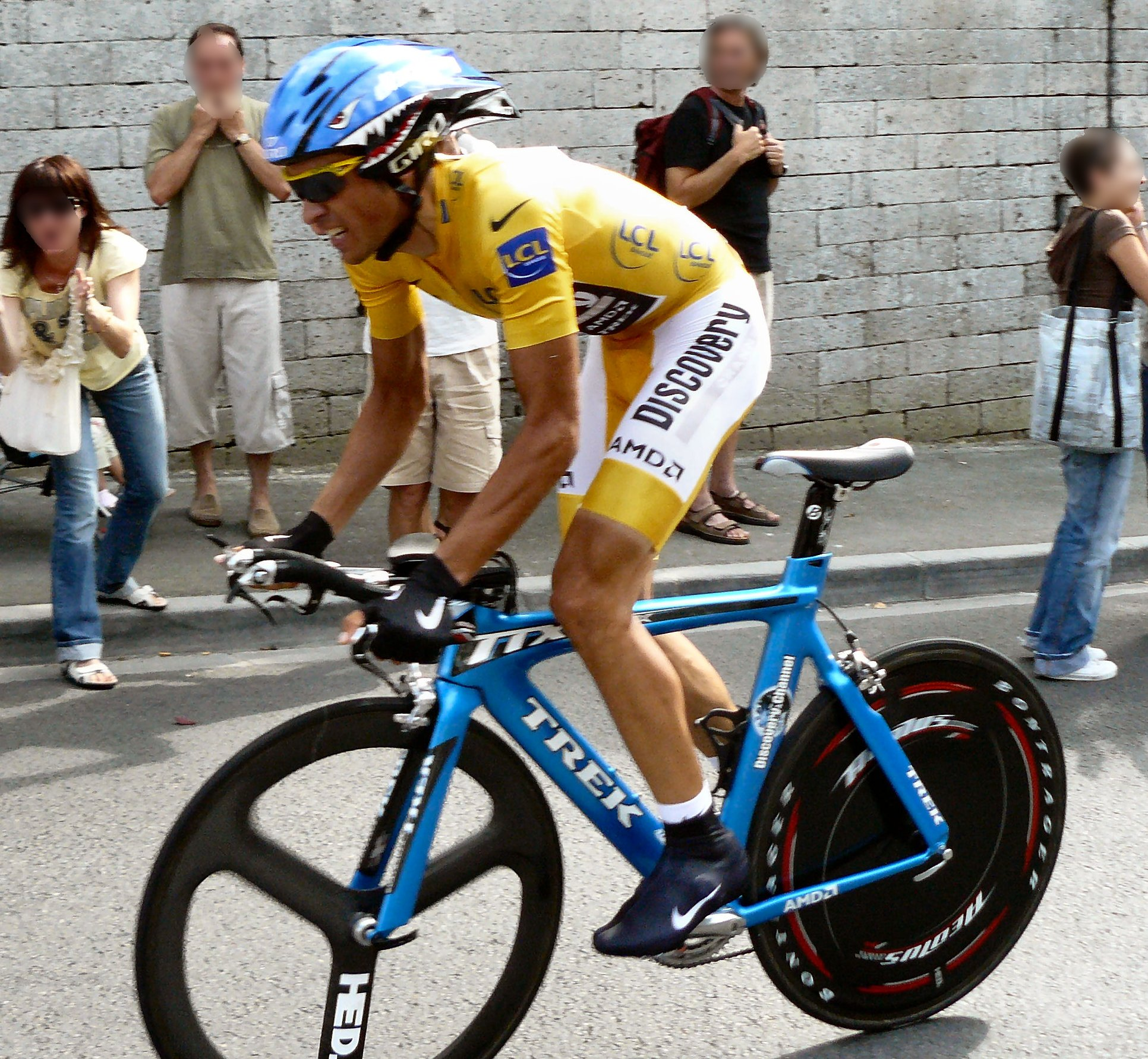
Contador wearing the yellow jersey during the 19th stage of the 2007 Tour de France.

After having been implicated in the Operación Puerto doping case, Contador was without a professional contract until mid-January 2007, when he signed with Discovery Channel.

Contador's first major professional victory came with Paris–Nice, which he won on the race's final stage. Discovery Channel effectively wore down the remnants of the race leader Davide Rebellin's Gerolsteiner team, allowing Contador to launch an attack on the final climb. With Rebellin leading the chase, Contador held off his competitors in the final kilometres, winning him the race.

In the Tour de France, he won a stage at the mountaintop finish of Plateau de Beille, and was second in the general classification to Michael Rasmussen. Upon Rasmussen's removal from the race before stage 17 for lying to his team about his pre-race training whereabouts, Contador assumed the overall lead and the yellow jersey, though he did not don it until after the stage. In the stage 19 individual time trial, he managed to defy expectations and keep hold of the yellow jersey by a margin of only 23 seconds over challenger Cadel Evans and 31 seconds over teammate Levi Leipheimer. As this was the Tour's penultimate stage, it was the last real competition of the race (since the final stage is traditionally non-competitive save for a bunched sprint to the finish line) and it secured Contador his first Tour de France victory. It is the closest the top three finishers in the Tour de France have ever finished to one another.

=== Astana (2008–10) ===
After Discovery Channel announced 2007 would be its final season in professional cycling, Contador announced on 23 October 2007 that he would move to the Astana team for 2008.

==== 2008 season ====
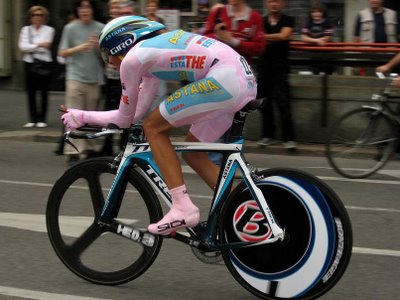
Contador wearing the pink jersey during the 21st stage of the 2008 Giro d'Italia.

On 13 February 2008, the organiser of the Tour de France, the Amaury Sport Organisation, announced that Astana would not be invited to any of their events in 2008 due to the doping previously perpetrated by Astana, despite the fact that its management and most of its ridership had changed before the 2008 season. Consequently, Contador was unable to defend his Paris–Nice and Tour de France victories. He went on to win his second Vuelta a Castilla y León, as well as the Tour of the Basque Country by winning the opening stage and the final individual time trial. His next scheduled race and objective was the Critérium du Dauphiné Libéré but his team received an invite to the Giro d'Italia one week prior to the start of the race. Contador was on a beach in Spain when he was told he was going to ride the Giro. Despite the lack of preparation, he finished second in the first individual time trial and took the pink jersey after the 15th stage up to Passo Fedaia. Upon winning the final pink jersey in Milan, he became the first non-Italian to win the Giro d'Italia since Pavel Tonkov in 1996 and also the second Spanish rider to win the Giro after Miguel Induráin won in 1992 and 1993. He later emphasized the importance of this win by saying that "taking part in the Giro and winning it was a really big achievement, bigger than if I'd had a second victory in the Tour de France".

At the 2008 Summer Olympics, Contador competed in the road race and the individual road time trial. He did not finish in the road race, in which 53 of the 143 starters did not complete the course in particularly hot and humid conditions. He placed fourth in the individual time trial, eight seconds behind his regular teammate Leipheimer.

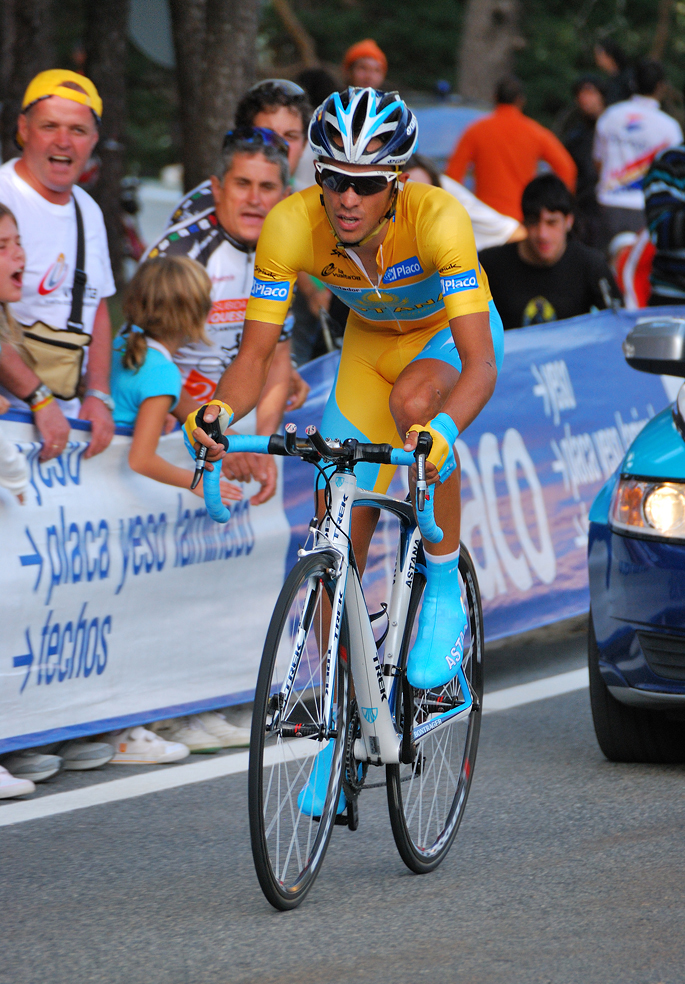
Contador wearing the golden jersey during the 20th stage of the 2008 Vuelta a España.

Contador entered the Vuelta a España as the main candidate to win. His biggest challenger was likely to be compatriot Carlos Sastre, who had won the Tour de France just a month before. Contador won stage 13 by attacking on the fabled Angliru climb and this resulted in him capturing the golden jersey as the leader of the race. He extended his lead by winning stage 14 to Fuentes de Invierno and maintained his lead in subsequent flat stages and the final time trial, won by Leipheimer by a wide margin. Contador later took some offence to Leipheimer seemingly riding with winning the Vuelta in mind, after it had been established earlier in the race that Contador was Astana's team leader. In the final standings, Contador finished 46 seconds ahead of Leipheimer and more than four minutes ahead of Sastre. The win made him the fifth cyclist, at that point, to win all three Grand Tours, after Jacques Anquetil, Felice Gimondi, Eddy Merckx, and Bernard Hinault. In the process he also became the first Spaniard, youngest (age 25), and shortest amount of time to accumulate all three wins (15 months). He also became only the third cyclist to win the Giro and the Vuelta in the same year, joining Merckx (who did it in 1973) and Giovanni Battaglin (who did it in 1981).

Later in the year, Contador won the Vélo d'Or award for the best rider of the year for the second consecutive season. The Giro and Vuelta winner beat Olympic time-trial champion Fabian Cancellara and Sastre in a vote by international cycling writers.

==== 2009 season ====
On 9 September 2008, Lance Armstrong announced that he was returning to professional cycling with the express goal of participating in the 2009 Tour de France. Astana manager Johan Bruyneel, Armstrong's former mentor and sporting director, said that he could not allow Armstrong riding for another team and later signed him. Contador hinted at the possibility of leaving the team if he was given a secondary role supporting Armstrong but Bruneel said in no uncertain terms that he would hold Contador to the terms of his contract but he also said "Alberto has had a magnificent year and is currently the best professional cyclist in the world", Contador was later given assurances by Bruyneel that he would remain team leader and decided to remain at Astana for the 2009 season. Contador later claimed the situation was drastically overblown by the media. Contador decided to miss the Giro d'Italia to focus on winning the Tour de France.

Contador started his 2009 season at the Volta ao Algarve race in Portugal, winning the overall classification, placing second on stage 3, and winning the decisive 33-kilometre (21-mile) individual time trial. He was in position to win Paris–Nice again after winning the prologue and the toughest mountain stage, but suffered a breakdown in stage 7, losing his yellow jersey to fellow Spaniard Luis León Sánchez. Contador and his Astana team later blamed the breakdown on Contador eating inadequately, leaving him without the energy to chase attacks. Contador finished fourth overall; he continued his build up to the Tour de France by racing the Critérium du Dauphiné Libéré. He put in a strong performance of the opening time trial and stayed in touch with race leader Cadel Evans on the longer time trial. However, the strong ride of compatriot Alejandro Valverde up Mont Ventoux distanced Contador and he rode to help Valverde take the Yellow Jersey while finishing comfortably in third place overall. On 26 June, Contador competed in the Spanish National Time Trial Championships. He stated that he entered the race in order to gain more experience on his new Trek time trial bike, but he came away with a convincing victory over Sánchez, the defending champion, winning by 37 seconds. This was his first national championship as a professional.

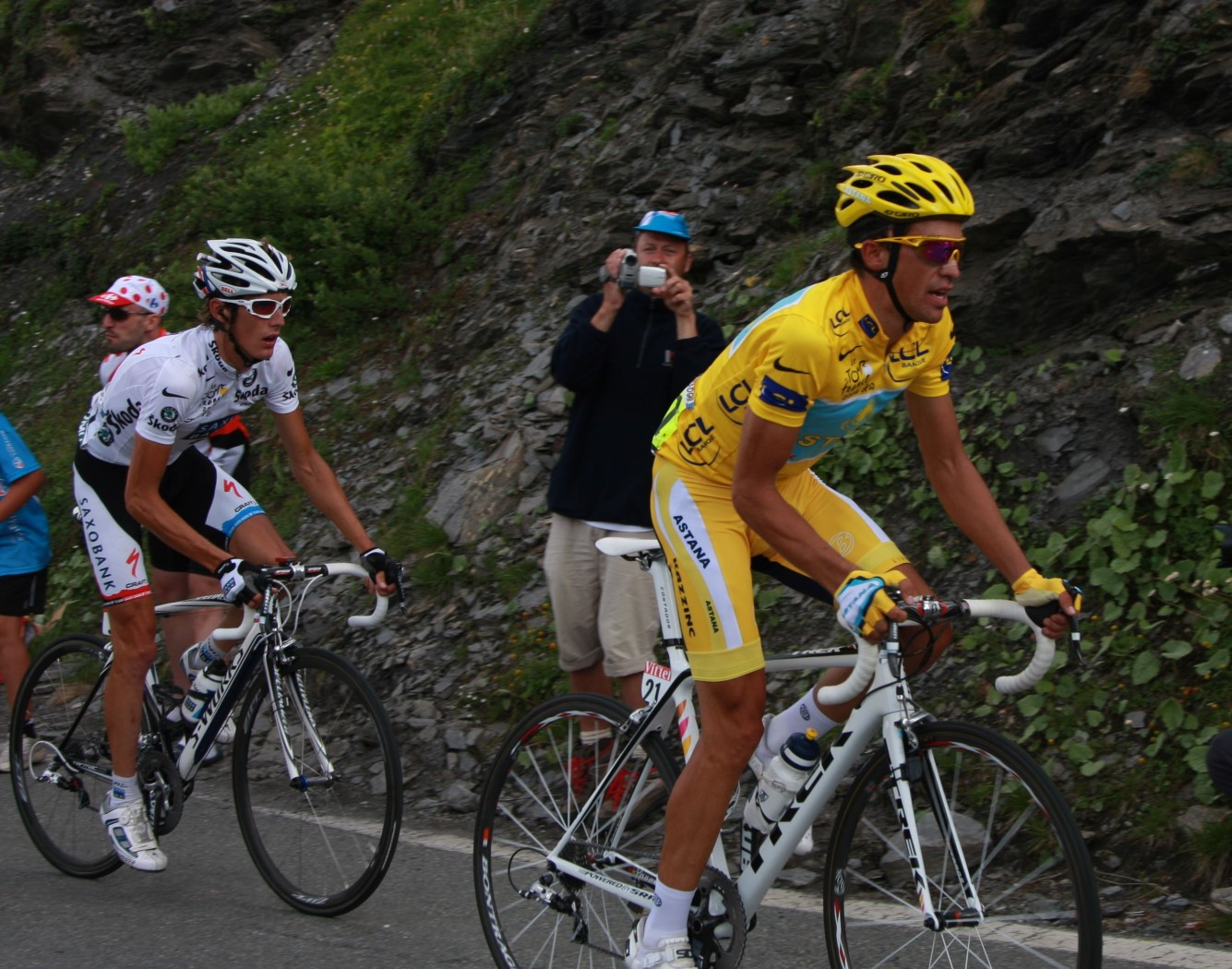
Contador wearing the yellow jersey leading Andy Schleck at the 2009 Tour de France.

Contador won Stage 15 of the Tour de France by soloing to the finish line more than a minute ahead of most of his closest general classification competitors, and in so doing took the yellow jersey. He then extended his lead on Stage 17, after finishing second in a breakaway of three riders with the same time as the stage winner, and then the next day he won the second time trial, increasing his overall advantage to more than four minutes. Contador won his second Tour de France on 26 July with a winning margin of 4' 11" over Andy Schleck, and finished 5' 24" ahead of Armstrong, who finished third in his return to the Tour after a four-year absence. Contador had won the last four Grand Tour races that he had entered. During the celebration at the podium, the organisers of the Tour wrongly played the Danish national anthem instead of the Spanish Royal March. In the aftermath of the tour, Contador and Armstrong engaged in a war of words, with Contador quoted as saying that, although Armstrong "is a great rider and [..] did a great Tour[, but] on a personal level [..] I have never admired him and never will", and Armstrong responding that "a champion is also measured on how much he respects his teammates and opponents." The sniping caused others, such as the director of the Tour, to wonder "what it would have been like to have had Contador and Armstrong in different teams." Contador later described the experience as "psychologically tough", likening it to having to compete in two races – one on the road, the other in the team hotel. Armstrong's control of the team during the race extended to its entire fleet of team cars, forcing Contador to rely on his brother to take him from stage finishes to the hotel.

On 31 July, Contador's agent (who is also his brother) announced that Contador had turned down an offer to remain with Astana under a new four-year contract because he had felt so uncomfortable being caught between the Kazakhstan owners of the team on one side and Bruyneel on the other, and he was hoping to leave Astana at the end of the year, although his contract did not expire until the end of 2010. However, on 11 August, Contador's teammate and close friend Sérgio Paulinho accepted a two-year contract with Team RadioShack, indicating that Contador might not be able to leave Astana as readily as he and his agent wished. This was confirmed on 15 August, when a spokesperson for the Kazakhstan sponsors of Astana said that they intended to sponsor the Astana team on the UCI ProTour through 2013 and that they intended to enforce the last year of Contador's contract with Astana in 2010.

==== 2010 season ====
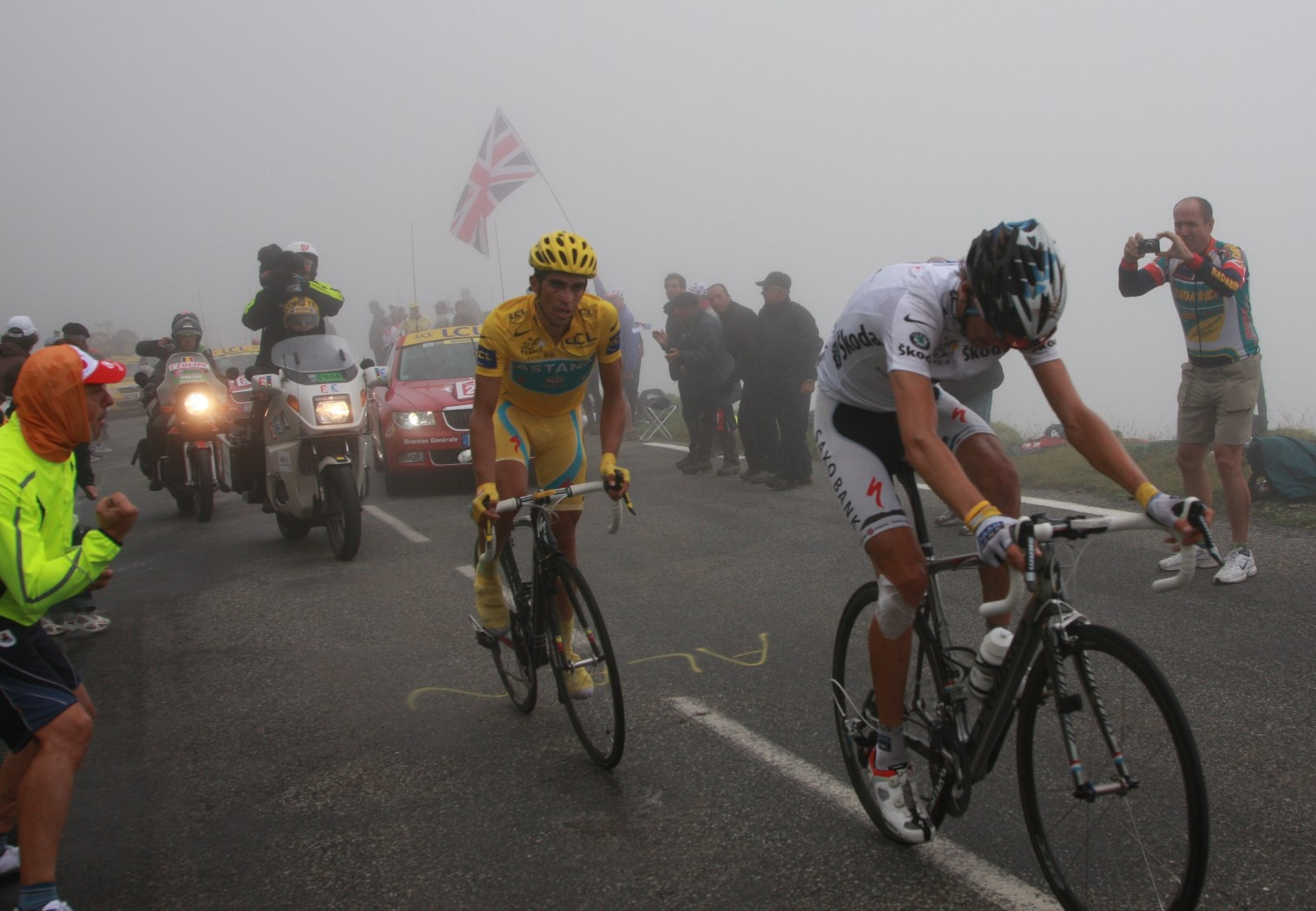
Contador wearing the yellow jersey following Andy Schleck on the Col du Tourmalet during the 2010 Tour de France. He was later stripped of this title.

On 21 February, Contador won his first race of the season, the Volta ao Algarve, by winning its queen stage and finishing second in the final time trial. Due to new UCI regulations concerning the nose cone of time trial bikes, Contador did not use his Shiv time trial bike, and instead used the standard red Specialized time trial bike. On 14 March, Contador won his second Paris–Nice, finishing ahead of other pre-race favorites like Alejandro Valverde and Luis León Sánchez. His main attack came in the hilltop finish to Mende, where he crossed the finish line alone and successfully secured the yellow jersey. Contador also competed in and concluded the Critérium International with a second place in the final time trial, only 2 seconds behind stage winner David Millar, while Pierrick Fédrigo successfully defended the maillot jaune against rivals such as Cadel Evans and Samuel Sánchez.

Contador was a favourite coming into the Tour de France, along with Team Saxo Bank's Andy Schleck. On Stage 15 Schleck was race leader and pressing the pace over the day's final climb of Port de Bales when he threw his chain. Contador and Denis Menchov immediately moved to the front and attacked, pressing the advantage over the crest of the climb and all the way back down into Bagneres-de-Luchon. They were aided by Samuel Sánchez and two others making a group of five riders. Schleck chased hard, but had no other riders to help bridge the gap. By stage's end, he had lost the yellow jersey and 39 seconds to Contador. Contador, who now had an eight-second lead in the race, met with a mixed reception as he received the yellow jersey on the podium at the end of the stage. It is an unusual occurrence in the Tour for the new race leader to be met with whistles and cat calls as he is given the yellow jersey. The yellow jersey changing shoulders made a large difference in the remainder of the race, for now the onus was on Schleck to attack Contador, and not the other way around.

Jered Gruber, writing for VeloNation, argued that Contador was right to attack, defending him on the basis that Schleck did not wait for Contador when he was delayed behind a crash on the cobblestones in stage 3 and lost 1' 13" to Schleck, a crash that cost Schleck the aid of his best ally in the tour, his brother Fränk Schleck. But of course that was early in the race and neither rider had the yellow jersey at the time. Race commentator Paul Sherwen thought the attack in poor form, whereas his co-commenter Phil Liggett thought not. Schleck said he considered Contador's actions to be unsporting. Hours after the conclusion of the stage, Contador voiced an apology for his behaviour on his YouTube channel. Five days later in the stage 19 time trial, Contador beat Schleck again, taking 31 seconds from him. Contador went on to win the Tour de France for the third time with an advantage of 39 seconds over Andy Schleck, the exact amount of time he had taken from Schleck on Stage 15. Contador became the seventh rider to win a Tour de France without winning a stage, but this win was later nullified due to his doping suspension.

=== Saxo Bank–SunGard (2011–16) ===
Contador signed a two-year contract with Saxo Bank–SunGard for the 2011 season, to ride under team manager Bjarne Riis, who revealed that he would like Contador to try winning all three Grand Tours in one season, a feat never before accomplished. Contador's agent and brother Fran later countered the statement by saying it was "nothing but a dream". Within two weeks, three of Contador's Spanish teammates signed to make the same transfer: Jesús Hernández, Daniel Navarro and Benjamín Noval.

==== 2011 season ====
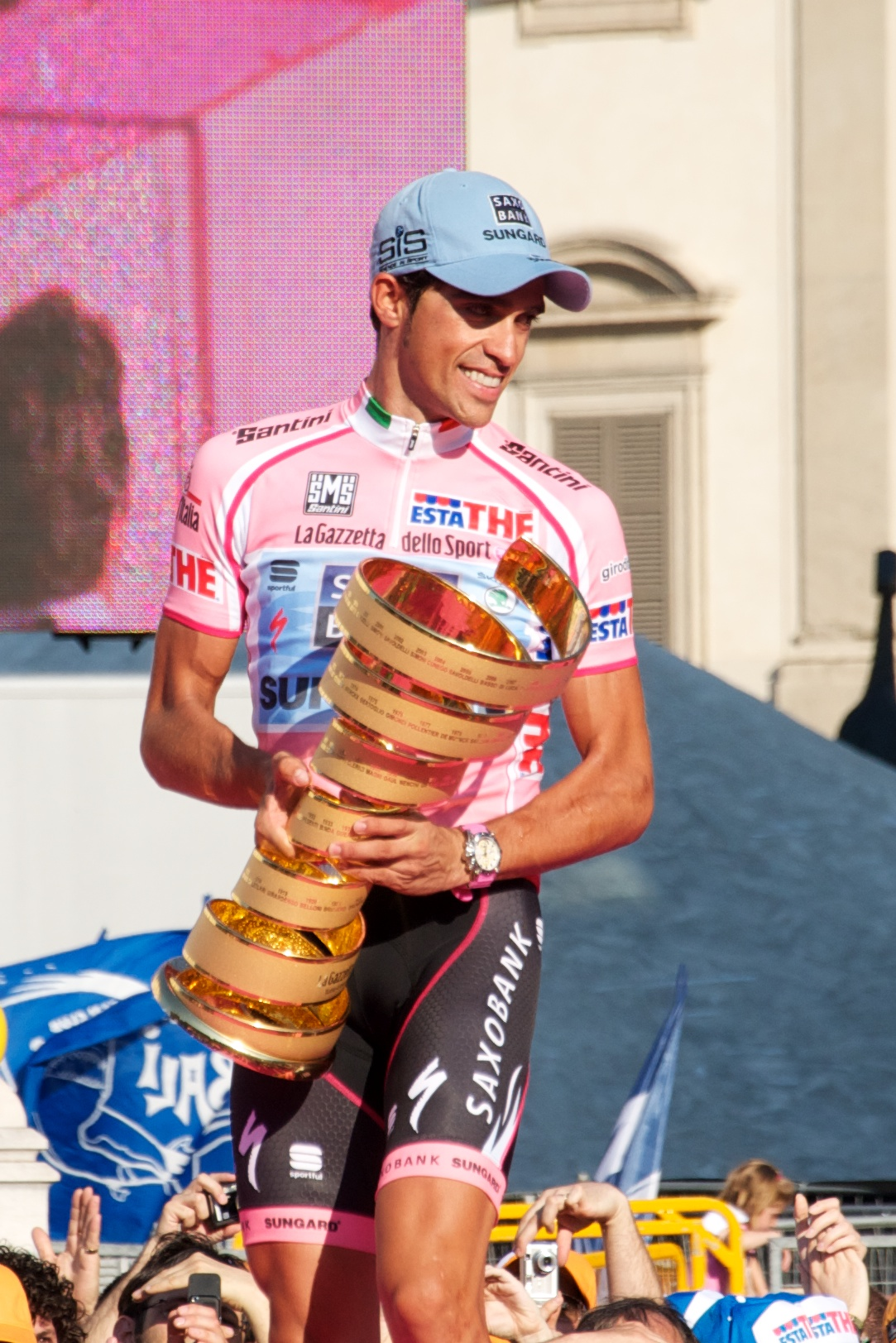
Contador, wearing the maglia rosa as the winner of the 2011 Giro d'Italia, in Milan. He was later stripped of this title.

Amidst the clenbuterol controversy, Contador earned his first win in the Vuelta a Murcia. He won the overall classification as well as two stage victories en route to his victory. Later in the month of March, Contador entered in the Volta a Catalunya, where he claimed a win on the third stage to Vallnord, maintaining his advantage until the end of the race. He also won the individual time trial of Vuelta a Castilla y León.

Contador competed in the Giro d'Italia, his first time racing in the Giro since his victory in 2008. Contador won the ninth stage on Mount Etna, his first stage win at the Italian Grand Tour. He attacked midway through the climb, dropping his overall rivals and gaining almost a minute on them. That stage gave him the overall lead in the Giro, as well as the points classification lead. Contador extended his overall lead to 3 minutes over second place Vincenzo Nibali where he broke away with José Rujano on the Grossglockner. He solidified his lead through stage 14 up the Monte Zoncolan and a very difficult stage 15 through the Dolomites taking his lead up to 4 minutes ahead of second place Michele Scarponi. He also won the 12.7-kilometre (7.9-mile) mountain time-trial to Nevegal. On 29 May, Contador went on to win the race for the second time finishing 6 minutes ahead of second place Scarponi. In addition to winning the general classification, Contador also won the points classification and finished second in the mountains classification. This made the sixth consecutive grand tour that he entered and won.

Despite the fact that he was scheduled to appear before the Court of Arbitration for Sport (CAS) in early August, Contador announced in early June he would compete in the Tour de France. The CAS had planned to hear the case in early June but the dates were pushed back to early August. Contador aimed to become the first rider to win both the Giro d'Italia and the Tour de France in the same year since Marco Pantani accomplished the feat in 1998.

In the opening stage Contador was slowed by a crash and lost more than one minute. He lost additional time in the team time trial at Les Essarts but finished second in the fourth stage up to Mûr-de-Bretagne. Contador suffered four crashes in the opening nine days of the Tour, injuring his right knee before facing the Pyrenees mountain stages. He was dropped in the final kilometre in the stage to Luz Ardiden and finished two seconds behind Andy Schleck at the top of the Plateau de Beille. On the sixteenth stage to Gap, Contador attacked on the ascent of the Col de Manse, with Cadel Evans and Samuel Sánchez joining him in taking a time advantage over the other favourites in the general classification, including more than a minute over Schleck. He was also aggressive in the next stage to Pinerolo but unable to win time to the other favourites besides Thomas Voeckler and Ivan Basso. In the stage to the Col du Galibier he lost time to the other favourites after Schleck launched a solo attack 60 kilometres (37 miles) from the finish and Contador was later unable to follow the pace set by Evans. Contador launched an early attack on the last mountain stage to Alpe d'Huez, reaching the top of Galibier with Schleck, but their effort proved unsuccessful and they were captured by the rest of the main contenders following the long descent from the mountain. Contador launched another attack on the first kilometres of Alpe d'Huez but he was eventually beaten to victory by Pierre Rolland with Samuel Sánchez second. Contador finished fifth in the overall classification, 3 minutes 57 seconds behind Evans, bringing an end to his streak of winning six consecutive Grand Tours that he entered.

==== 2012 season ====
Contador started his season with still no verdict in the clenbuterol case. He finished second overall in the Tour de San Luis and he won both uphill finishes, only falling short in the time trial stage of the race. On 6 February he was stripped of these early results, as well the 2010 Tour de France and 2011 Giro d'Italia wins and many other victories. He was also suspended until 5 August and his contract with Team Saxo Bank was annulled.

On 8 June it was announced that Contador would rejoin Saxo Bank–Tinkoff Bank upon the completion of his ban, signing a contract that would keep him with the team until the end of the 2015 season. After the completion of his suspension, Contador competed in the Eneco Tour as preparation for the Vuelta a España where he finished 4th in the general classification. Consequently, Contador was named leader of Saxo Bank–Tinkoff Bank for the Vuelta a España. Contador attacked numerous times throughout the mountains in the first sixteen stages of the race, but with no avail, since the race leader Joaquim Rodríguez always countered and finished ahead of him. This proved costly since there were bonus seconds awarded to the first three riders of each stage: twelve seconds for first, eight seconds for second and four seconds for third. Even on the queen stage of the race, finishing atop the Cuitu Negru and featuring slopes with a gradient of more than 20% close to the line, Rodríguez annulled the numerous attacks of Contador and sailed past him to the finish. However, his fortunes turned around during the seventeenth stage; he attacked in that latter portion of the stage and made a solo effort up the final climb of the day after his breakaway companion Paolo Tiralongo of Astana was dropped. Contador won the stage by six seconds over the first chase group and took the lead away from Rodríguez, who was relegated to more than two minutes in the general classification. He held on to the race lead during the last mountain stage leading atop the Bola del Mondo, where he was dropped by Rodríguez and Alejandro Valverde (Movistar Team), who held second place overall. He managed to limit his losses and retain the lead of the race. On the next day, Contador crossed the finish line in Madrid with the race leader's red jersey, earning the second Vuelta victory of his career.

Contador participated in the UCI Road World Championships held in Valkenburg in both the road race and the individual time trial. He was ninth in the time trial, after being overtaken by eventual winner Tony Martin, who started two minutes behind him. For the road race, Contador rode in support of his Spanish teammates and finished 53 seconds in arrears of the victor, Belgian Philippe Gilbert. Days later, Contador headed for Italy to take part in the newly resurrected Classic Milano–Torino. He took the win by accelerating on the final slope of the day in sight of the final kilometre banner, dropping all contenders. It was the first time in his career that he won a single-day race, and he dedicated the event to the memory of Víctor Cabedo, a young professional cyclist who died in a training accident a week prior.

==== 2013 season ====
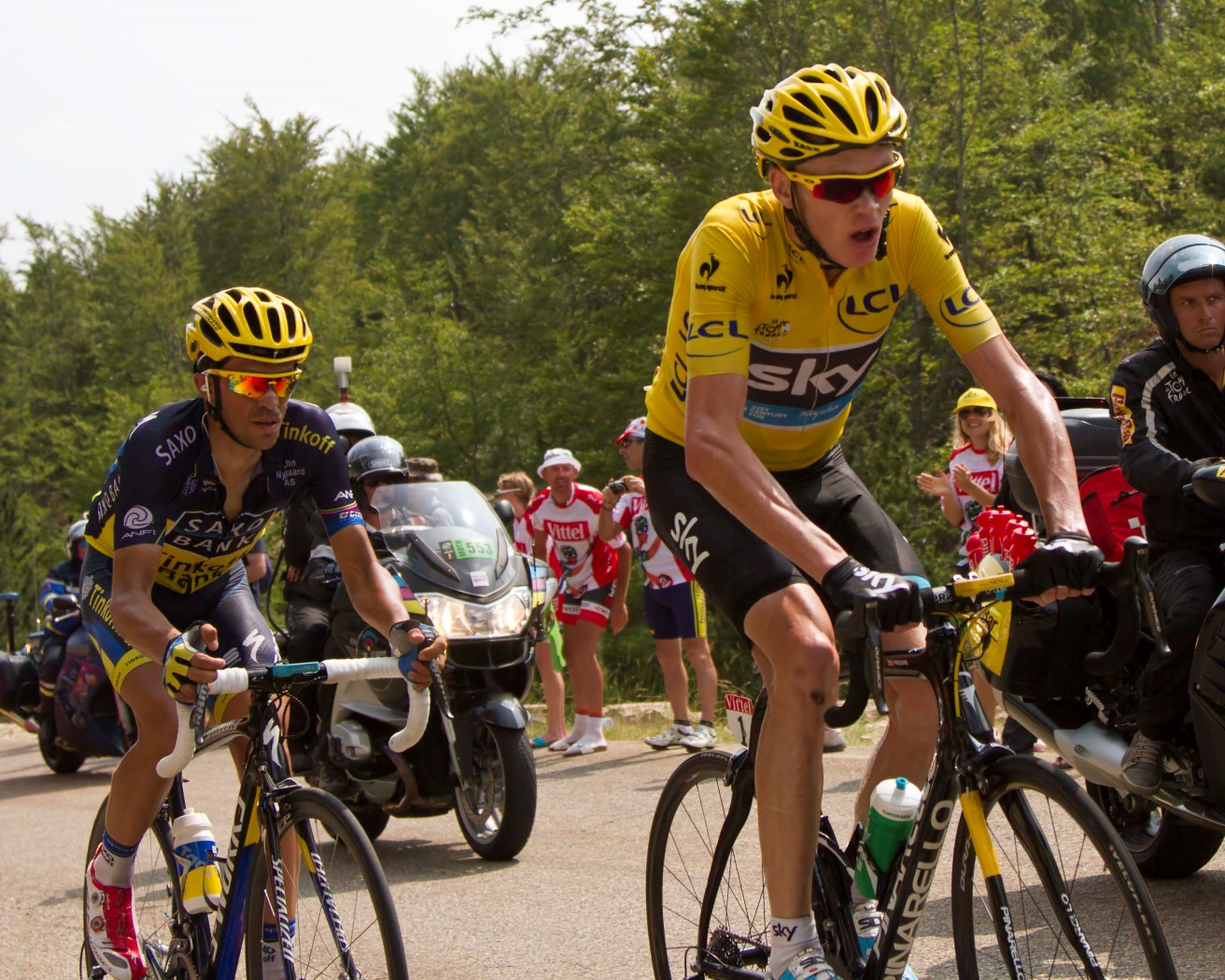
Contador with Chris Froome at the 2013 Tour de France

In 2013, Contador's only victory was a stage in the Tour de San Luis in January. From then on, his season did not go as expected: though finishing 3rd in Tirreno–Adriatico he became ill during the race. This disrupted his preparations for the rest of the season. Contador returned to racing in the Tour of the Basque Country in April and finished fifth in the general classification. He was too late to be in optimal condition for the Tour de France, where he could not match up to Chris Froome and finished in fourth place. After the Tour, main sponsor Oleg Tinkov expressed critical comments on Contador's style of riding. At the end of the season, Tinkov bought the team ownership, but Contador stayed loyal to the team.

==== 2014 season ====
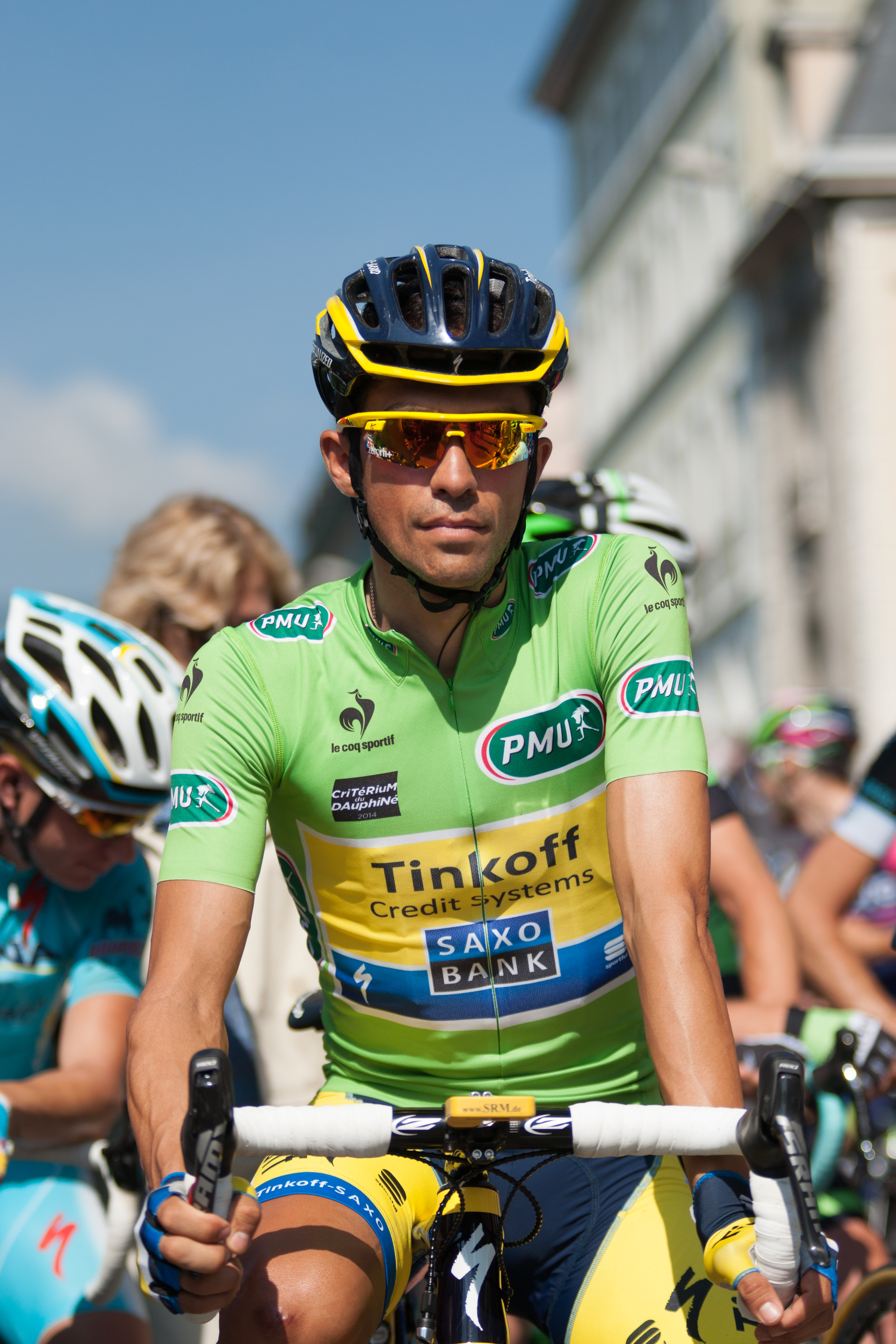
Contador at the 2014 Critérium du Dauphiné

After a disappointing 2013 season, Contador went into the season trying to find the form that allowed him to take numerous victories in the past. Contador's first objective of the season was the Volta ao Algarve. Although he would lose time to Michał Kwiatkowski after his two consecutive stage wins, Contador showed his much improving form in the race, taking third in the second stage and fourth in the third stage individual time trial before taking his first win of the season on the fourth stage. In the stage featuring a summit finish at Alto do Malhão, Contador attacked a kilometre from the finish as he eventually soloed to the stage win, three seconds ahead of Rui Costa. He eventually finished second overall, 19 seconds down on Kwiatkowski.

Contador's next race was Tirreno–Adriatico where he faced stiffer competition with riders such as Nairo Quintana and Jean-Christophe Péraud. He continued to show his strong form by winning the third stage of the race going to Cittareale after he outsprinted Quintana, his main rival for the race. He took the lead in the general classification on the next day, winning a second successive stage as he attacked on the stage's penultimate climb before soloing to the finish. He kept his lead for the remainder of the race, finishing more than two minutes clear ahead of runner-up Quintana. Contador raced the Volta a Catalunya next, where he had his first duel with riders such as Chris Froome and Joaquim Rodríguez. On the race's first mountain stage, he followed attacks set by his fellow general classification contenders before he had to settle for second in the stage, 5 seconds behind Rodríguez. He finished the race in second place overall, just 4 seconds behind Rodríguez.

Contador's next objective for the season was the Tour of the Basque Country. He got into a duel with fellow Spaniard Alejandro Valverde and both riders did not disappoint on the first stage. Contador followed Valverde's attack on the stage's last climb before putting on an attack that Valverde was not able to answer. He negotiated the descent and soloed to the stage win and yellow jersey, 14 seconds ahead of Valverde. He kept the race lead to the end, finishing second on the final stage time trial and winning the race by 49 seconds ahead of Michał Kwiatkowski. As his final preparation for the Tour de France, Contador entered the Critérium du Dauphiné where he battled with Froome and Vincenzo Nibali, his main rivals for the Tour. Contador started the Dauphiné on good form, finishing second to Froome on the race's short individual time trial before dueling with Froome on the Col du Béal. Unlike in 2013 where he was unable to follow the accelerations of Froome, Contador was able to stay on his rival's wheel, eventually finishing second on the stage after Froome outsprinted him to the line. He had his next duel with Froome on the seventh stage, the queen stage of the race. Contador attacked with 2 kilometres (1.2 miles) left on the stage and Froome (who was suffering from the effects of a crash on the previous day's stage) was not able to bridge the gap to him as Contador took the yellow jersey as leader of the general classification. However, Contador fell victim to an ambush on the next stage as several riders in the top ten went into the breakaway including Andrew Talansky, who was sitting in third place overall, 39 seconds behind Contador. Contador was left isolated with no teammates around him as he tried to bridge the gap to the leading group but he ran out of steam as Talansky won the race overall. However, Contador dealt a psychological blow to Froome ahead of the Tour as Froome struggled in the stage, eventually dropping to 12th place overall.

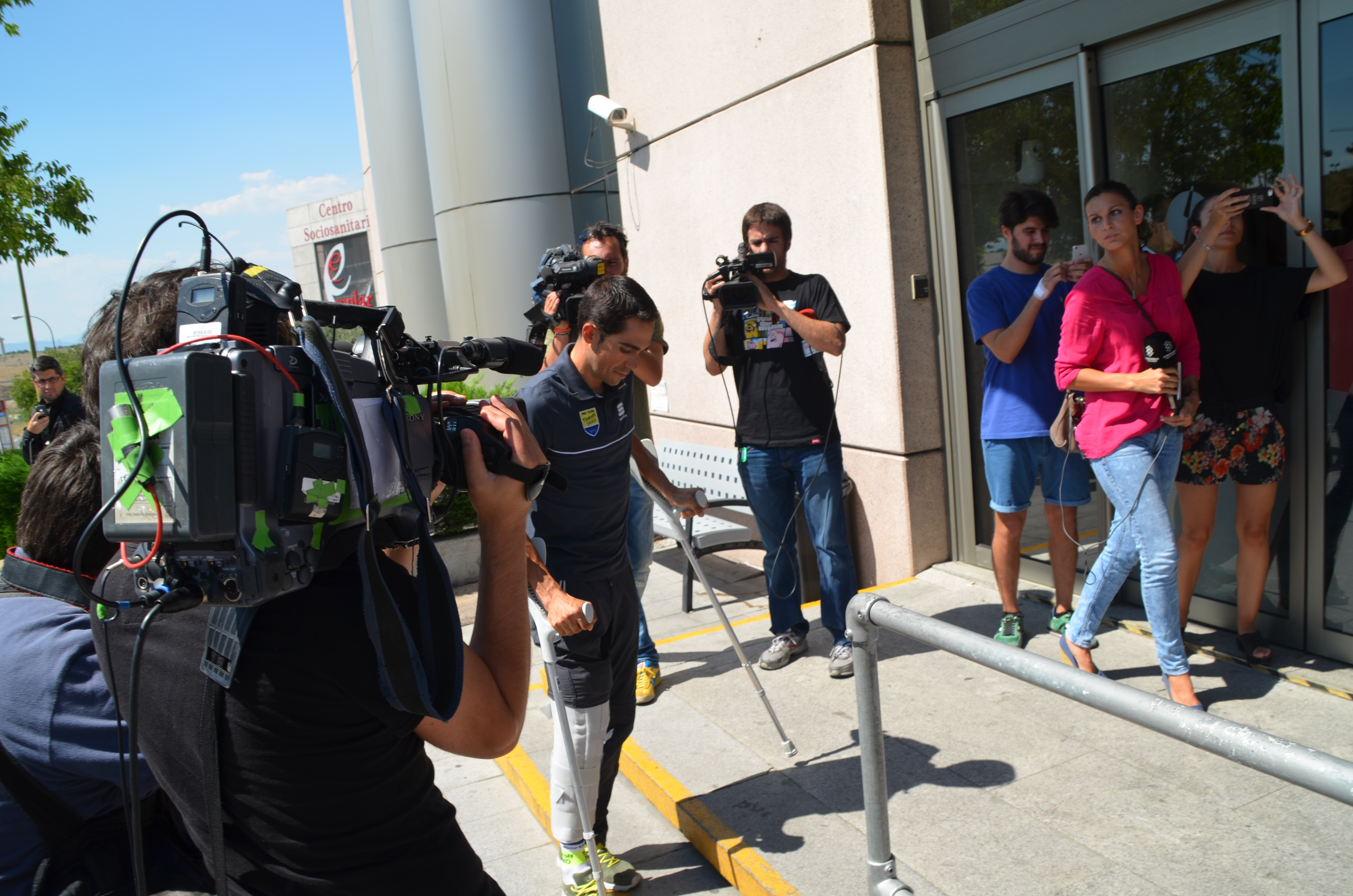
Contador after his 2014 Tour de France crash, going to a medical facility with crutches

In the Tour de France, Contador entered the race in much better form. He avoided crashing during the first week but he lost a lot of time in the fifth stage of the race, the stage featuring cobbles as part of the route. He lost around 2 1/2 minutes to fellow overall contender, Nibali, as he was unable to bridge the gap to him after mud became stuck in his gears. On the Tour's first summit finish going to Gérardmer, he attacked as Nibali went with him. Contador made a final acceleration near the finish line as he took 3 seconds back on Nibali. On the descent of the Petit Ballon in the tenth stage, Contador crashed heavily before he was treated on the side of the road. He tried to ride for nearly 20 kilometres (12 miles) after the crash but he eventually abandoned the Tour. He initially ruled himself out of the Vuelta a España as well but he eventually joined the start list of the race.

His Vuelta started well as his team, Tinkoff–Saxo, finished seventh in the opening team time trial, 19 seconds behind the Movistar Team, the team which fielded fellow overall contenders, Quintana and Valverde. On the race's first mountain stage to La Zubia, he was able to stay with the overall contenders as he eventually finished the stage in third place behind Froome and Valverde. He showed his improving form on the next mountain stage to Valdelinares, attacking with around 2 kilometres (1.2 miles) to go while dropping Froome and Valverde among others as he sat 3 seconds behind red jersey holder Quintana before the individual time trial. He took the red jersey on the individual time trial as he finished fourth. He showed he could defend the red jersey by staying with his fellow overall contenders. On the race's queen stage to La Farrapona, he followed Froome's attack with 4 kilometres (2.5 miles) to go while distancing other overall contenders. He stayed in his rival's wheel before putting on a finishing kick with around 800 metres (2,600 feet) to go, winning the stage and strengthening his hold on the red jersey. The same thing happened on the penultimate stage to Puerto de Ancares where he followed Froome throughout the climb, distancing the other contenders once again before kicking on to take the stage, all but securing the red jersey. On the final stage individual time trial, he rode conservatively in wet conditions to avoid any mishaps and though he lost time to the other favourites, he had more than enough time in hand to win his third Vuelta.

During the Vuelta, Contador announced he would not contest the UCI Road World Championships in Ponferrada, saying the course did not fit his characteristics at all. Contador suffered a crash in the Giro di Lombardia, injuring the knee that he had hurt in the Tour de France and ending his chances of winning the 2014 UCI World Tour overall classification, as he decided to forego the Tour of Beijing to better prepare for the 2015 season.

==== 2015 season ====
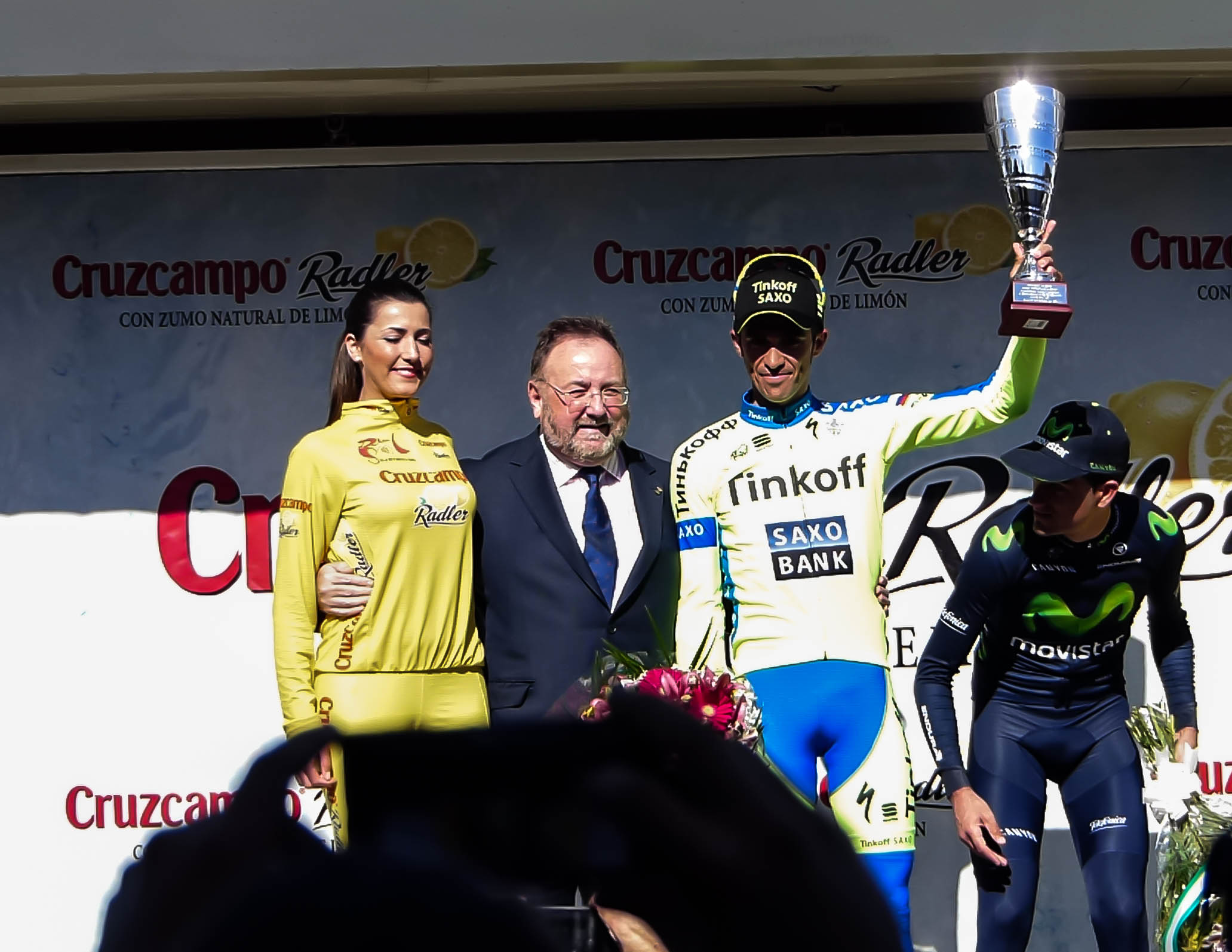
Alberto Contador at the 2015 Vuelta a Andalucía

For 2015, Contador announced that he would attempt to win both the Giro d'Italia and the Tour de France, a feat that had not been done since Marco Pantani accomplished it in 1998. His debut race was the Vuelta an Andalucía in February. He took the race lead after the time trial on stage 1b, finishing fourth. Contador then won stage 3, a mountaintop finish, by attacking with 7.5 kilometres (4.7 miles) to go. He did however lose the race leader's jersey on the very next stage, another mountain affair, where Chris Froome snatched both the stage win and the race lead. Froome did not relinquish his lead and Contador finished the race second in the overall classification, only 2 seconds behind. In mid-March, Contador finished fifth overall at Tirreno–Adriatico, helping his teammate Peter Sagan win stage 6 by accelerating on a climb and shedding the pure sprinters off the leading group. At the end of March, Contador took fourth place in the Volta a Catalunya, where he crashed severely in the penultimate stage. Contador was able to remount and participate in the last stage, securing his general classification placing. At the end of April, and days before the start of the Giro d'Italia, Contador revealed that he was ready for the Grand Tour race. His injuries sustained in the Volta a Catalunya were healed and included a micro-fissure in his sacrum. He stated: "I'm going very well, the big blocks of training here in the Canaries are all but finished and I'm now beginning to go through the recovery phase prior to the Giro. I've done a huge amount of climbing rides in these last three weeks and now what we've got to do is ease back before next week."

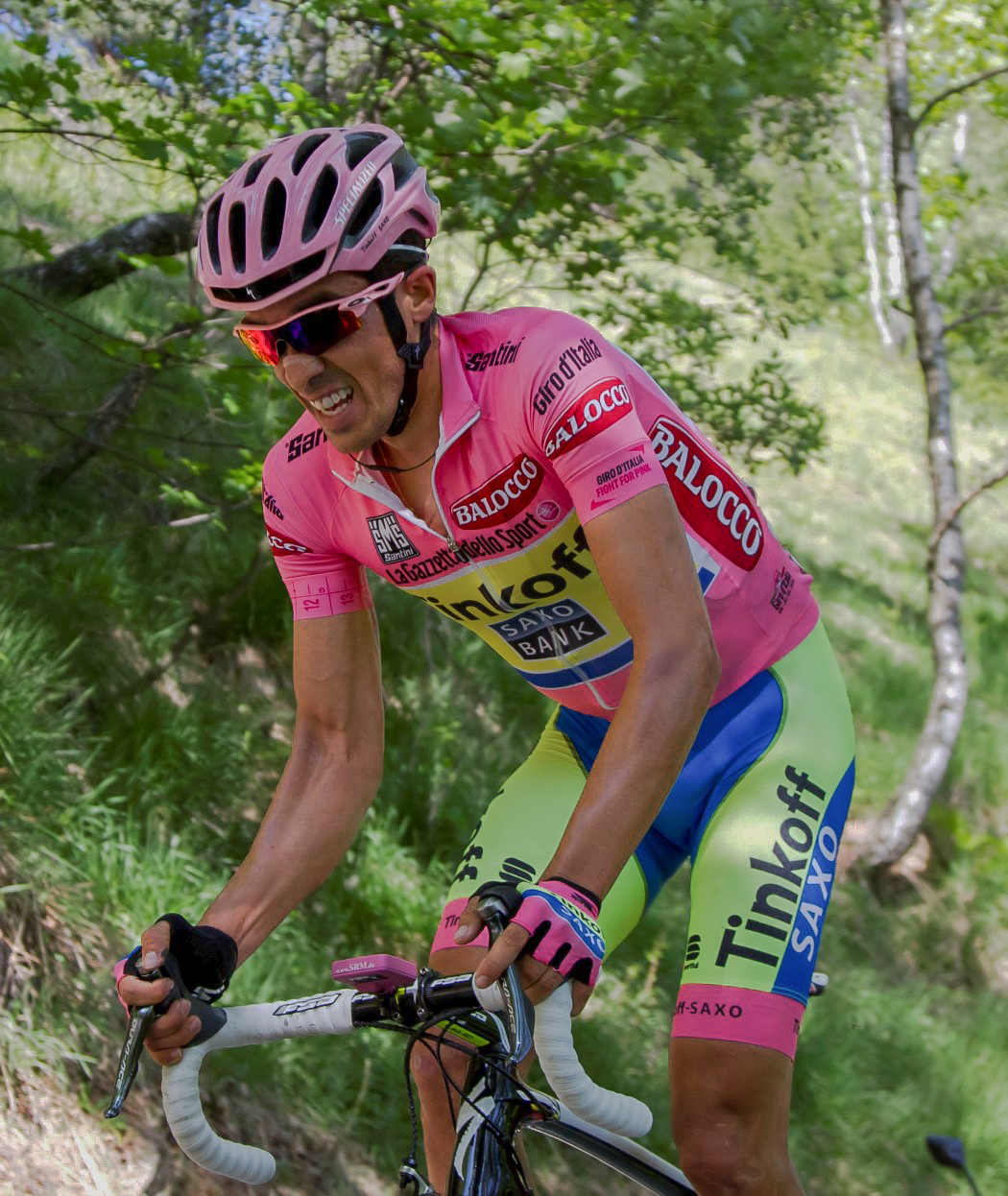
Contador wearing the maglia rosa at the 2015 Giro d'Italia

At the Giro d'Italia, Contador's Tinkoff–Saxo team performed well in the opening team time trial, finishing 2nd to Orica–GreenEDGE. He gained 6 seconds on Fabio Aru, 12 seconds on Rigoberto Urán, and 20 seconds on Richie Porte. Contador took the maglia rosa on the summit finish on stage 5 to Abetone. However, the next day, Contador dislocated his shoulder after crashing on the finishing straight. He was able to finish but dislocated the shoulder again before the podium presentation. Despite this, Contador was able to continue in the race, holding on to the jersey. However, on stage 13, on what most assumed was an "easy day" of racing, Contador crashed in a pile-up, 3.2 kilometres (2.0 miles) from the finish; he crossed the line 42 seconds behind the peloton, including Aru. Thus Contador lost the pink jersey, the first time he lost the leader's jersey in any Grand Tour up to that point in his career. However the next day, on a 59.3-kilometre (36.8-mile) individual time trial, Contador led the field, taking back the pink jersey and created a sizable time difference over the rest of the peloton. On stage 16, Contador suffered a mechanical problem on the descent of Apria and other teams including Astana tried to take advantage. Still, Contador made contact with Aru at the Mortirolo Pass and put another two minutes into his rival as Mikel Landa became the second-placed rider on the general classification. On Stage 20, Contador lost some time to both Landa and Aru but retained his pink jersey. Eventually, he won the overall classification by 1:53 over Aru. Despite being stripped of his 2011 title for a doping suspension, Contador insisted that this was his third Giro victory, therefore including the 2011 race in his count. With his second official Giro title, along with two official Tour de France titles and three Vuelta a España overall wins, Contador joined Bernard Hinault as the only cyclists to have achieved multiple victories at each of the Grand Tours.

In preparation for the Tour, Contador chose to ride the four-day Route du Sud, where he won the queen stage and the overall classification. His main rival was Nairo Quintana, a competitor he had to contend with at the Tour de France. Contador had solid opening to the first week of the tour; despite losing a little time to Chris Froome in the team time trial, he gained time on his rivals including Nibali and Quintana who both lost time on stage 2. He struggled though on the opening summit finish losing 3 minutes to stage winner Froome putting a serious dent to his victory chances. Despite this setback he improved on the next two Pyrenean stages staying in contact with his big rivals where he also remained 6th overall. His chances faded after he crashed on the descent of the Colle d'Allos on stage 17. Despite a hard effort on the finishing climb after, he lost over 2 minutes to Froome and Quintana. He was unable to recover from his crash on stage 17 and his efforts in the Giro which made him unable to match his rivals on the last 2 mountain stages. Contador finished the Tour de France in fifth place, 9' 48" down on winner Froome. Though he failed to achieve the double in the end, Contador had no regrets over his attempt. "It's true that there are riders that would dream of finishing fifth. For me that was not my objective but I'm glad that I tried. If I hadn't tried then after my career I might have wondered whether I could have done the Giro-Tour double and now I know. I don't think it's impossible to do the double but it's really complicated because nobody has the experience on how to prepare it. However, I prefer having tried than being left with a desire to do it".

After the Tour, Contador planned on racing the Clásica de San Sebastián but had to cancel due to sickness, ending his 2015 season.

==== 2016 season ====
In March 2015, Contador signed a contract extension with his team, Tinkoff, but at the same time announced that 2016 would be his final season in professional cycling. He competed in his first race of the season at the Volta ao Algarve, finishing third overall and winning the final stage of the race. He went on to claim runner-up finishes in Paris–Nice, where he attacked race leader Geraint Thomas from 50 kilometres (31 miles) out and again on the final climb of Col d'Èze before Thomas closed the gap on the final descent to the finish line, and the Volta a Catalunya, before taking the general classification and the stage six time trial at the Tour of the Basque Country, subsequently stating to the press that he would postpone his retirement for at least another year.

Contador got off to a difficult start to the Tour de France, crashing in the opening stages and losing time to his rivals. He was in 20th place on the general classification with a deficit of 3 minutes 12 seconds to leader Chris Froome before the ninth stage, where after attempting to make the breakaway at the start of the day, he withdrew from the race, citing a fever which had developed overnight. In August, Contador won the overall classification of the Vuelta a Burgos, beating both Ben Hermans and Sergio Pardilla by just one second. He went on to finish fourth at the Vuelta a España.

=== Trek–Segafredo (2017) ===
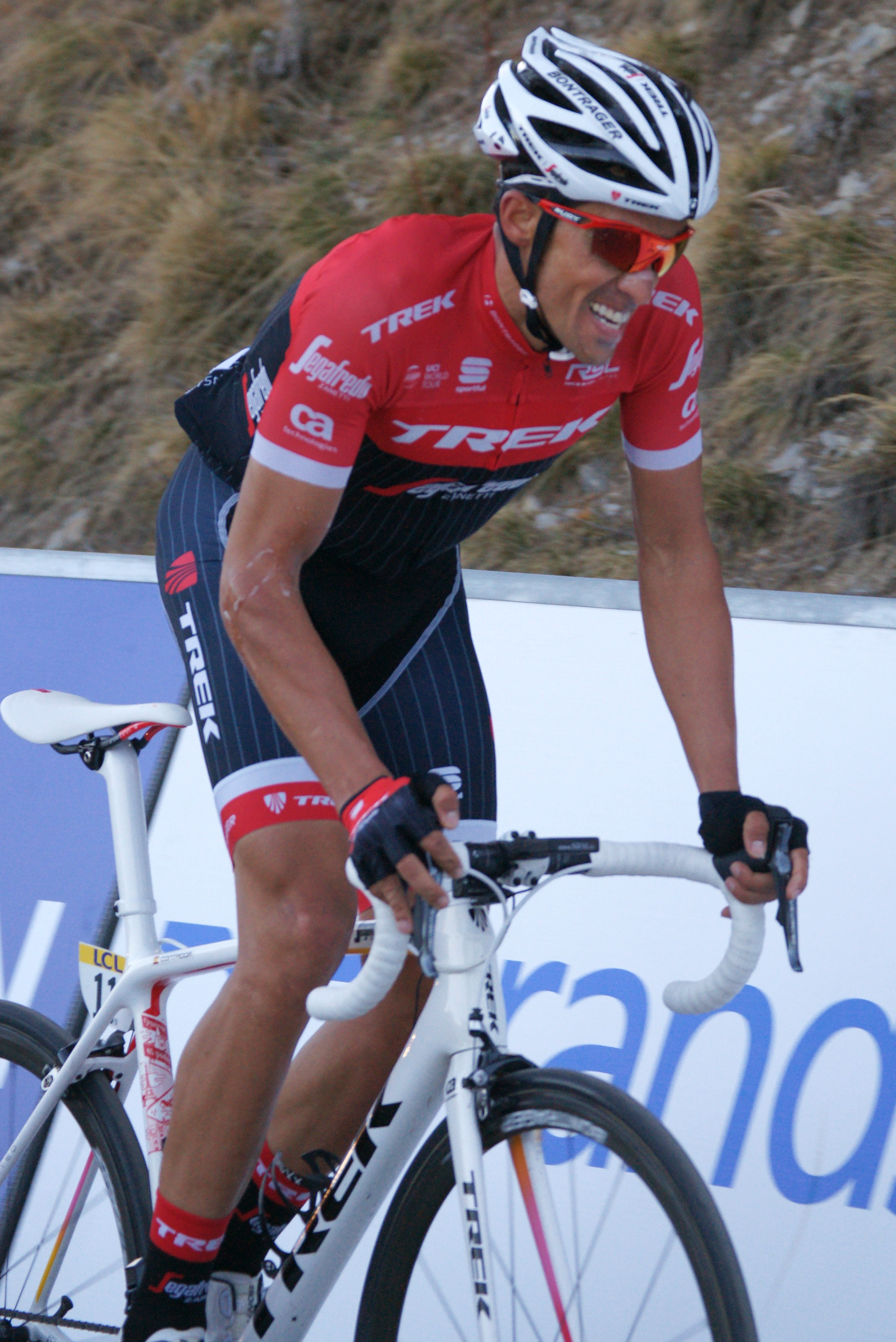
Contador during the 2017 Paris–Nice

During the 2016 Tour de France it was reported that Contador would race for Trek–Segafredo for the 2017 season, with the deal being confirmed by the team in September, along with the transfer of teammate Jesús Hernández and Tinkoff directeur sportif Steven de Jongh. This would be his final season as a professional cyclist.

In February, Contador began his season by finishing Vuelta an Andalucía, one second behind Movistar Team's Alejandro Valverde. In March, Contador missed out on victory in Paris–Nice to a Team Sky rider by a narrow margin for the second year running after Sergio Henao managed to fend off a final-day attack to win the race by just two seconds. Contador had trailed by 31 seconds overnight, but had gone clear with Quick-Step Floors rider David de la Cruz and Marc Soler of the Movistar Team; after taking a couple of seconds at an intermediate sprint, Contador was beaten to the line in Nice by de la Cruz, which cost him four bonus seconds and decided the race in favour of Henao. Later that month, Contador finished second overall at the Volta a Catalunya, 63 seconds behind Valverde. In April, Contador finished second overall at the Tour of the Basque Country, again behind Valverde.

In July, Contador rode the Tour de France for the final time, but was unable to challenge for overall victory, finishing ninth overall, 8 minutes and 49 seconds down on the winner, Chris Froome. In August, Contador rode the Vuelta a España, which was to be his final race as a professional. Contador rode an aggressive race in search of a stage victory, placing fifth overall, winning the combativity award in his final Grand Tour, as well as winning the final mountain stage atop the iconic Alto de l'Angliru after attacking on the penultimate climb of the day.

Alberto Contador raced his final professional road race, the Japan Cup criterium, on 21 October 2017.

== Doping ==
=== Operation Puerto ===
After final rosters had been presented for the 2006 Tour de France, Contador and five other members of the Astana–Würth team were barred from competing due to alleged connections with the Operación Puerto doping case. Contador and four other members of his team at the time, Astana–Würth, were eventually cleared of all charges on 26 July 2006 by the Spanish courts and later two out of the five (including Contador) were cleared by the UCI. Each received a written document signed by Manuel Sánchez Martín, secretary for the Spanish court, stating that "there are not any type of charges against them nor have there been adopted any type of legal action against them."

In May 2006, a document from the summary of the investigation (Documento 31) was released. In it, the initials "A.C." were associated with a hand-written note saying, "Spanish: Nada o igual a J.J." (Nothing or the same as J.J.). J.J. were the initials of Jörg Jaksche, who later admitted to being guilty of blood doping prepared by the Spanish doctor Eufemiano Fuentes in 2005. Contador was questioned in December 2006 by the magistrate in charge of the Puerto file. The rider declared to Judge Antonio Serrano that he did not know Fuentes personally. According to French daily Le Monde, he refused then to undergo a DNA test that would have judged whether or not he had any link to the blood bags that were found in the investigation.

On 28 July 2007, Le Monde, citing what it claimed was an investigation file to which it had access, stated that Contador's name appeared in several documents found during Operación Puerto. A second reference includes initials of riders' names that appeared on another training document, although neither of those two references could be linked to doping practices.

On 30 July 2007, German doping expert Werner Franke accused Contador of having taken drugs in the past and being prescribed a doping regimen by Fuentes, who was connected with Operación Puerto. He passed his allegations on to the German authorities the following day. Contador denied the accusations, saying "I was in the wrong team at the wrong time and somehow my name got among the documents." On 10 August, Contador publicly declared himself to be a clean rider in face of suspicions about his alleged links to the Operación Puerto blood doping ring.

=== 2010 Tour de France ===
In September 2010, Contador revealed that a urine sample he had given on 21 July, a rest day in the Tour de France, had contained traces of clenbuterol. He has stated, due to the number of other tests he passed and that only a tiny amount of the substance was detected in the one he failed, that food contamination was to blame. Adding credibility to the explanation, anti-doping doctor Don Catlin said that of the contaminants found in food supplements, clenbuterol is one of the more common. However, when asked if it was plausible that Contador had ingested the clenbuterol through contamination, Catlin said "without knowing what the level in his sample is, it's impossible to say." Contador stated that he is the victim, and he can "hold his head high" and that he thinks he should not be punished. Several people related to the sport defended Contador saying that there is little benefit from using the drug in the amounts that were discovered and that no one would intentionally take such an easily detectable substance.

There was some scepticism of Contador's claim that contaminated meat was to blame. In 2008 and 2009, only one animal sample came back positive for clenbuterol out of 83,203 animal samples tested by EU member nations. Out of 19,431 animal tests in Spain over the same period, there were no samples that came back positive for clenbuterol. Contador's urine sample, taken during the day before his clenbuterol positive sample, was reported to contain plastic residue (plasticizers) indicating possible blood doping as these materials are introduced to the bloodstream from blood bags used in blood doping, but the test was not recognised by the World Anti-Doping Agency, so no charges in relation to this finding were brought. A theory circulated that blood doping could account for the minute traces if the clenbuterol was introduced through a transfusion, re-introducing contaminated blood that had been extracted at a time when he had been taking Clenbuterol. It was supposed that this caused the presence of it in his system and the subsequent failed test, rather than the direct ingestion or injection of the drug at the time. This theory also recognised that Clenbuterol is not very effective at all as a performance-enhancing drug, but effective if used to strip fat and hence reduce a rider's weight pre-season, and it is theorized that this is when the blood was taken which was later re-introduced by transfusion.

The UCI issued a statement reporting that the concentration was 50 pg/mL, and that this was 400 times below the minimum standards of detection capability required by WADA, and that further scientific investigation was required. Contador was provisionally suspended from competition, although this had no short-term effect as he had already finished his racing programme for the 2010 season. Contador had been informed of the results over a month earlier, on 24 August. Later the amount discovered was clarified as 40 times below the minimum standards, rather than the 400 times originally reported by the UCI. Contador's scientific adviser claimed that he would have needed 180 times the amount detected to gain any benefit in his performance.

In late January 2011, the Royal Spanish Cycling Federation (RFEC) proposed a one-year ban, but it subsequently accepted Contador's appeal and cleared him of all charges. Contador returned to racing in February in the Volta ao Algarve, a race he won in 2009 and 2010. The UCI and the World Anti-Doping Agency each appealed the RFEC decision independently to the Court of Arbitration for Sport in March 2011, but Contador remained free to ride until the CAS made its ruling. The hearing with CAS was initially scheduled for June, but following an extension requested by Contador's legal team, it was rearranged for August, in the week following the Tour de France, and later postponed again until November, with the result to be given in 2012. The decision on 6 February 2012 found Contador guilty of accidental ingestion of the prohibited substance Clenbuterol and hence he was stripped of his 2010 Tour de France title, and his results since that race, including victory in the 2011 Giro d'Italia and fifth place in the 2011 Tour de France, were voided, and he was suspended until August 2012. The following day, in a press conference, his contract with Team Saxo Bank was annulled.

== Post racing ==
Following his exit from racing, Contador and Ivan Basso opened up Aurum bikes in 2020.

In 2018 Contador joined television channel Eurosport as a cycling commentator.

== Career achievements ==
=== Major results ===
2001
3rd Time trial, National Under-23 Road Championships
2002
1st Time trial, National Under-23 Road Championships
9th Overall Ruban Granitier Breton
2003 (1 pro win)
1st Stage 8 (ITT) Tour de Pologne
9th Clásica a los Puertos de Guadarrama
2004
1st Mountains classification, Vuelta a Aragón
5th Overall Setmana Catalana de Ciclisme
2005 (5)
1st Overall Setmana Catalana de Ciclisme

1st Combination classification
1st Stage 3

1st Stage 5 Tour Down Under
3rd Overall Tour of the Basque Country

1st Points classification
1st Stage 5b (ITT)

4th Overall Tour de Romandie

1st Stage 4

7th Klasika Primavera
2006 (2)
1st Stage 8 Tour de Suisse
2nd Overall Tour de Romandie

1st Stage 3

4th Klasika Primavera
5th Overall Tour of the Basque Country
9th GP Miguel Induráin
2007 (8)
1st Overall Tour de France

1st Young rider classification
1st Stage 14

1st Overall Paris–Nice

1st Young rider classification
1st Stages 4 & 7

1st Overall Vuelta a Castilla y León

1st Combination classification
1st Spanish rider classification
1st Stage 4

1st Stage 4 Volta a la Comunitat Valenciana
3rd Trofeo Sóller
6th Overall Critérium du Dauphiné Libéré
2008 (10)
1st Overall Giro d'Italia
1st Overall Vuelta a España

1st Combination classification
1st Stages 13 & 14

1st Overall Tour of the Basque Country

1st Stages 1 & 6 (ITT)

1st Overall Vuelta a Castilla y León

1st Combination classification
1st Spanish rider classification
1st Stages 1 (ITT) & 4

2nd Clásica a los Puertos de Guadarrama
3rd Overall Vuelta a Murcia
4th Time trial, Olympic Games
6th Overall Volta a la Comunitat Valenciana
2009 (11)
1st UCI World Ranking
1st Time trial, National Road Championships
1st Overall Tour de France

1st Stages 4 (TTT), 15 & 18 (ITT)

1st Overall Tour of the Basque Country

1st Stages 3 & 6 (ITT)

1st Overall Volta ao Algarve

1st Stage 4 (ITT)

1st RaboRonde Heerlen
2nd Overall Vuelta a Castilla y León
3rd Overall Critérium du Dauphiné Libéré
4th Overall Paris–Nice

1st Stages 1 (ITT) & 6

2010 (8)
1st Overall Paris–Nice

1st Stage 4

1st Overall Volta ao Algarve

1st Stage 3

1st Overall Vuelta a Castilla y León

1st Combination classification
1st Spanish rider classification
1st Stage 4 (ITT)

2nd Overall Critérium du Dauphiné

1st Points classification
1st Prologue & Stage 6

3rd La Flèche Wallonne
9th Liège–Bastogne–Liège

Voided results from July 2010 to February 2012.

~~1st Overall Tour de France~~
2011
~~1st Overall Giro d'Italia~~

~~1st Points classification~~
~~1st Stages 9 & 16 (ITT)~~

~~1st Overall Volta a Catalunya~~

~~1st Stage 3~~

~~1st Overall Vuelta a Murcia~~

~~1st Points classification~~
~~1st Stages 2 & 3 (ITT)~~

~~1st Stage 4 (ITT) Vuelta a Castilla y León~~
~~National Road Championships~~

~~2nd Road race~~
~~3rd Time trial~~

~~4th Overall Volta ao Algarve~~
~~5th Overall Tour de France~~
2012
~~2nd Overall Tour de San Luis~~

~~1st Stages 3 & 5~~

2012 (3)
1st Overall Vuelta a España

1st Stage 17
Combativity award Overall

1st Milano–Torino
4th Overall Eneco Tour
9th Time trial, UCI Road World Championships
9th Giro di Lombardia
2013 (1)
2nd Overall Tour of Oman
3rd Overall Tirreno–Adriatico

1st Points classification

3rd Klasika Primavera
4th Overall Tour de France
4th Overall Tour de San Luis

1st Stage 6

5th Overall Tour of the Basque Country
5th Milano–Torino
10th Overall Critérium du Dauphiné
2014 (9)
1st Overall Vuelta a España

1st Combination classification
1st Stages 16 & 20

1st Overall Tirreno–Adriatico

1st Stages 4 & 5

1st Overall Tour of the Basque Country

1st Stage 1

2nd UCI World Tour
2nd Overall Volta ao Algarve

1st Stage 4

2nd Overall Volta a Catalunya
2nd Overall Critérium du Dauphiné
6th Milano–Torino
2015 (4)
1st Overall Giro d'Italia
1st Overall Route du Sud

1st Stage 3

2nd Overall Vuelta a Andalucía

1st Spanish rider classification
1st Stage 3

4th Overall Volta a Catalunya
5th Overall Tirreno–Adriatico
5th Overall Tour de France
7th UCI World Tour
2016 (5)
1st Overall Tour of the Basque Country

1st Stage 6 (ITT)

1st Overall Vuelta a Burgos
2nd Overall Paris–Nice
2nd Overall Volta a Catalunya
3rd Overall Volta ao Algarve

1st Stage 5

4th Overall Vuelta a España

Combativity award Stage 15 & Overall

5th UCI World Tour
5th Overall Critérium du Dauphiné

1st Prologue

5th Overall Abu Dhabi Tour
2017 (1)
2nd Overall Paris–Nice
2nd Overall Vuelta a Andalucía
2nd Overall Volta a Catalunya
2nd Overall Tour of the Basque Country
5th Overall Vuelta a España

1st Stage 17
1st Stage 20
Combativity award Overall

9th Overall Tour de France

Combativity award Stages 13 & 17

10th UCI World Tour

==== General classification results timeline ====
Major stage race general classification results
Grand Tour	2004	2005	2006	2007	2008	2009	2010	2011	2012	2013	2014	2015	2016	2017
Giro d'Italia	—	—	—	—	1	—	—	~~1~~	—	—	—	1	—	—
Tour de France	—	31	—	1	—	1	~~1~~	~~5~~	—	4	DNF	5	DNF	9
/ Vuelta a España	—	—	—	—	1	—	—	—	1	—	1	—	4	5
Major stage race general classification results
Major stage race	2004	2005	2006	2007	2008	2009	2010	2011	2012	2013	2014	2015	2016	2017
Paris–Nice	26	15	24	1	—	4	1	—	—	—	—	—	2	2
/ Tirreno–Adriatico	—	—	—	—	—	—	—	—	—	3	1	5	—	—
Volta a Catalunya	—	—	—	—	—	—	—	~~1~~	—	—	2	4	2	2
Tour of the Basque Country	—	3	5	14	1	1	—	—	—	5	1	—	1	2
Tour de Romandie	—	4	2	—	—	—	—	—	—	—	—	—	—	—
Critérium du Dauphiné	—	DNF	—	6	—	3	2	—	—	10	2	—	5	11
Tour de Suisse	—	—	22	—	—	—	—	—	—	—	—	—	—	—

==== Monuments results timeline ====
Monument	2003	2004	2005	2006	2007	2008	2009	2010	2011	2012	2013	2014
Milan–San Remo	Did not contest during his career											
Tour of Flanders	Did not contest during his career											
Paris–Roubaix	Did not contest during his career											
Liège–Bastogne–Liège	—	—	—	80	27	—	—	9	—	—	57	—
Giro di Lombardia	DNF	—	—	—	—	—	—	—	—	9	DNF	34

Legend
—	Did not compete
DNF	Did not finish
~~No.~~	Voided result

=== Awards ===
- Vélo d'Or: 2007, 2008, 2009, 2014

Sporting positions
Preceded by Luis León Sánchez	Spanish National Time Trial Championships; Winner; 2009	Succeeded by Luis León Sánchez
