= Sacred Heart Church, Zhongding =

Sacred Heart Church
- Sacred Heart of Jesus Church, Bingzhongluo
- Zhongding Catholic Church
- 重丁聖心堂
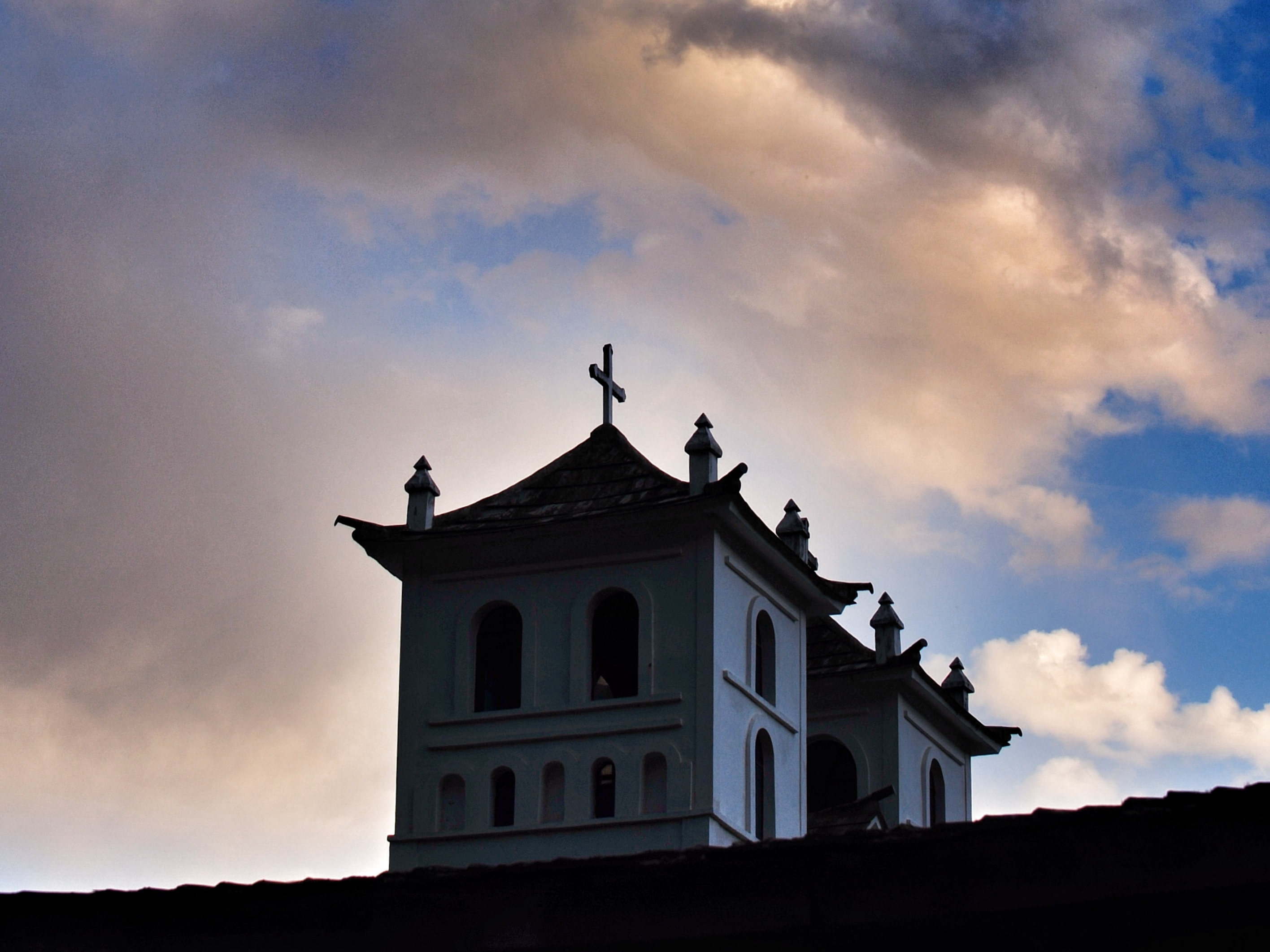
- The towers of the church in 2011

- 28.0270°N 98.6252°E
- Location: Bingzhongluo, Gongshan, Yunnan
- Country: China
- Denomination: Catholic

History
- Status: Church
- Founded: 1908
- Founder: Annet Genestier
- Dedication: Most Sacred Heart of Jesus

Architecture
- Functional status: Active
- Style: Romanesque Revival

Administration
- Diocese: Dali (according to Chinese Patriotic Church); Kangding (historically and according to the Vatican)

Sacred Heart Church, Zhongding
- Traditional Chinese: 重丁聖心堂
- Simplified Chinese: 重丁圣心堂
- Literal meaning: Zhongding Sacred Heart Church
Transcriptions
Standard Mandarin
- Hanyu Pinyin: Zhòng dīng shèng xīn táng

Sacred Heart Church (Note: simplified Chinese: 圣心堂; traditional Chinese: 聖心堂.) or Sacred Heart of Jesus Church, (Note: simplified Chinese: 耶稣圣心堂; traditional Chinese: 耶穌聖心堂.) commonly known as Zhongding Catholic Church, (Note: 重丁天主教堂; Zhongding, formerly romanized as Tchongteu or Tchrongteu.) is a Catholic church in Bingzhongluo, Gongshan, Yunnan, China. It was founded by Annet Genestier in 1908, destroyed during the Cultural Revolution, and rebuilt in 1996. It has been subjected to the government-controlled Catholic Patriotic Association since 1957.

== History ==
=== Original church complex ===
The French missionary Annet Genestier founded the church in 1908, when the Catholic church turned its missionary focus from Tibetans to the Nu people and Lisu people, but this district was still part of the "Mission of Tibet" and later of the Diocese of Kangding. The funds of the construction came from the compensations of a riot in 1905 (see 1905 Batang uprising), in which locals burnt down the Church of the Sacred Heart of Jesus at Bahang, another church Genestier founded. Before the construction, Genestier himself went to Hong Kong, took photographs of churches, and used them for design. He also hired masons, carpenters and painters from Jianchuan. The construction process of the church complex took 10 years.

The original church building was completed in 1918. It was dedicated to the Most Sacred Heart of Jesus. At the time, church complex consisted of the church building and a Siheyuan courtyard with living spaces at the front. The church building originally was made of masonry. According to Tao Yunkui in 1935, the church towers were 24 metres (79 ft) tall, and the church could contain 500 people.

On the outside, the church had a neo-Romanesque facade. The relief sculptures on the facade were carved on white marble (汉白玉), featuring patterns such as iridescent clouds and lotus flowers. The church structure had windows with semicircular arches. On the inside, the church's structure was in Basilica form. There were colonnades of square columns decorated with Corinthian capitals, and some of the pedestals of the columns are in the form of Xumizuo (须弥座). There was also a choir loft above the entrance.

Behind the church, there were a church school and a convent. Both were destroyed during the Cultural Revolution, and their grounds were not returned in 1980.

Chen Haozhou considers the church to be the most valuable Western church in the area before its destruction. According to him, the choice of western architecture for the church reflects Genestier's indignation against the 1905 riot and his devotion to Catholicism. The western architectural style, Chen believed, could be the reason why the original church building was eventually demolished.

During the Cultural Revolution, the original church building was destroyed. The masonry of the church was reused to build the county government, the Shimenguan Hydropower Plant (石门关水电站), and Bingzhongluo's secondary school.

=== Current church building ===
The church site was returned to local Catholics in the 1980s. The church building was rebuilt in 1996, and it was expanded in 2006. The current church building has one floor and covers an area of 320 square metres (3,400 sq ft). According to Chen Haozhou, it is significantly smaller than the original church. The building is made of brick and timber, and covered in stone tiles. It has a Xuanshan roof, and the two towers have tented roofs. The current church also has windows with semicircular arches. On the inside, there are Chinese-style murals depicting Catholic themes. The new church building no longer has the Basilica form or the colonnades. Instead, there is a walkway in the middle and pews on both sides.

Outside of the church, only the north side building of the Siheyuan courtyard remains. The first floor is the office of the priest and houses a small exhibition about the history of the church. The second floor is used to store religious items. Before the church was rebuilt, villagers attended mass at this building.

== Gallery ==
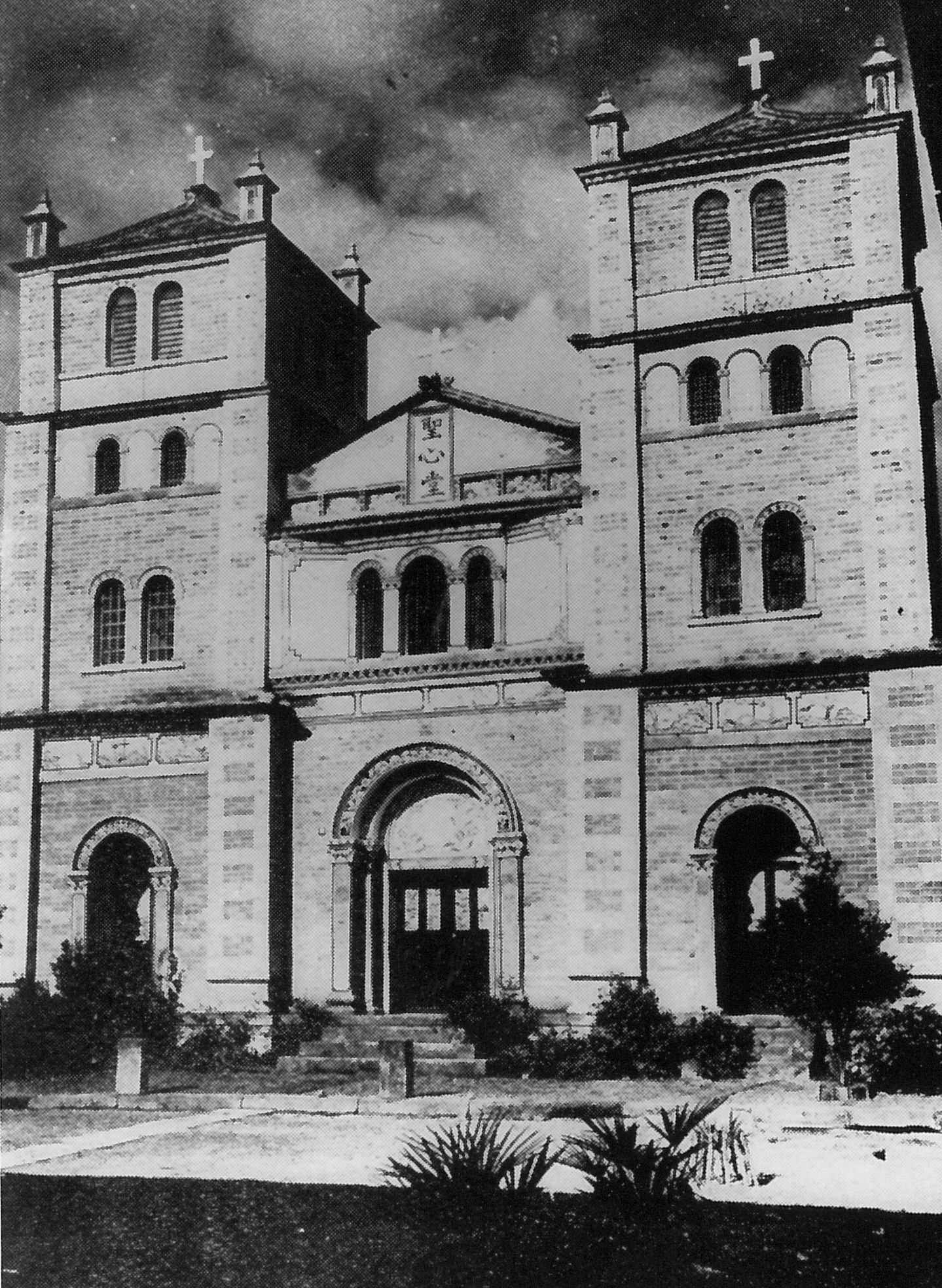
Original church building

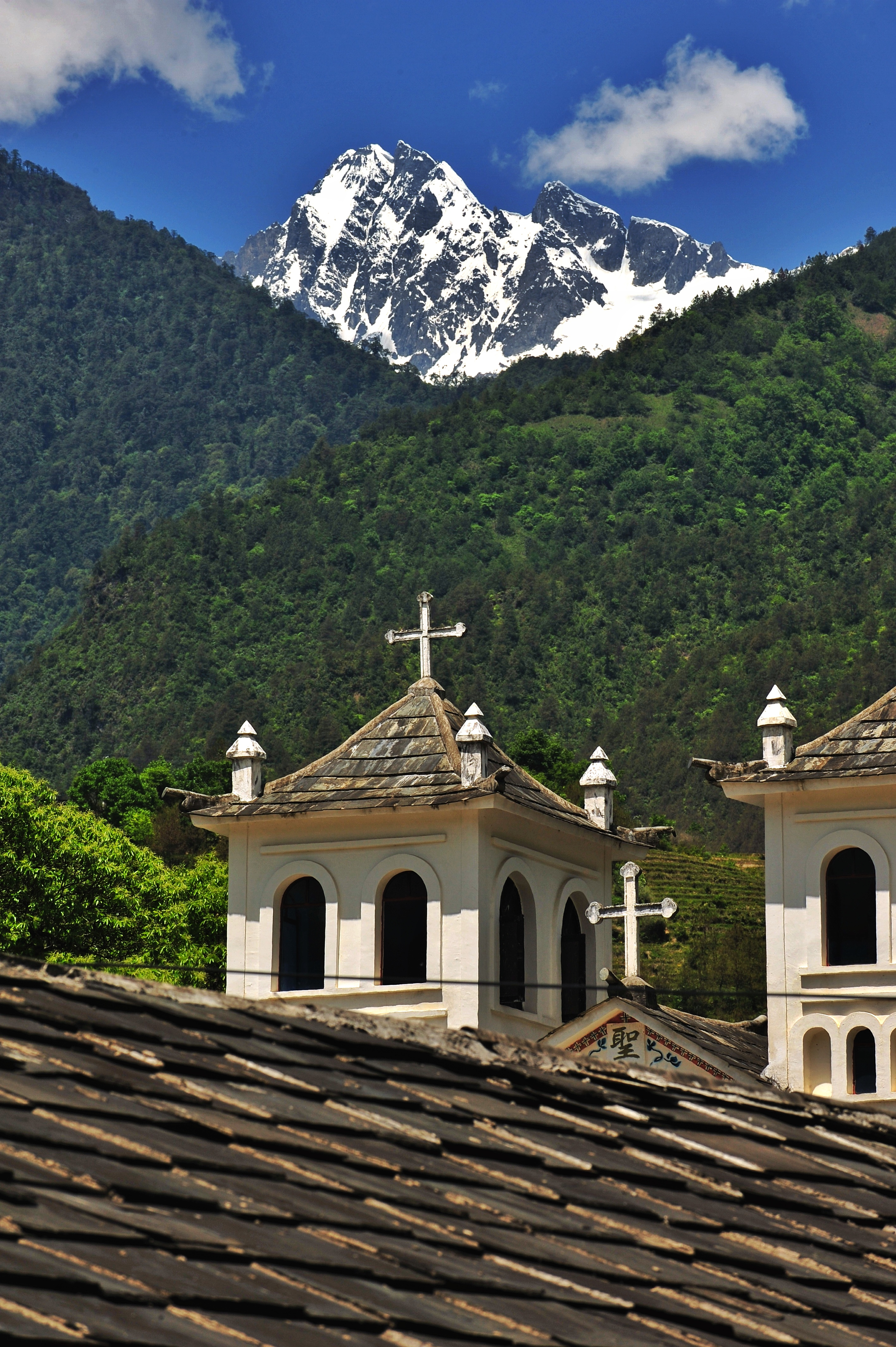
The towers of the church in the Nujiang River valley, 2011

== See also ==
- Catholic Church in Tibet
- Catholic Church in Sichuan
- Our Lady of the Sacred Heart Church, Yerkalo
