= Vauziron =

- Location within France Location within Auvergne-Rhône-Alpes

Location
- Country: France

Physical characteristics
- Mouth: Dore
  - coordinates: 45.9996°N 3.4749°E
- Length: 14.4 km (8.9 mi)

Basin features
- Progression: Dore→ Allier→ Loire→ Atlantic Ocean

The Vauziron is a stream that flows through Châteldon in Puy-de-Dôme, France. It is a right tributary of the river Dore. It is 14.4 km (8.9 mi) long.
