= Chambon-sur-Dolore =

- Commune
- Location of Chambon-sur-Dolore
- Location within France Location within Auvergne-Rhône-Alpes
- Coordinates: 45°29′52″N 3°36′49″E
- Country: France
- Region: Auvergne-Rhône-Alpes
- Department: Puy-de-Dôme
- Arrondissement: Ambert
- Canton: Les Monts du Livradois
- Intercommunality: Ambert Livradois Forez

Government
  - Mayor (2020–2026): Jean-Pierre Genestier
- Area^{1}: 19.70 km^{2} (7.61 sq mi)
- Elevation: 960 m (3,150 ft)
- Highest elevation: 1,208 m (3,963 ft)
- Lowest elevation: 887 m (2,910 ft)
- Population (2023): 141
  - Density: 7.16/km^{2} (18.5/sq mi)
- Time zone: UTC+01:00 (CET)
  - Summer (DST): UTC+02:00 (CEST)
- INSEE/Postal code: 63076 /63980
- ^{1} French Land Register data, which excludes lakes, ponds, glaciers > 1 km^{2} (0.386 sq mi or 247 acres) and river estuaries.

Chambon-sur-Dolore (French pronunciation: [ʃɑ̃bɔ̃ syʁ dɔlɔʁ], literally Chambon on Dolore; Occitan: Vès Chambon de Dolòra) is a commune in the Puy-de-Dôme department in Auvergne-Rhône-Alpes in central France.

== See also ==
- Communes of the Puy-de-Dôme department
