= Fournols =

- Commune
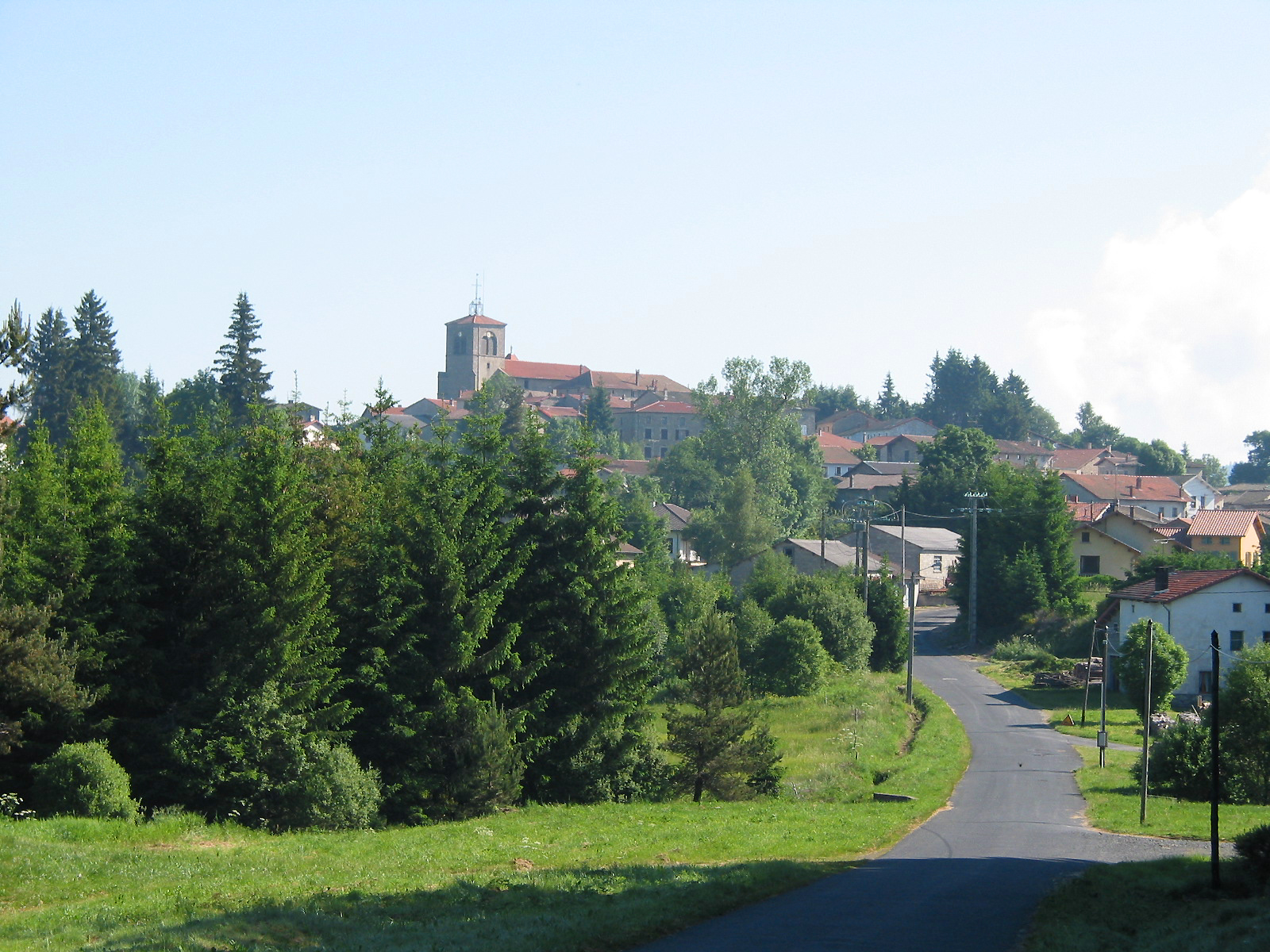
- A general view of Fournols

- Coat of arms
- Location of Fournols
- Location within France Location within Auvergne-Rhône-Alpes
- Coordinates: 45°31′05″N 3°35′21″E
- Country: France
- Region: Auvergne-Rhône-Alpes
- Department: Puy-de-Dôme
- Arrondissement: Ambert
- Canton: Les Monts du Livradois
- Intercommunality: Ambert Livradois Forez

Government
  - Mayor (2026–32): Bruno Paul
- Area^{1}: 29.02 km^{2} (11.20 sq mi)
- Highest elevation: 1,200 m (3,900 ft)
- Lowest elevation: 938 m (3,077 ft)
- Population (2023): 313
  - Density: 10.8/km^{2} (27.9/sq mi)
- Time zone: UTC+01:00 (CET)
  - Summer (DST): UTC+02:00 (CEST)
- INSEE/Postal code: 63162 /63980
- ^{1} French Land Register data, which excludes lakes, ponds, glaciers > 1 km^{2} (0.386 sq mi or 247 acres) and river estuaries.

Fournols (French pronunciation: [fuʁnɔl]; Occitan: Fornòls) is a commune in the Puy-de-Dôme department in Auvergne-Rhône-Alpes region in central France.

== See also ==
- Communes of the Puy-de-Dôme department
