= Olliergues =

- Commune
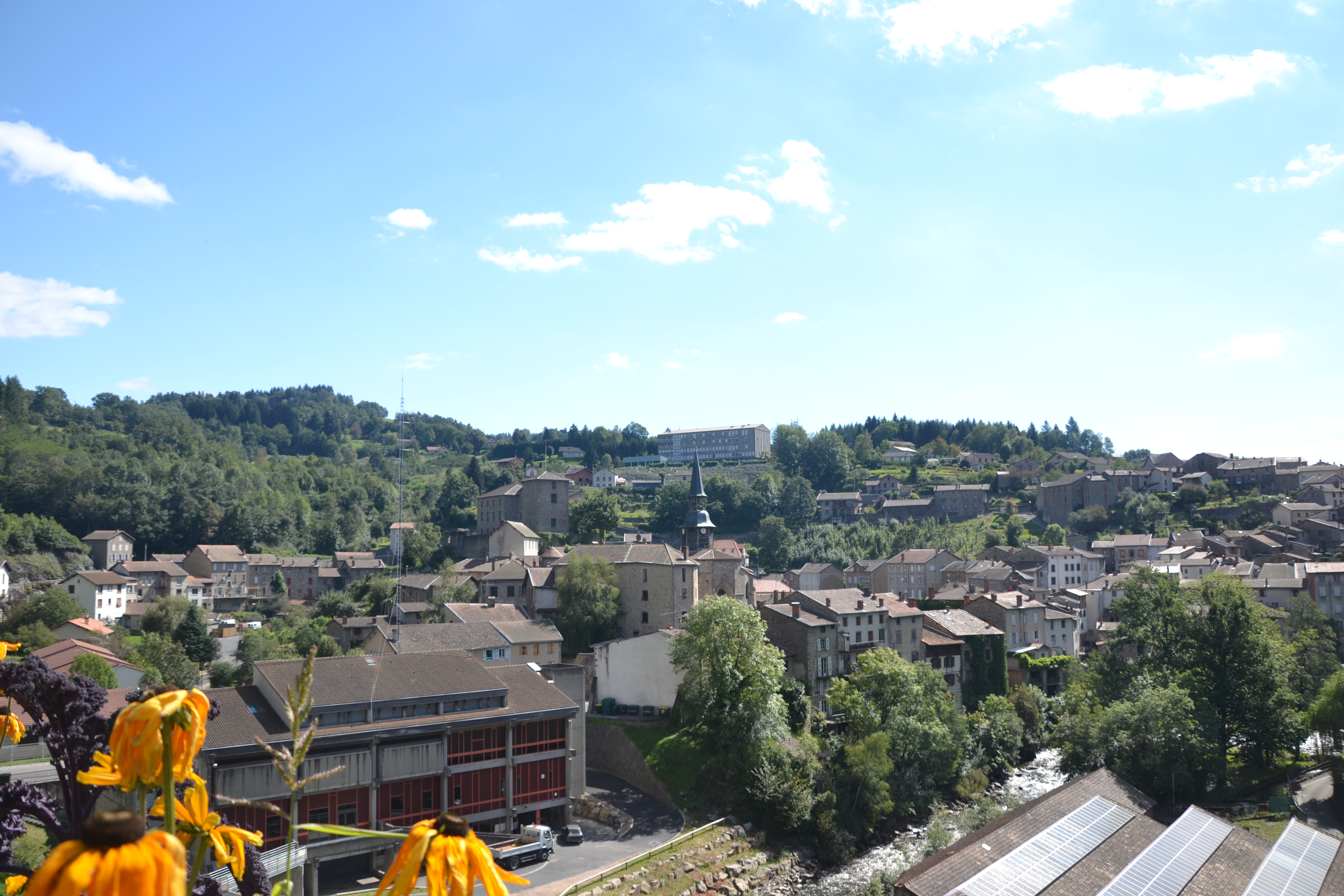
- A general view of Olliergues

- Coat of arms
- Location of Olliergues
- Location within France Location within Auvergne-Rhône-Alpes
- Coordinates: 45°40′30″N 3°38′13″E
- Country: France
- Region: Auvergne-Rhône-Alpes
- Department: Puy-de-Dôme
- Arrondissement: Ambert
- Canton: Les Monts du Livradois

Government
  - Mayor (2026–32): Arnaud Provenchere
- Area^{1}: 16.41 km^{2} (6.34 sq mi)
- Elevation: 432 m (1,417 ft)
- Highest elevation: 663 m (2,175 ft)
- Lowest elevation: 382 m (1,253 ft)
- Population (2023): 736
  - Density: 44.9/km^{2} (116/sq mi)
- Time zone: UTC+01:00 (CET)
  - Summer (DST): UTC+02:00 (CEST)
- INSEE/Postal code: 63258 /63880
- ^{1} French Land Register data, which excludes lakes, ponds, glaciers > 1 km^{2} (0.386 sq mi or 247 acres) and river estuaries.

Olliergues (French pronunciation: [ɔljɛʁɡ]; Occitan: Olhargues) is a commune in the Puy-de-Dôme department in Auvergne in central France.

== See also ==
- Communes of the Puy-de-Dôme department
