= Château de Viverols =

Castle in Auvergne-Rhône-Alpes, France

Coordinates: 45°26′4″N 3°52′51″E

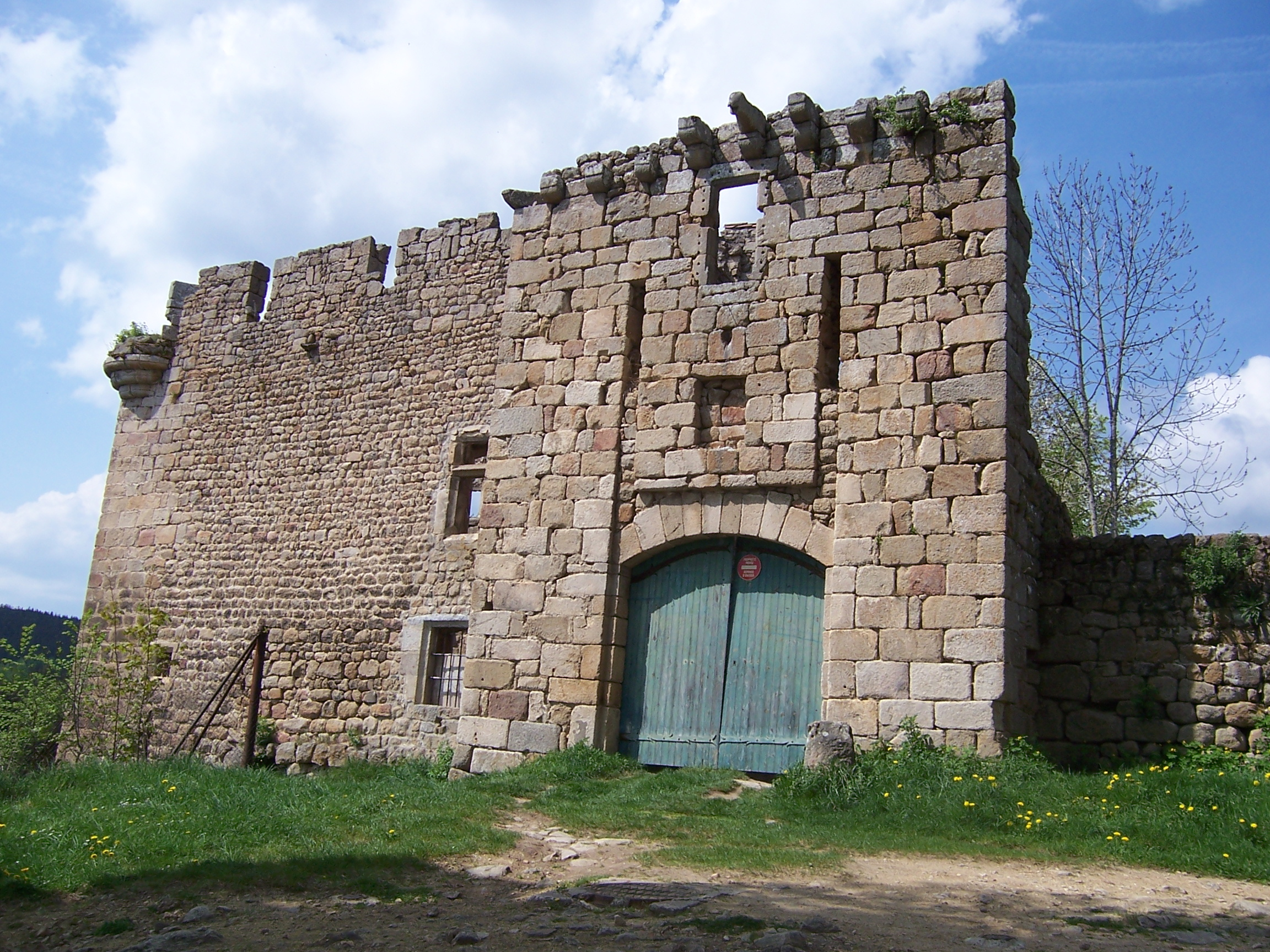
Castle entrance

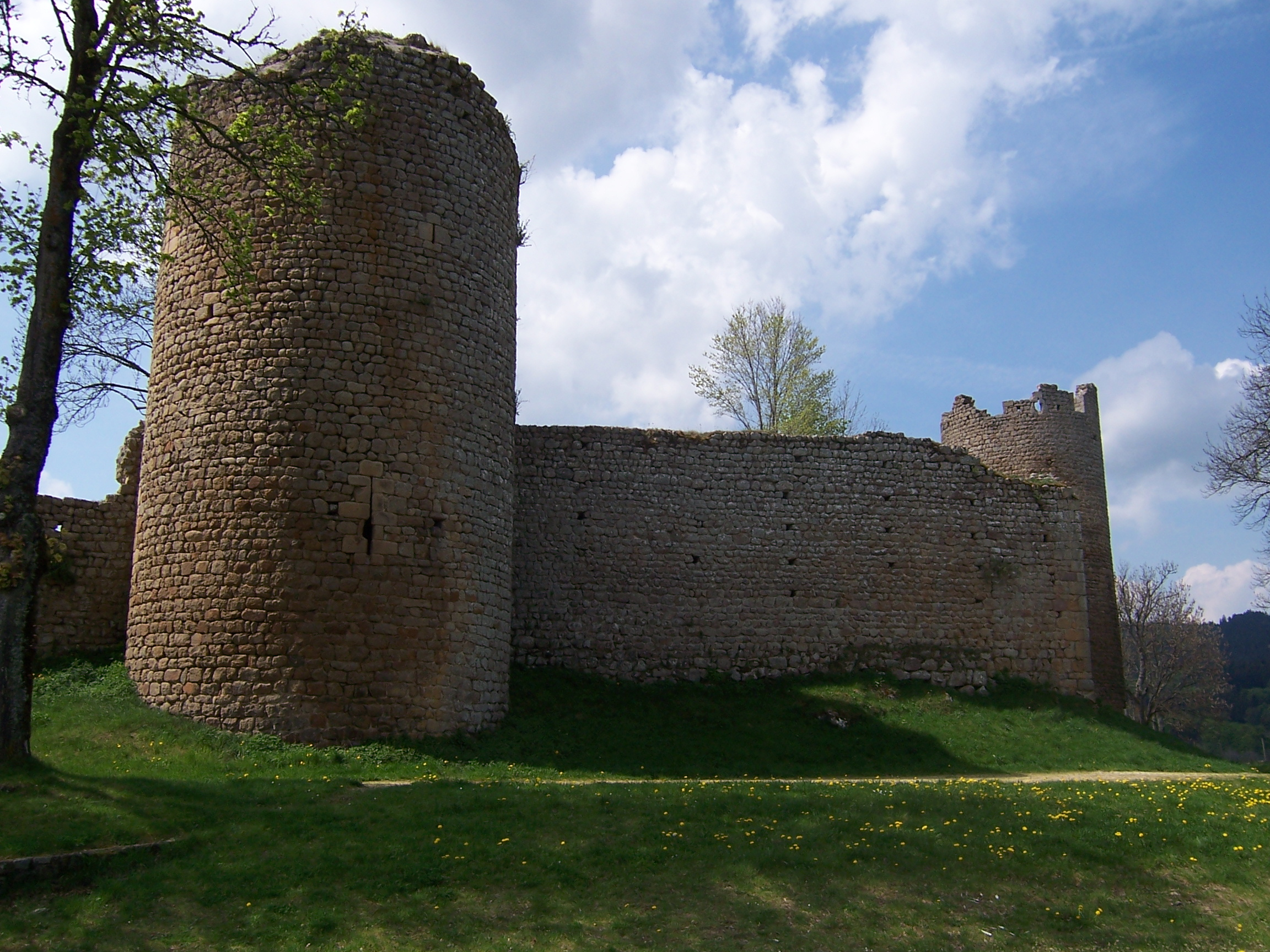
Towers

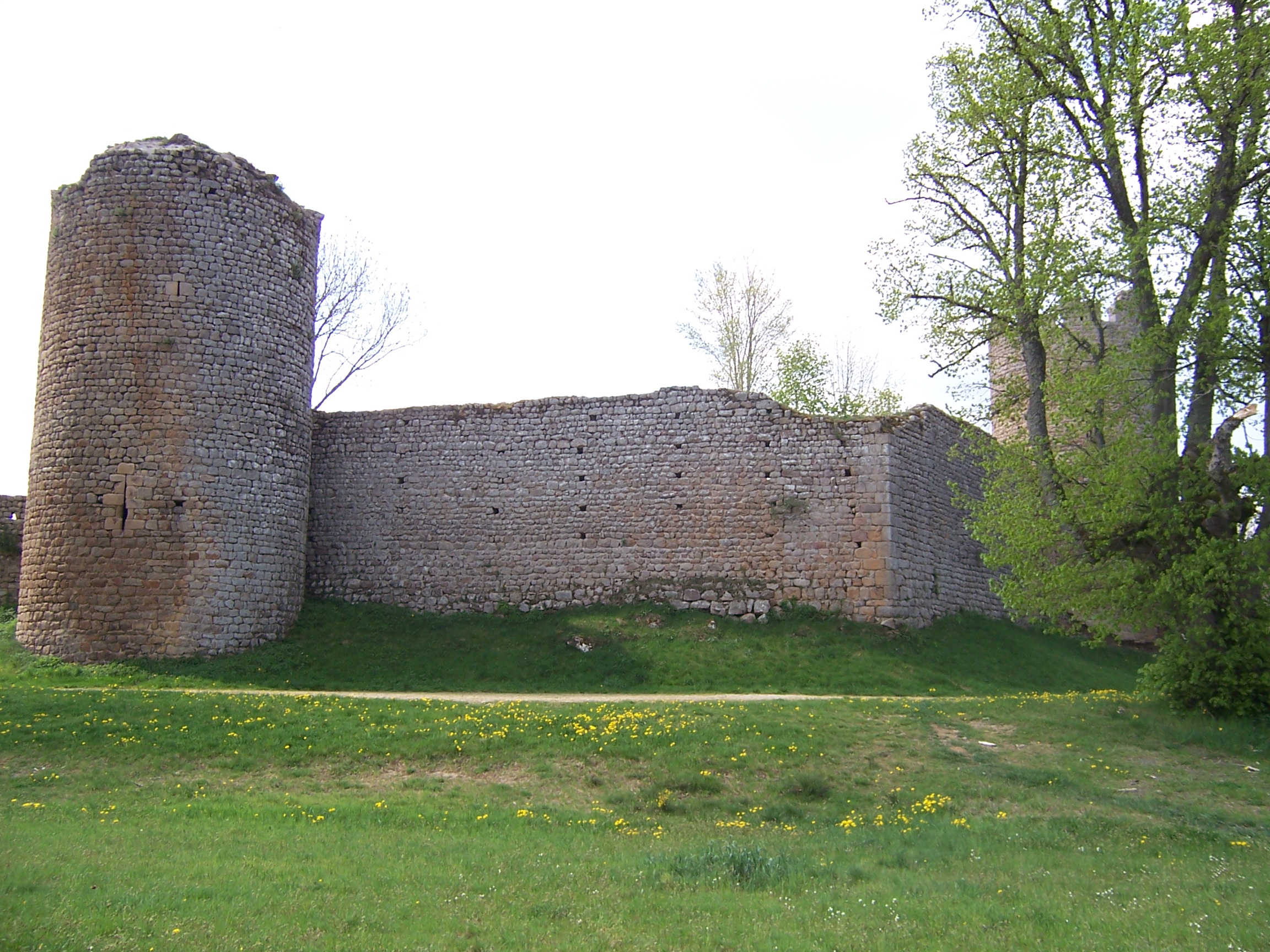
Towers

The Château de Viverols is a castle in Viverols in the Puy-de-Dôme département of France.

== History ==
The history of the castle is closely connected with the family of the lords of Baffie. In 1095, the Bishop of Clermont, Guillaume de Baffie, gave the lands to the Abbey of Sauxillanges before leaving for the First Crusade. Around 1219, the family built a castle on a hill in Viverols with the aim of controlling the trade route over the Chemintrand Pass between Ambert and Usson-en-Forez and to close off the southernmost part of their lands. In the 14th century, the castle was sold to the lords of Allègre; their arms still decorate the castle gateway. During the French Revolution, the castle was declared a national asset. It was gradually dismantled during the 19th century by the local population.

== Description ==
Significant construction took place in the 13th, 16th and 17th centuries.

In an almost pentagonal plan, the remains of the castle consist of four towers with an entry pavilion. The western side of the enceinte comprises a residential building with a tower at each end. The southern face is in two parts, to the left there was a residential building now destroyed. Two towers have arrowslits and appear to be from the 13th century, as do their curtain walls and the lower parts of the western building. The latter was remodelled during the 16th century and has mullioned windows. It contains chimneys and a spiral staircase in the tower. The entry building must be from the beginning of the 17th century, and still has traces of the chains and the platform of the old drawbridge. The building on its left, also 17th century, has a watch tower. At the bottom of the southern curtain wall is a 13th-century postern. The house in the centre of the courtyard is 16th century, as is the well with armorial bearings located in the second courtyard.

The castle is privately owned and has been listed since 1926 as a monument historique by the French Ministry of Culture.

== See also ==
- List of castles in France
