= Saint-Alyre-d'Arlanc =

- Commune
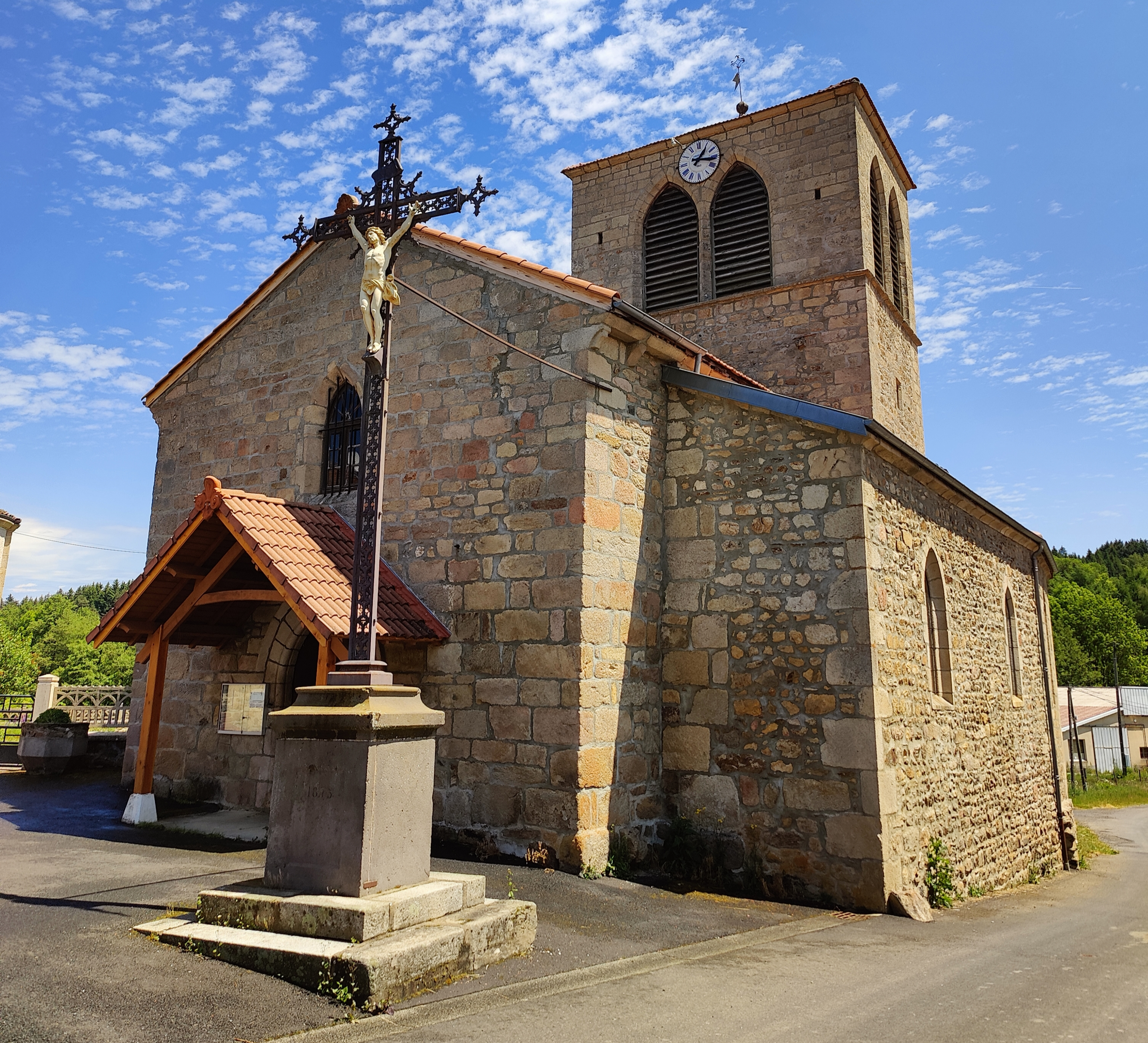
- Saint-Jean-Baptiste church
- Location of Saint-Alyre-d'Arlanc
- Location within France Location within Auvergne-Rhône-Alpes
- Coordinates: 45°22′09″N 3°38′21″E
- Country: France
- Region: Auvergne-Rhône-Alpes
- Department: Puy-de-Dôme
- Arrondissement: Ambert
- Canton: Ambert
- Intercommunality: Ambert Livradois Forez

Government
  - Mayor (2026–32): André Prisset
- Area^{1}: 24.19 km^{2} (9.34 sq mi)
- Elevation: 845 m (2,772 ft)
- Highest elevation: 1,053 m (3,455 ft)
- Lowest elevation: 820 m (2,690 ft)
- Population (2023): 132
  - Density: 5.46/km^{2} (14.1/sq mi)
- Time zone: UTC+01:00 (CET)
  - Summer (DST): UTC+02:00 (CEST)
- INSEE/Postal code: 63312 /63220
- ^{1} French Land Register data, which excludes lakes, ponds, glaciers > 1 km^{2} (0.386 sq mi or 247 acres) and river estuaries.

Saint-Alyre-d'Arlanc (French pronunciation: [sɛ̃.t‿aliʁ daʁlɑ̃], literally Saint-Alyre of Arlanc; Auvergnat: Sent Alire d'Arlanc) is a commune in the Puy-de-Dôme department in Auvergne in central France.

== Geography ==
It is situated on the D999 road and almost midway between the cities of Clermont-Ferrand and Saint-Étienne at the heart of the Parc naturel régional Livradois-Forez.

The village is surrounded by pine forest with wild mushrooms to be found in the woods during autumn, rolling countryside and it is on the pilgrim trail. 9 km to the south is the mediaeval abbey town of La Chaise-Dieu.

== Population ==
The village has a population of 50 permanent year round residents, which swells to 3-400 during the summer months.

The mayor, elected in 2020, is Olivier Bourron. The annual Fête Patronale is held over the weekend of the third Sunday in July.

== See also ==
- Communes of the Puy-de-Dôme department
