= Saint Ferréol =

Saint Ferréol may refer to:

== People ==
- Ferréol and Ferjeux (Ferreolus and Ferrutio), priest and deacon, martyrs and patrons of Besançon
- Saint Ferréol of Uzès (died 581), bishop of Uzès

== Places ==
=== Canada ===
- Saint-Ferréol-les-Neiges, Quebec

=== France ===
Saint-Ferréol is the name or part of the name of several communes in France:

- Saint-Ferréol-de-Comminges, in the Haute-Garonne département
- Saint-Ferréol, Haute-Savoie, in the Haute-Savoie département
- Saint-Ferréol-d'Auroure, in the Haute-Loire département
- Saint-Ferréol-des-Côtes, in the Puy-de-Dôme département
- Saint-Ferréol-Trente-Pas, in the Drôme département
- Bassin de Saint-Ferréol, an artificial lake supplying water to the Canal du Midi
