= Arrondissement of Ambert =

Coordinates: 45°33′N 3°45′E

Ambert
- Arrondissement
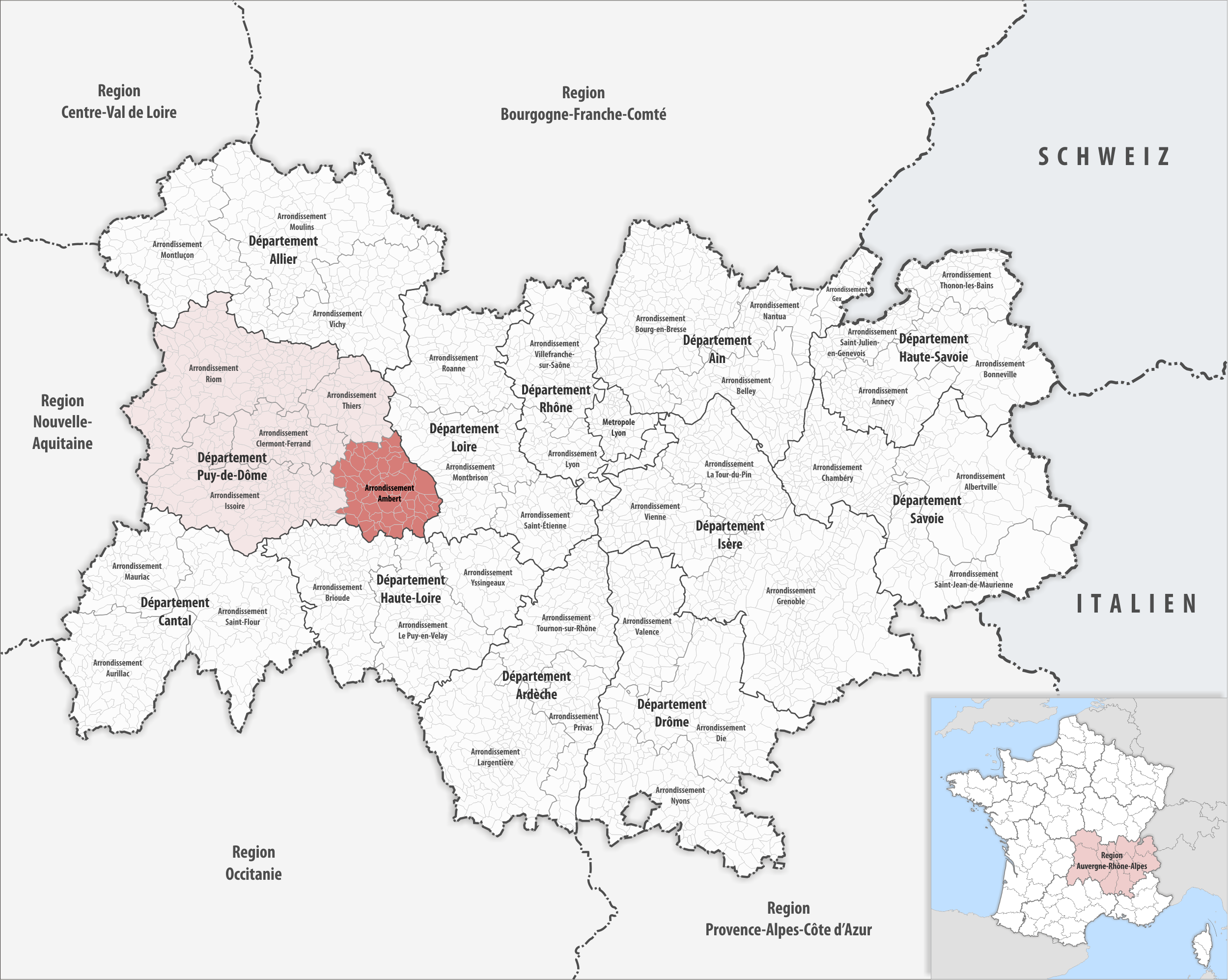
- Location within the region Auvergne-Rhône-Alpes
- Country: France
- Region: Auvergne-Rhône-Alpes
- Department: Puy-de-Dôme
- No. of communes: {{{nbcomm}}}
- Area: 1,229.8 km^{2} (474.8 sq mi)
- Population (2023): 27,687
  - Density: 22.513/km^{2} (58.309/sq mi)
- INSEE code: 631

The arrondissement of Ambert is an arrondissement of France in the Puy-de-Dôme department in the Auvergne-Rhône-Alpes region. It has 58 communes. Its population is 27,571 (2021), and its area is 1,229.8 km^{2} (474.8 sq mi).

== Composition ==
The communes of the arrondissement of Ambert, and their INSEE codes, are:

1. Aix-la-Fayette (63002)
2. Ambert (63003)
3. Arlanc (63010)
4. Auzelles (63023)
5. Baffie (63027)
6. Bertignat (63037)
7. Beurières (63039)
8. Brousse (63056)
9. Le Brugeron (63057)
10. Ceilloux (63065)
11. Chambon-sur-Dolore (63076)
12. Champétières (63081)
13. La Chapelle-Agnon (63086)
14. La Chaulme (63104)
15. Chaumont-le-Bourg (63105)
16. Condat-lès-Montboissier (63119)
17. Cunlhat (63132)
18. Domaize (63136)
19. Doranges (63137)
20. Dore-l'Église (63139)
21. Échandelys (63142)
22. Églisolles (63147)
23. Fayet-Ronaye (63158)
24. La Forie (63161)
25. Fournols (63162)
26. Grandrif (63173)
27. Grandval (63174)
28. Job (63179)
29. Marat (63207)
30. Marsac-en-Livradois (63211)
31. Mayres (63218)
32. Medeyrolles (63221)
33. Le Monestier (63230)
34. Novacelles (63256)
35. Olliergues (63258)
36. Saillant (63309)
37. Saint-Alyre-d'Arlanc (63312)
38. Saint-Amant-Roche-Savine (63314)
39. Saint-Anthème (63319)
40. Saint-Bonnet-le-Bourg (63323)
41. Saint-Bonnet-le-Chastel (63324)
42. Saint-Clément-de-Valorgue (63331)
43. Sainte-Catherine (63328)
44. Saint-Éloy-la-Glacière (63337)
45. Saint-Ferréol-des-Côtes (63341)
46. Saint-Germain-l'Herm (63353)
47. Saint-Gervais-sous-Meymont (63355)
48. Saint-Just (63371)
49. Saint-Martin-des-Olmes (63374)
50. Saint-Pierre-la-Bourlhonne (63384)
51. Saint-Romain (63394)
52. Saint-Sauveur-la-Sagne (63398)
53. Sauvessanges (63412)
54. Thiolières (63431)
55. Tours-sur-Meymont (63434)
56. Valcivières (63441)
57. Vertolaye (63454)
58. Viverols (63465)

== History ==
The arrondissement of Ambert was created in 1800, disbanded in 1926 and restored in 1942. At the January 2017 reorganisation of the arrondissements of Puy-de-Dôme, it gained three communes from the arrondissement of Clermont-Ferrand.

As a result of the reorganisation of the cantons of France which came into effect in 2015, the borders of the cantons are no longer related to the borders of the arrondissements. The cantons of the arrondissement of Ambert were, as of January 2015:

1. Ambert
2. Arlanc
3. Cunlhat
4. Olliergues
5. Saint-Amant-Roche-Savine
6. Saint-Anthème
7. Saint-Germain-l'Herm
8. Viverols
