= Château de Bostfranchet =

Castle ruins in Auvergne-Rhône-Alpes, France

Coordinates: 45°28′10″N 3°54′13″E

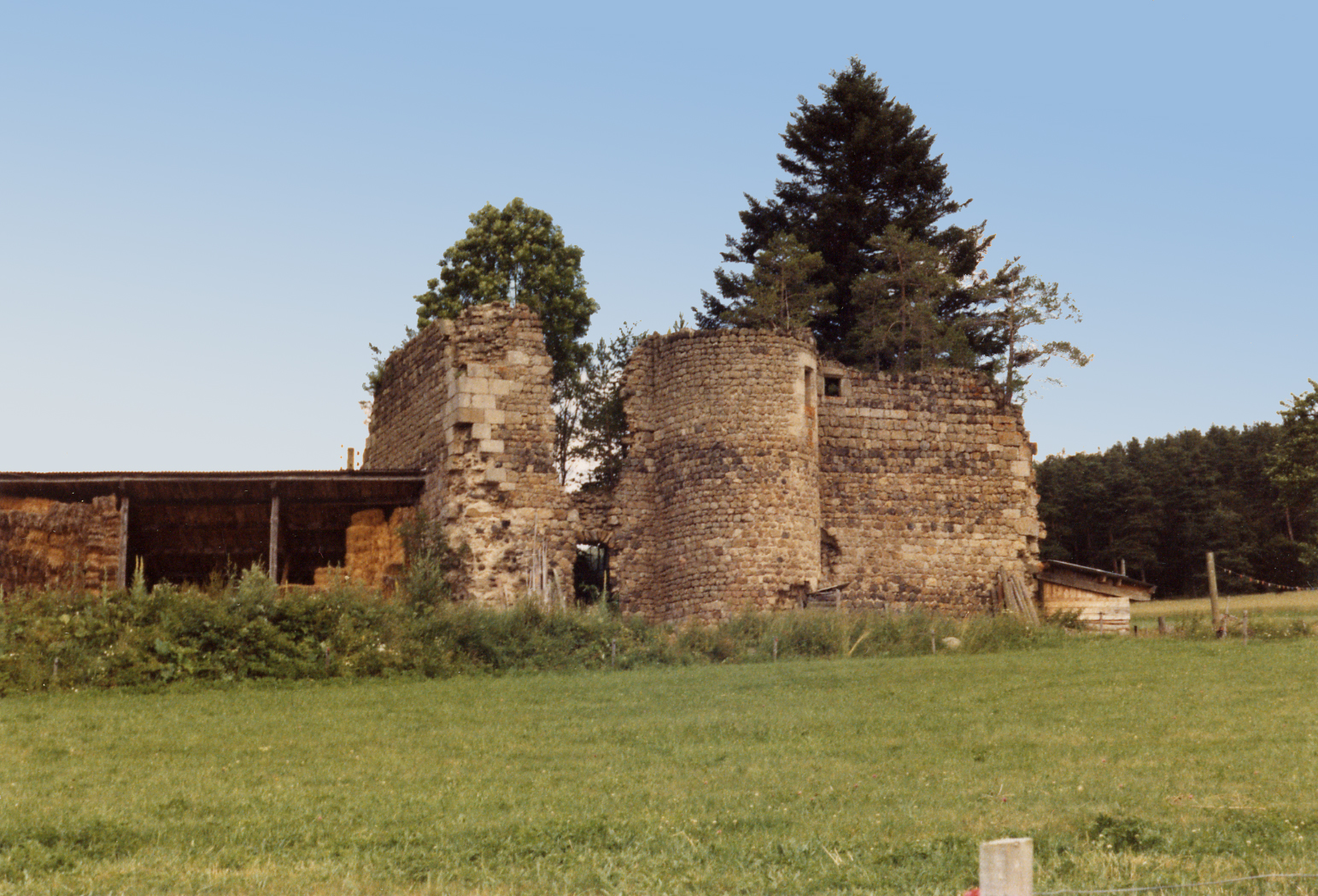
Château de Bostfranchet

The ruins of the Château de Bostfranchet can be found on the Bostfranchet estate in the Saillant commune of the Puy-de-Dôme département, France.

Occupied from the 12th century by the Pelet family, originally from the Narbonnais region, Bostfranchet is the cradle of the Beaufranchet (or Pelet de Beaufranchet) family. A manor house there was fortified under Charles I, Duke of Bourbon; walls, fortified towers and ditches were built.

In 1874 a report to the Académie des sciences, belles-lettres et arts de Clermont-Ferrand noted that only ruins of the castle remained and that these were of little importance.

All that remains now is a ruined tower of the castle. A farm occupies the main space. The arms of the Beaufranchet family can be seen carved into a stone well in the central courtyard.

== Origin of name ==
From "bost" (le bois = wood) and "francha" (franc = exempt from taxes)

== See also ==
- List of castles in France
- Photo
- The Beaufranchet Family in French Wikipedia
