= Saint-Clément-de-Valorgue =

- Commune
- Coat of arms
- Location of Saint-Clément-de-Valorgue
- Location within France Location within Auvergne-Rhône-Alpes
- Coordinates: 45°30′04″N 3°55′19″E
- Country: France
- Region: Auvergne-Rhône-Alpes
- Department: Puy-de-Dôme
- Arrondissement: Ambert
- Canton: Ambert

Government
  - Mayor (2020–2026): Michel Rochette
- Area^{1}: 13.37 km^{2} (5.16 sq mi)
- Elevation: 919 m (3,015 ft)
- Highest elevation: 1,276 m (4,186 ft)
- Lowest elevation: 888 m (2,913 ft)
- Population (2023): 239
  - Density: 17.9/km^{2} (46.3/sq mi)
- Time zone: UTC+01:00 (CET)
  - Summer (DST): UTC+02:00 (CEST)
- INSEE/Postal code: 63331 /63660
- ^{1} French Land Register data, which excludes lakes, ponds, glaciers > 1 km^{2} (0.386 sq mi or 247 acres) and river estuaries.

Saint-Clément-de-Valorgue (French pronunciation: [sɛ̃ klemɑ̃ də valɔʁg]; Occitan: Sent Clamenç de Valòrga) is a commune in the Puy-de-Dôme department in Auvergne in central France.

== See also ==
- Communes of the Puy-de-Dôme department
