= Champétières =

- Commune
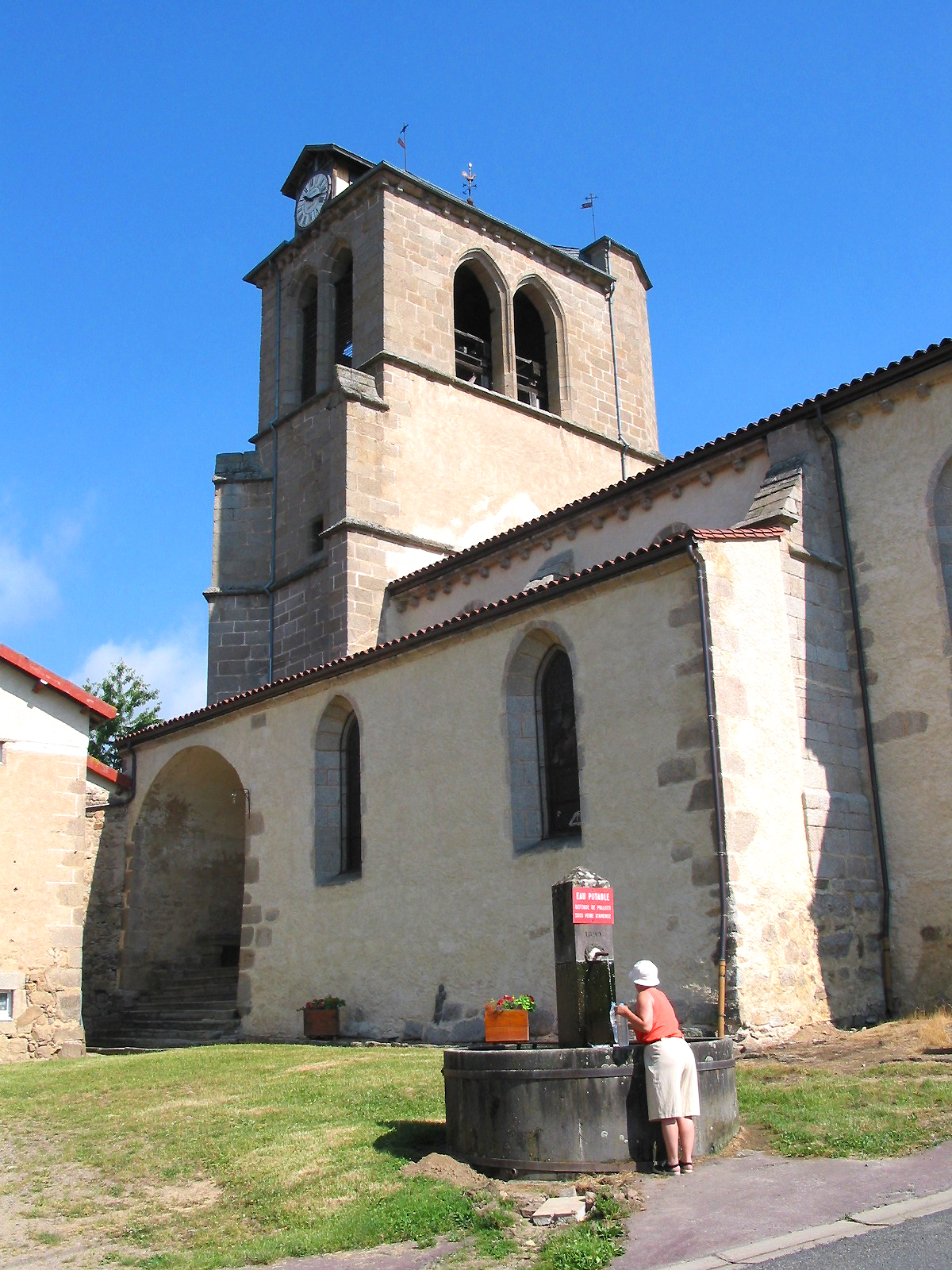
- Church of Saint-Sébastien

- Coat of arms
- Location of Champétières
- Location within France Location within Auvergne-Rhône-Alpes
- Coordinates: 45°31′14″N 3°41′42″E
- Country: France
- Region: Auvergne-Rhône-Alpes
- Department: Puy-de-Dôme
- Arrondissement: Ambert
- Canton: Ambert
- Intercommunality: Ambert Livradois Forez

Government
  - Mayor (2020–2026): Thierry Vernet
- Area^{1}: 18.54 km^{2} (7.16 sq mi)
- Elevation: 700 m (2,300 ft)
- Highest elevation: 1,205 m (3,953 ft)
- Lowest elevation: 534 m (1,752 ft)
- Population (2023): 282
  - Density: 15.2/km^{2} (39.4/sq mi)
- Time zone: UTC+01:00 (CET)
  - Summer (DST): UTC+02:00 (CEST)
- INSEE/Postal code: 63081 /63600
- ^{1} French Land Register data, which excludes lakes, ponds, glaciers > 1 km^{2} (0.386 sq mi or 247 acres) and river estuaries.

Champétières (French pronunciation: [ʃɑ̃petjɛʁ]; Occitan: Champitèiras) is a commune in the Puy-de-Dôme department in Auvergne-Rhône-Alpes in central France.

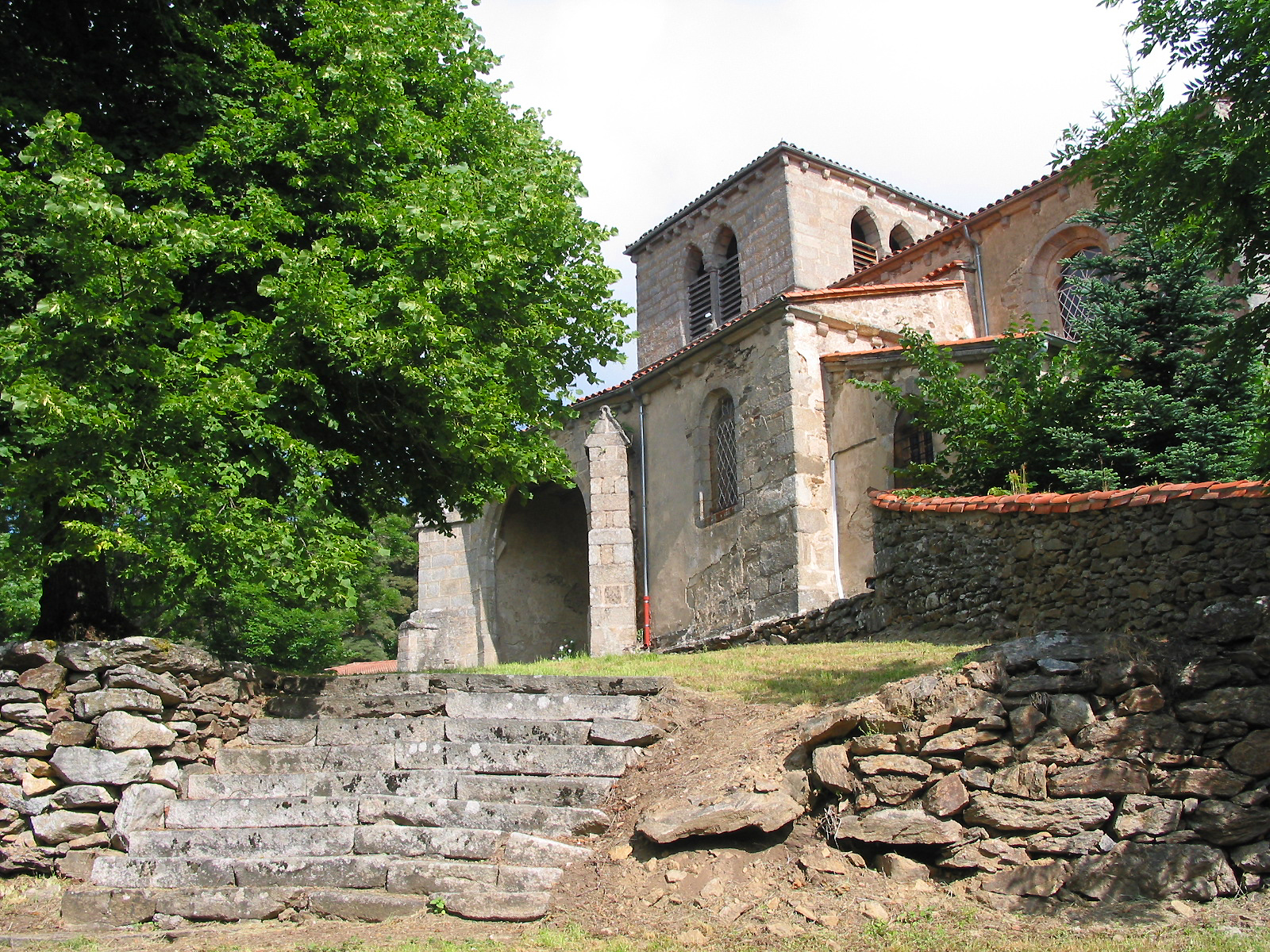
Church of Notre-Dame-de Mons (15th century).

== See also ==
- Communes of the Puy-de-Dôme department
