= Saint-Sauveur-la-Sagne =

- Commune
- Location of Saint-Sauveur-la-Sagne
- Location within France Location within Auvergne-Rhône-Alpes
- Coordinates: 45°23′42″N 3°40′01″E
- Country: France
- Region: Auvergne-Rhône-Alpes
- Department: Puy-de-Dôme
- Arrondissement: Ambert
- Canton: Ambert

Government
  - Mayor (2026–32): Roland Chalendar
- Area^{1}: 7.74 km^{2} (2.99 sq mi)
- Elevation: 814 m (2,671 ft)
- Highest elevation: 964 m (3,163 ft)
- Lowest elevation: 689 m (2,260 ft)
- Population (2023): 82
  - Density: 11/km^{2} (27/sq mi)
- Time zone: UTC+01:00 (CET)
  - Summer (DST): UTC+02:00 (CEST)
- INSEE/Postal code: 63398 /63220
- ^{1} French Land Register data, which excludes lakes, ponds, glaciers > 1 km^{2} (0.386 sq mi or 247 acres) and river estuaries.

Saint-Sauveur-la-Sagne (French pronunciation: [sɛ̃ sovœʁ la saɲ]; Auvergnat: Sant Sauvador de la Sanha) is a commune in the Puy-de-Dôme department in Auvergne-Rhône-Alpes in central France.

== See also ==
- Communes of the Puy-de-Dôme department
