= La Forie =

- Commune
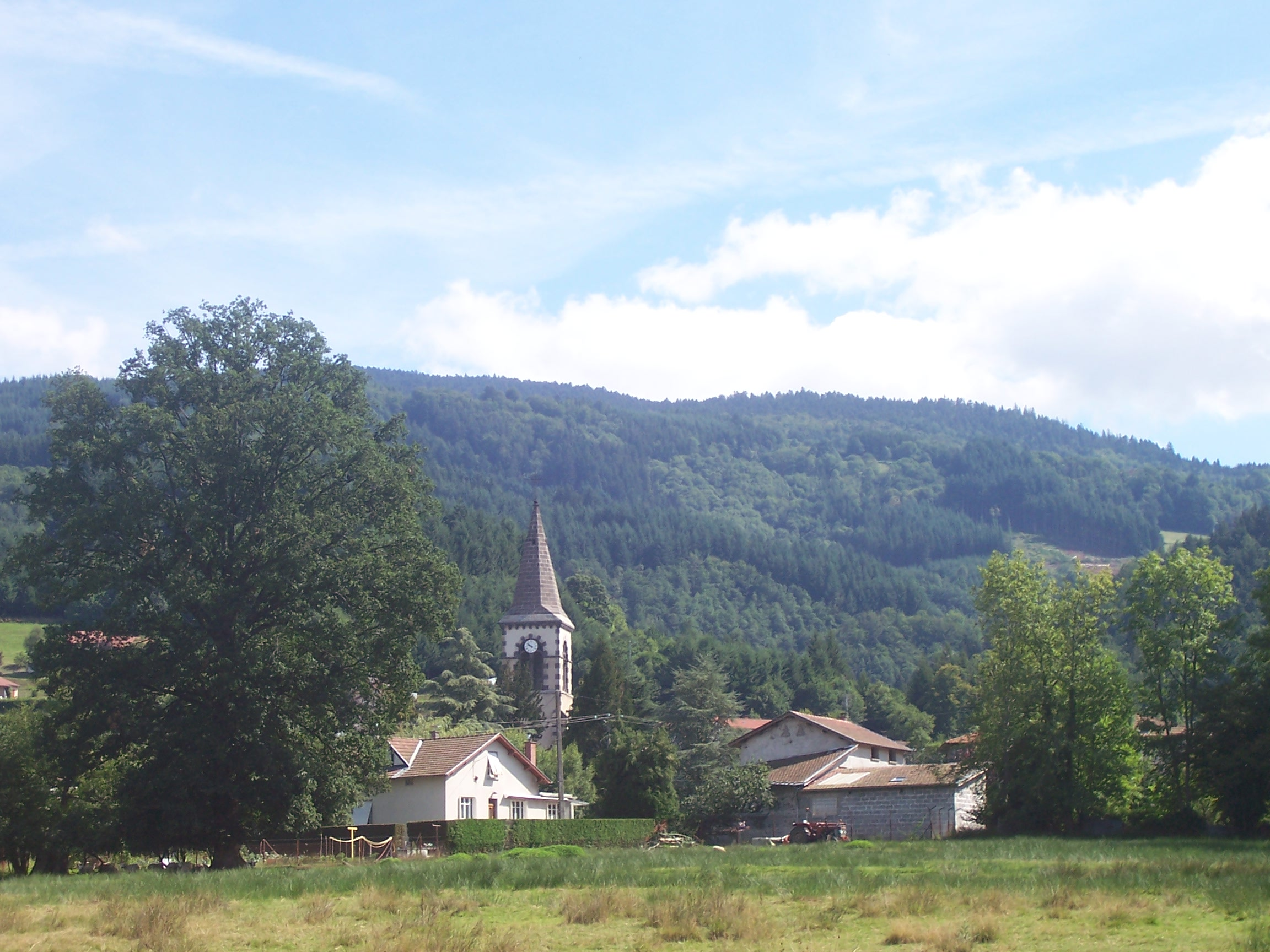
- A general view of La Forie
- Location of La Forie
- Location within France Location within Auvergne-Rhône-Alpes
- Coordinates: 45°35′30″N 3°45′45″E
- Country: France
- Region: Auvergne-Rhône-Alpes
- Department: Puy-de-Dôme
- Arrondissement: Ambert
- Canton: Ambert
- Intercommunality: Ambert Livradois Forez

Government
  - Mayor (2026–32): Jean-Luc Di Marco
- Area^{1}: 2.8 km^{2} (1.1 sq mi)
- Elevation: 530 m (1,740 ft)
- Highest elevation: 800 m (2,600 ft)
- Lowest elevation: 527 m (1,729 ft)
- Population (2023): 317
  - Density: 110/km^{2} (290/sq mi)
- Time zone: UTC+01:00 (CET)
  - Summer (DST): UTC+02:00 (CEST)
- INSEE/Postal code: 63161 /63600
- ^{1} French Land Register data, which excludes lakes, ponds, glaciers > 1 km^{2} (0.386 sq mi or 247 acres) and river estuaries.

La Forie (French pronunciation: [la fɔʁi]) is a commune in the Puy-de-Dôme department in Auvergne in central France.

== See also ==
- Communes of the Puy-de-Dôme department
