= Valcivières =

- Commune
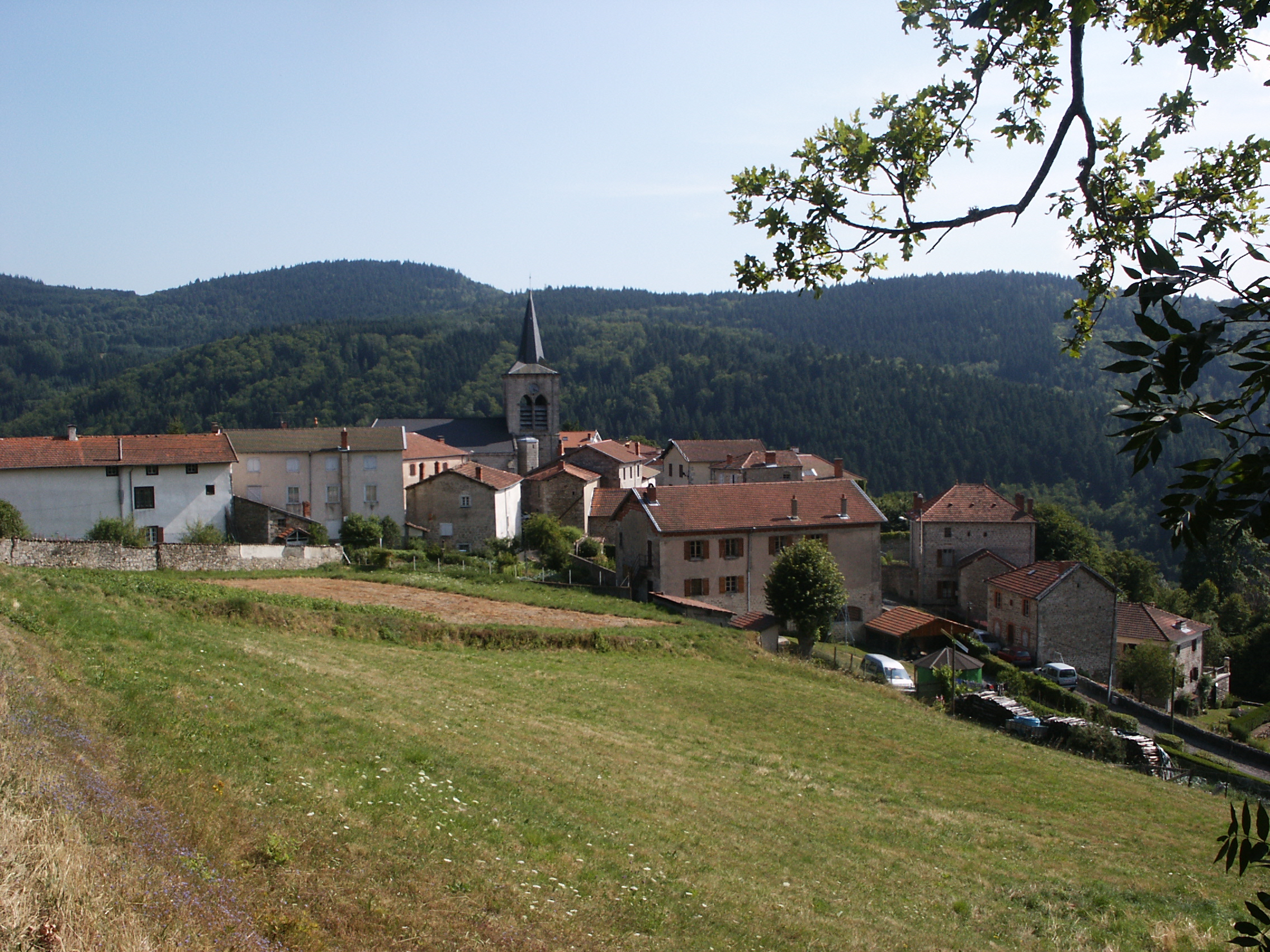
- Valcivières
- Location of Valcivières
- Location within France Location within Auvergne-Rhône-Alpes
- Coordinates: 45°35′34″N 3°47′47″E
- Country: France
- Region: Auvergne-Rhône-Alpes
- Department: Puy-de-Dôme
- Arrondissement: Ambert
- Canton: Ambert
- Intercommunality: Ambert Livradois Forez

Government
  - Mayor (2026–32): André Voldoire
- Area^{1}: 32.96 km^{2} (12.73 sq mi)
- Highest elevation: 1,556 m (5,105 ft)
- Lowest elevation: 651 m (2,136 ft)
- Population (2023): 227
  - Density: 6.89/km^{2} (17.8/sq mi)
- Demonym: Cheveyrand
- Time zone: UTC+01:00 (CET)
  - Summer (DST): UTC+02:00 (CEST)
- INSEE/Postal code: 63441 /63600
- ^{1} French Land Register data, which excludes lakes, ponds, glaciers > 1 km^{2} (0.386 sq mi or 247 acres) and river estuaries.

Valcivières (French pronunciation: [valsivjɛʁ]) is a commune in the Puy-de-Dôme department in Auvergne-Rhône-Alpes in central France.

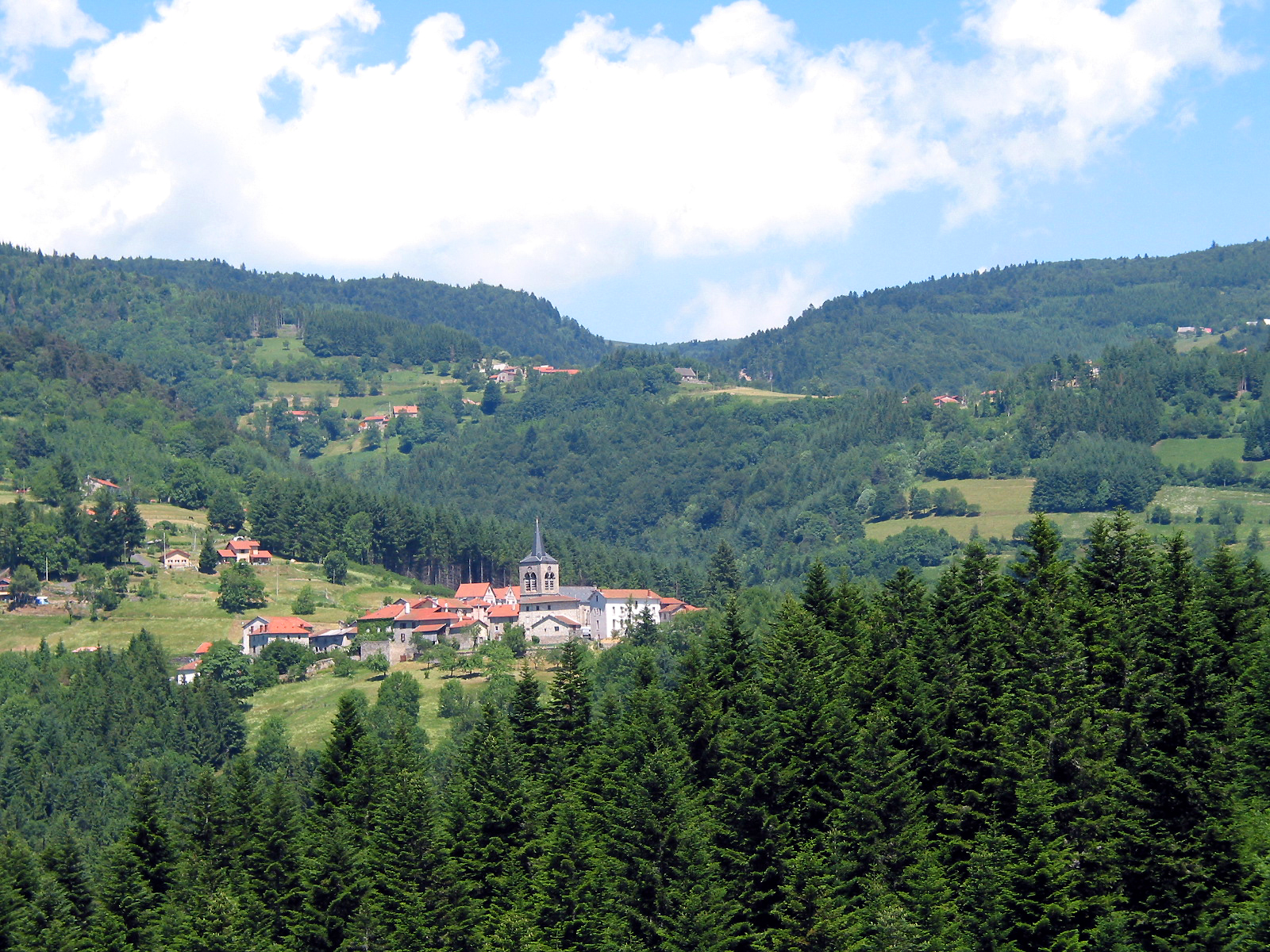
The village.

== See also ==
- Communes of the Puy-de-Dôme department
