= Thiolières =

- Commune
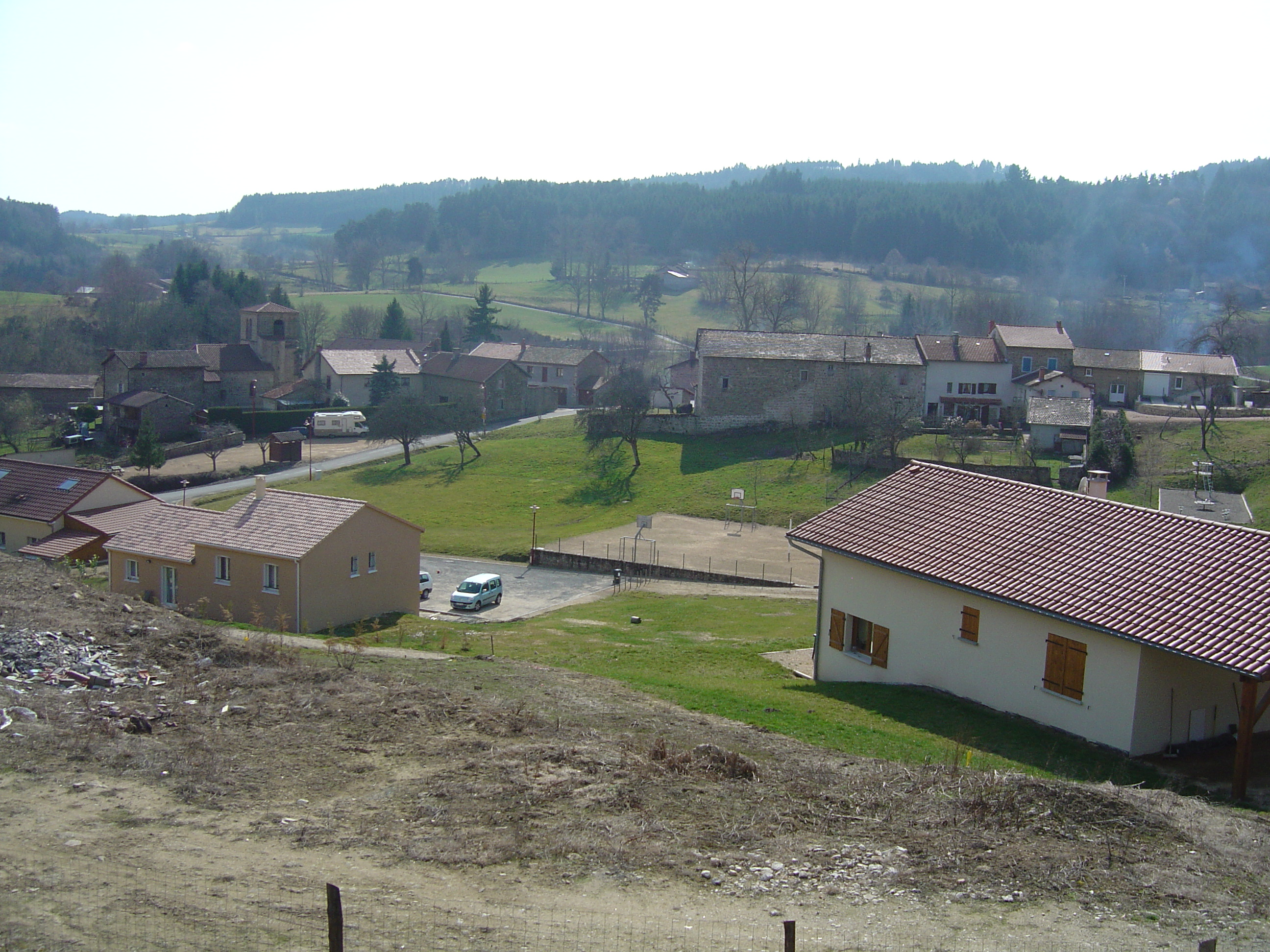
- A general view of Thiolières
- Location of Thiolières
- Location within France Location within Auvergne-Rhône-Alpes
- Coordinates: 45°35′06″N 3°41′31″E
- Country: France
- Region: Auvergne-Rhône-Alpes
- Department: Puy-de-Dôme
- Arrondissement: Ambert
- Canton: Ambert

Government
  - Mayor (2026–32): Mireille Fonlupt
- Area^{1}: 5.30 km^{2} (2.05 sq mi)
- Elevation: 710 m (2,330 ft)
- Highest elevation: 961 m (3,153 ft)
- Lowest elevation: 576 m (1,890 ft)
- Population (2023): 164
  - Density: 30.9/km^{2} (80.1/sq mi)
- Time zone: UTC+01:00 (CET)
  - Summer (DST): UTC+02:00 (CEST)
- INSEE/Postal code: 63431 /63600
- ^{1} French Land Register data, which excludes lakes, ponds, glaciers > 1 km^{2} (0.386 sq mi or 247 acres) and river estuaries.

Thiolières (French pronunciation: [tjɔljɛʁ]) is a commune in the Puy-de-Dôme department in Auvergne in central France.

== See also ==
- Communes of the Puy-de-Dôme department
