= Sauvessanges =

- Commune
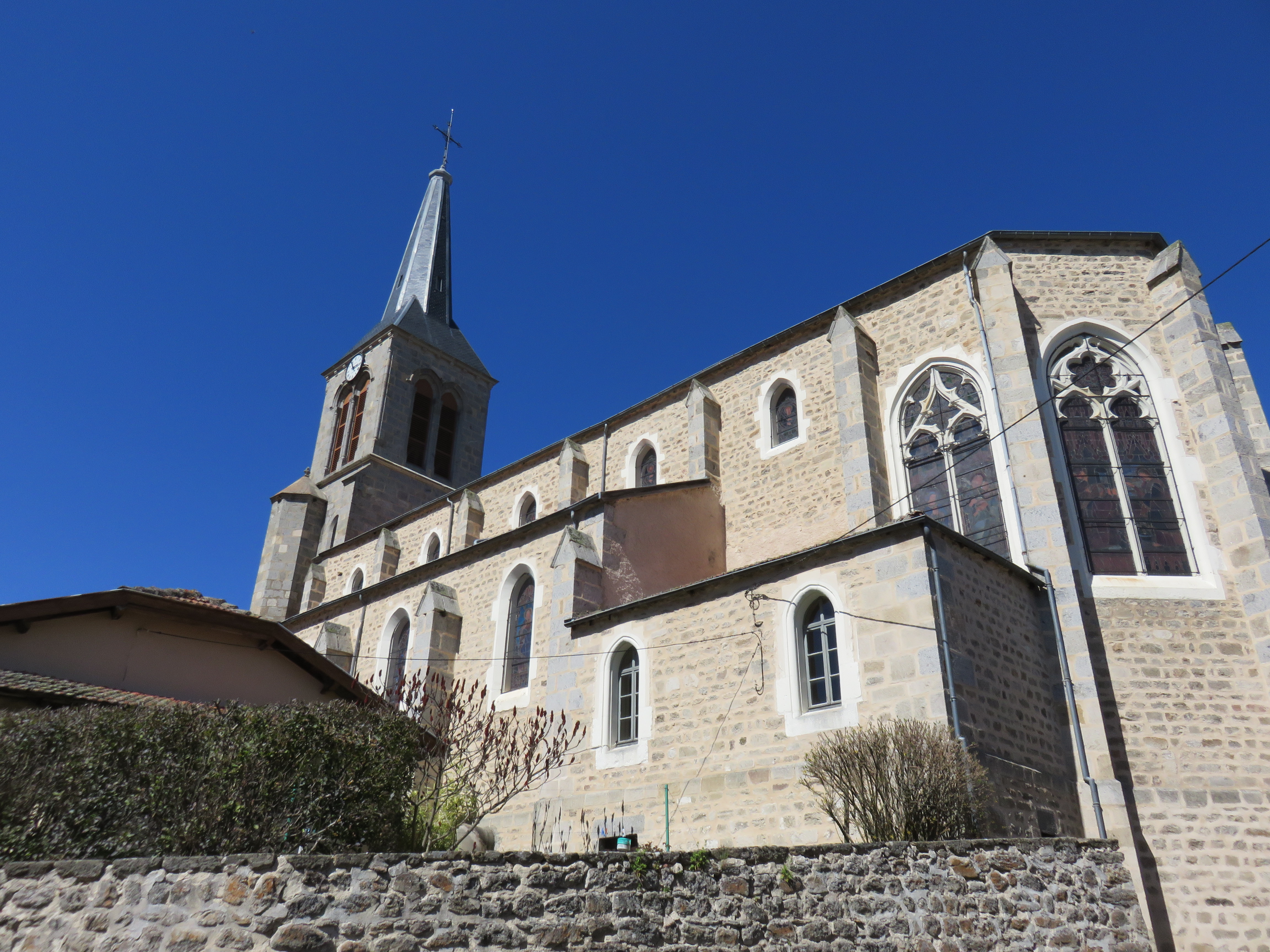
- Church of Sauvessanges in 2017

- Coat of arms
- Location of Sauvessanges
- Location within France Location within Auvergne-Rhône-Alpes
- Coordinates: 45°23′35″N 3°52′23″E
- Country: France
- Region: Auvergne-Rhône-Alpes
- Department: Puy-de-Dôme
- Arrondissement: Ambert
- Canton: Ambert

Government
  - Mayor (2026–32): Didier Ardevol
- Area^{1}: 33.19 km^{2} (12.81 sq mi)
- Elevation: 980 m (3,220 ft)
- Highest elevation: 1,142 m (3,747 ft)
- Lowest elevation: 776 m (2,546 ft)
- Population (2023): 531
  - Density: 16.0/km^{2} (41.4/sq mi)
- Time zone: UTC+01:00 (CET)
  - Summer (DST): UTC+02:00 (CEST)
- INSEE/Postal code: 63412 /63840
- ^{1} French Land Register data, which excludes lakes, ponds, glaciers > 1 km^{2} (0.386 sq mi or 247 acres) and river estuaries.

Sauvessanges (French pronunciation: [sovesɑ̃ʒ]) is a commune in the Puy-de-Dôme department in Auvergne-Rhône-Alpes in central France. It is around 40 km west of Saint-Étienne.

== See also ==
- Communes of the Puy-de-Dôme department
