= Chaumont-le-Bourg =

- Commune
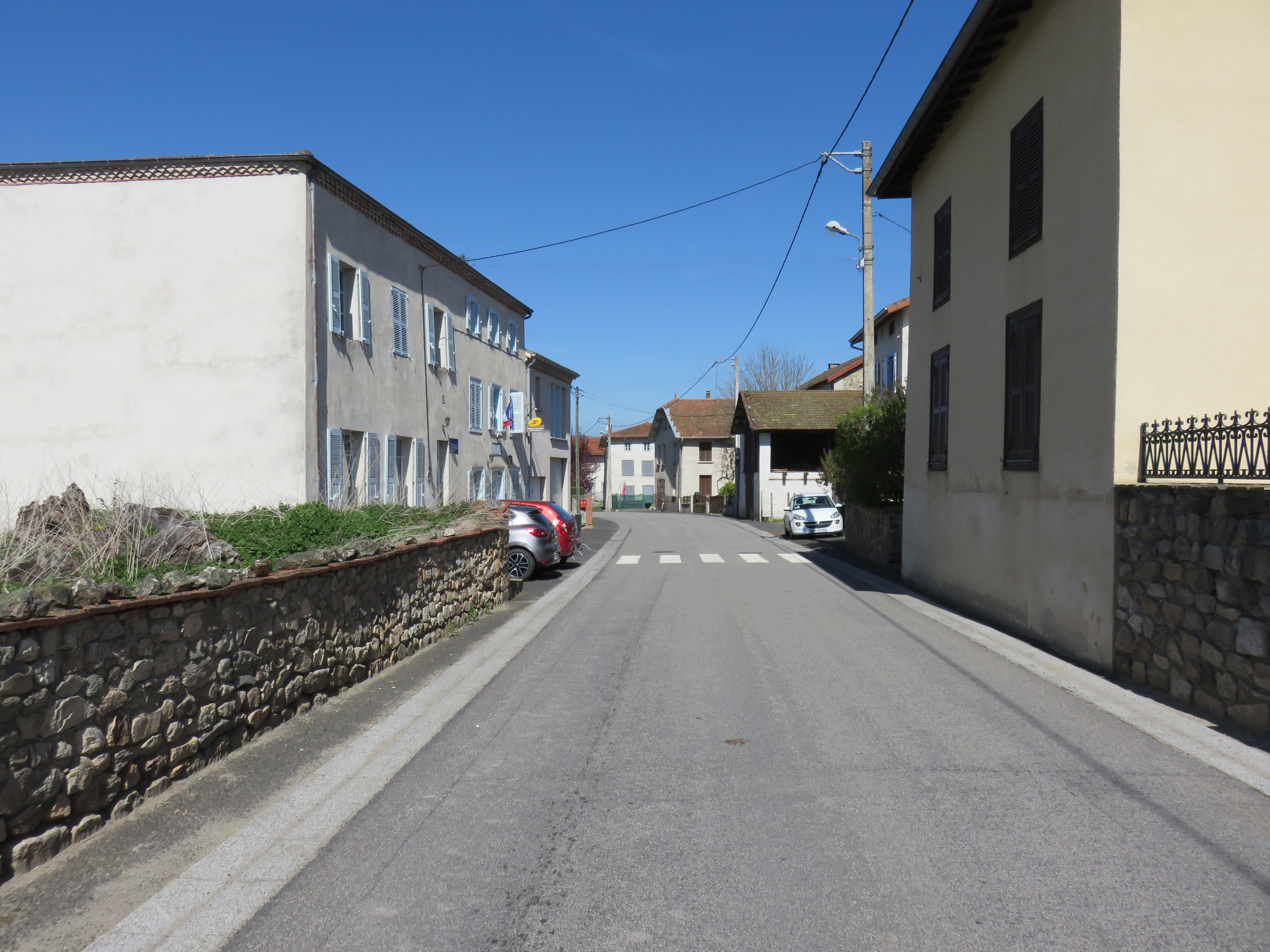
- Chaumont-le-Bourg in 2017.
- Location of Chaumont-le-Bourg
- Location within France Location within Auvergne-Rhône-Alpes
- Coordinates: 45°27′02″N 3°46′20″E
- Country: France
- Region: Auvergne-Rhône-Alpes
- Department: Puy-de-Dôme
- Arrondissement: Ambert
- Canton: Ambert
- Intercommunality: Ambert Livradois Forez

Government
  - Mayor (2026–32): Raymond Nourrisson
- Area^{1}: 8.28 km^{2} (3.20 sq mi)
- Elevation: 615 m (2,018 ft)
- Highest elevation: 860 m (2,820 ft)
- Lowest elevation: 550 m (1,800 ft)
- Population (2023): 238
  - Density: 28.7/km^{2} (74.4/sq mi)
- Time zone: UTC+01:00 (CET)
  - Summer (DST): UTC+02:00 (CEST)
- INSEE/Postal code: 63105 /63220
- ^{1} French Land Register data, which excludes lakes, ponds, glaciers > 1 km^{2} (0.386 sq mi or 247 acres) and river estuaries.

Chaumont-le-Bourg (French pronunciation: [ʃomɔ̃ lə buʁ]) is a commune in the Puy-de-Dôme department in Auvergne-Rhône-Alpes in central France.

== See also ==
- Communes of the Puy-de-Dôme department
