= Doranges =

- Commune
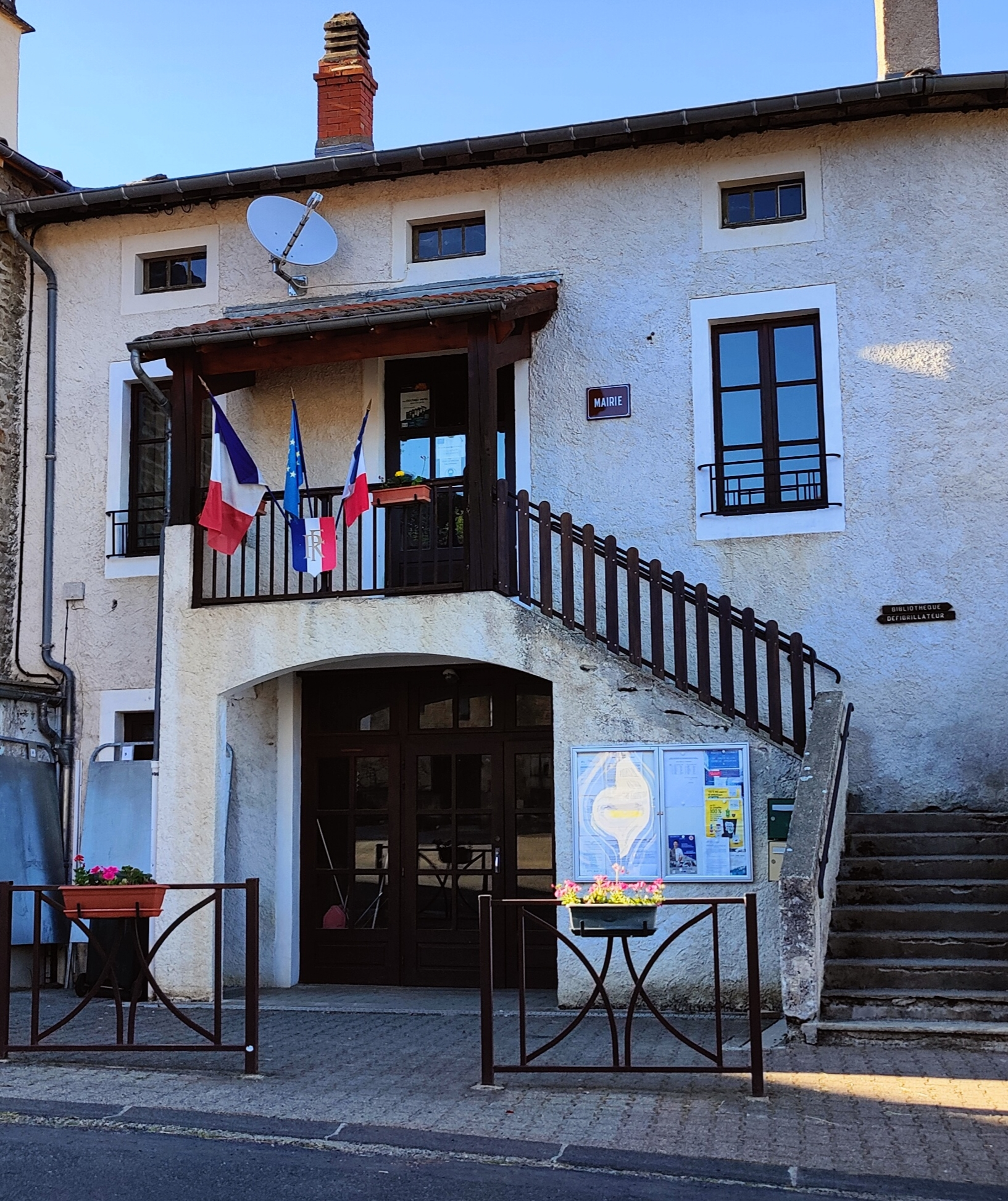
- Doranges Town hall
- Location of Doranges
- Location within France Location within Auvergne-Rhône-Alpes
- Coordinates: 45°24′28″N 3°37′00″E
- Country: France
- Region: Auvergne-Rhône-Alpes
- Department: Puy-de-Dôme
- Arrondissement: Ambert
- Canton: Ambert
- Intercommunality: Ambert Livradois Forez

Government
  - Mayor (2026–32): Bernard Pastel
- Area^{1}: 19.43 km^{2} (7.50 sq mi)
- Elevation: 950 m (3,120 ft)
- Highest elevation: 1,121 m (3,678 ft)
- Lowest elevation: 865 m (2,838 ft)
- Population (2023): 178
  - Density: 9.16/km^{2} (23.7/sq mi)
- Time zone: UTC+01:00 (CET)
  - Summer (DST): UTC+02:00 (CEST)
- INSEE/Postal code: 63137 /63220
- ^{1} French Land Register data, which excludes lakes, ponds, glaciers > 1 km^{2} (0.386 sq mi or 247 acres) and river estuaries.

Doranges (French pronunciation: [dɔʁɑ̃ʒ]) is a commune in the Puy-de-Dôme department in Auvergne-Rhône-Alpes in central France.

== See also ==
- Communes of the Puy-de-Dôme department
