= Églisolles =

- Commune
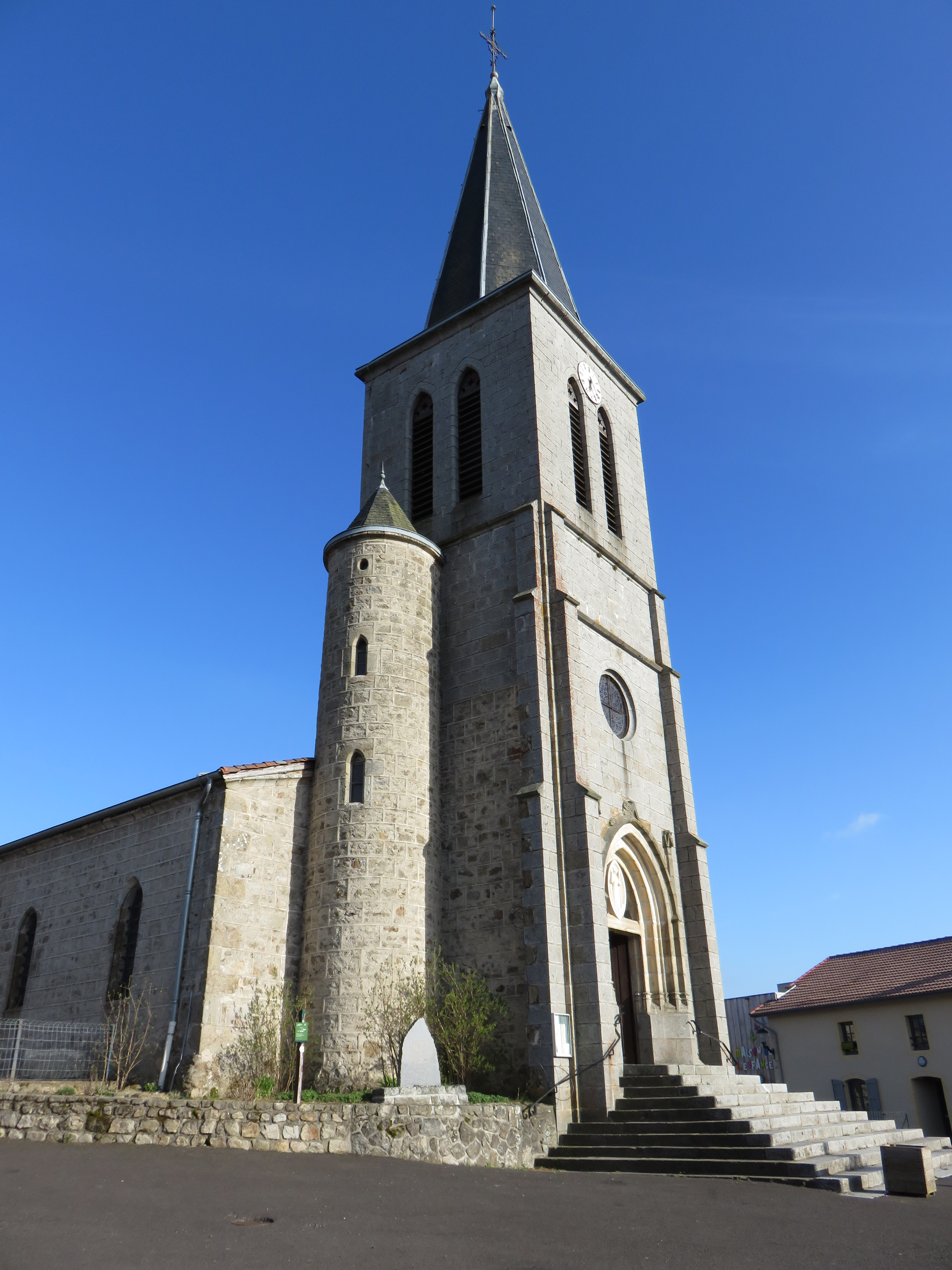
- Church of Églisolles in 2017.
- Location of Églisolles
- Location within France Location within Auvergne-Rhône-Alpes
- Coordinates: 45°27′22″N 3°53′14″E
- Country: France
- Region: Auvergne-Rhône-Alpes
- Department: Puy-de-Dôme
- Arrondissement: Ambert
- Canton: Ambert
- Intercommunality: CC Ambert Livradois Forez

Government
  - Mayor (2026–32): Jean-Luc Viallard
- Area^{1}: 20.59 km^{2} (7.95 sq mi)
- Elevation: 923 m (3,028 ft)
- Highest elevation: 1,225 m (4,019 ft)
- Lowest elevation: 846 m (2,776 ft)
- Population (2023): 308
  - Density: 15.0/km^{2} (38.7/sq mi)
- Time zone: UTC+01:00 (CET)
  - Summer (DST): UTC+02:00 (CEST)
- INSEE/Postal code: 63147 /63840
- ^{1} French Land Register data, which excludes lakes, ponds, glaciers > 1 km^{2} (0.386 sq mi or 247 acres) and river estuaries.

Églisolles (French pronunciation: [eɡlizɔl]; Occitan: Egleisòla) is a commune in the Puy-de-Dôme department in Auvergne in central France.

== See also ==
- Communes of the Puy-de-Dôme department
