= Novacelles =

- Commune
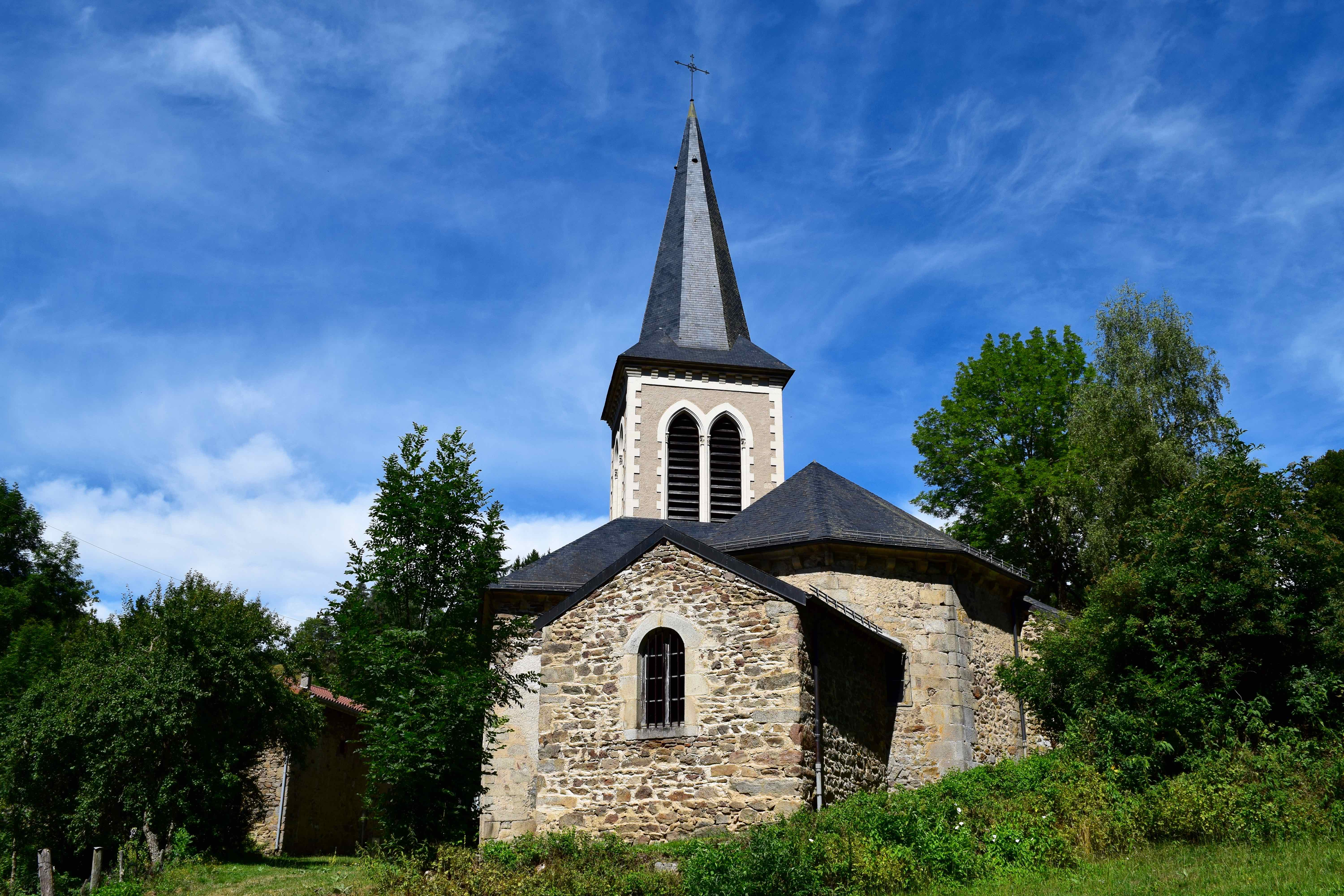
- The church in Novacelles
- Location of Novacelles
- Location within France Location within Auvergne-Rhône-Alpes
- Coordinates: 45°26′17″N 3°39′00″E
- Country: France
- Region: Auvergne-Rhône-Alpes
- Department: Puy-de-Dôme
- Arrondissement: Ambert
- Canton: Ambert

Government
  - Mayor (2020–2026): Patrick Delferrière
- Area^{1}: 14.43 km^{2} (5.57 sq mi)
- Elevation: 800 m (2,600 ft)
- Highest elevation: 995 m (3,264 ft)
- Lowest elevation: 669 m (2,195 ft)
- Population (2023): 155
  - Density: 10.7/km^{2} (27.8/sq mi)
- Time zone: UTC+01:00 (CET)
  - Summer (DST): UTC+02:00 (CEST)
- INSEE/Postal code: 63256 /63220
- ^{1} French Land Register data, which excludes lakes, ponds, glaciers > 1 km^{2} (0.386 sq mi or 247 acres) and river estuaries.

Novacelles (French pronunciation: [nɔvasɛl]; Occitan: Nòvacela) is a commune in the Puy-de-Dôme department in Auvergne in central France.

== See also ==
- Communes of the Puy-de-Dôme department
