= La Chaulme =

- Commune
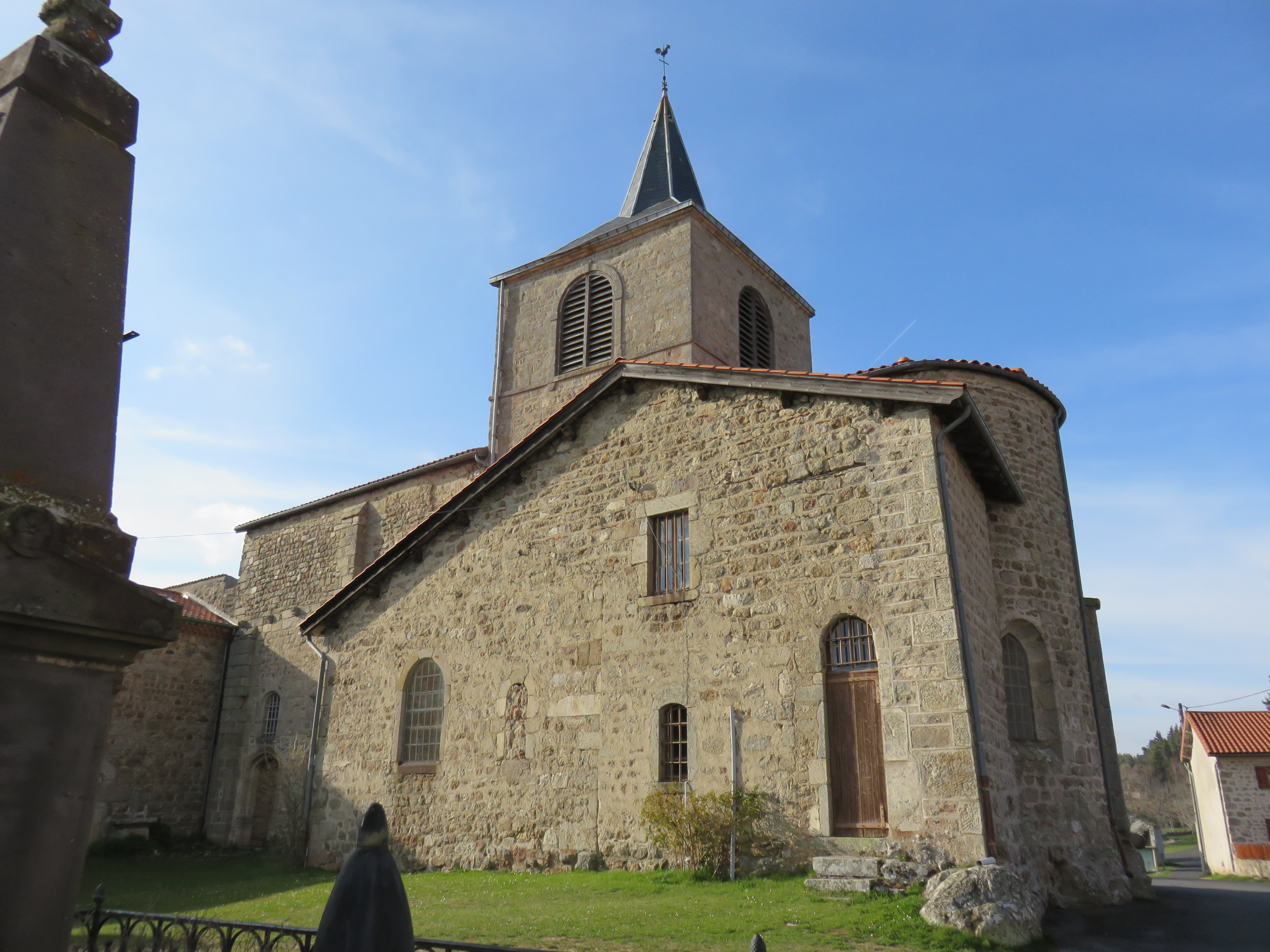
- The church in La Chaulme
- Location of La Chaulme
- Location within France Location within Auvergne-Rhône-Alpes
- Coordinates: 45°27′59″N 3°56′43″E
- Country: France
- Region: Auvergne-Rhône-Alpes
- Department: Puy-de-Dôme
- Arrondissement: Ambert
- Canton: Ambert
- Intercommunality: CC Ambert Livradois Forez

Government
  - Mayor (2026–32): Alain Faure
- Area^{1}: 13.60 km^{2} (5.25 sq mi)
- Elevation: 1,150 m (3,770 ft)
- Highest elevation: 1,280 m (4,200 ft)
- Lowest elevation: 984 m (3,228 ft)
- Population (2023): 118
  - Density: 8.68/km^{2} (22.5/sq mi)
- Time zone: UTC+01:00 (CET)
  - Summer (DST): UTC+02:00 (CEST)
- INSEE/Postal code: 63104 /63660
- ^{1} French Land Register data, which excludes lakes, ponds, glaciers > 1 km^{2} (0.386 sq mi or 247 acres) and river estuaries.

La Chaulme (French pronunciation: [la ʃolm]; Occitan: La Chauma) is a commune in the Puy-de-Dôme department in Auvergne-Rhône-Alpes in central France.

== See also ==
- Communes of the Puy-de-Dôme department
