= Saint-Martin-des-Olmes =

- Commune
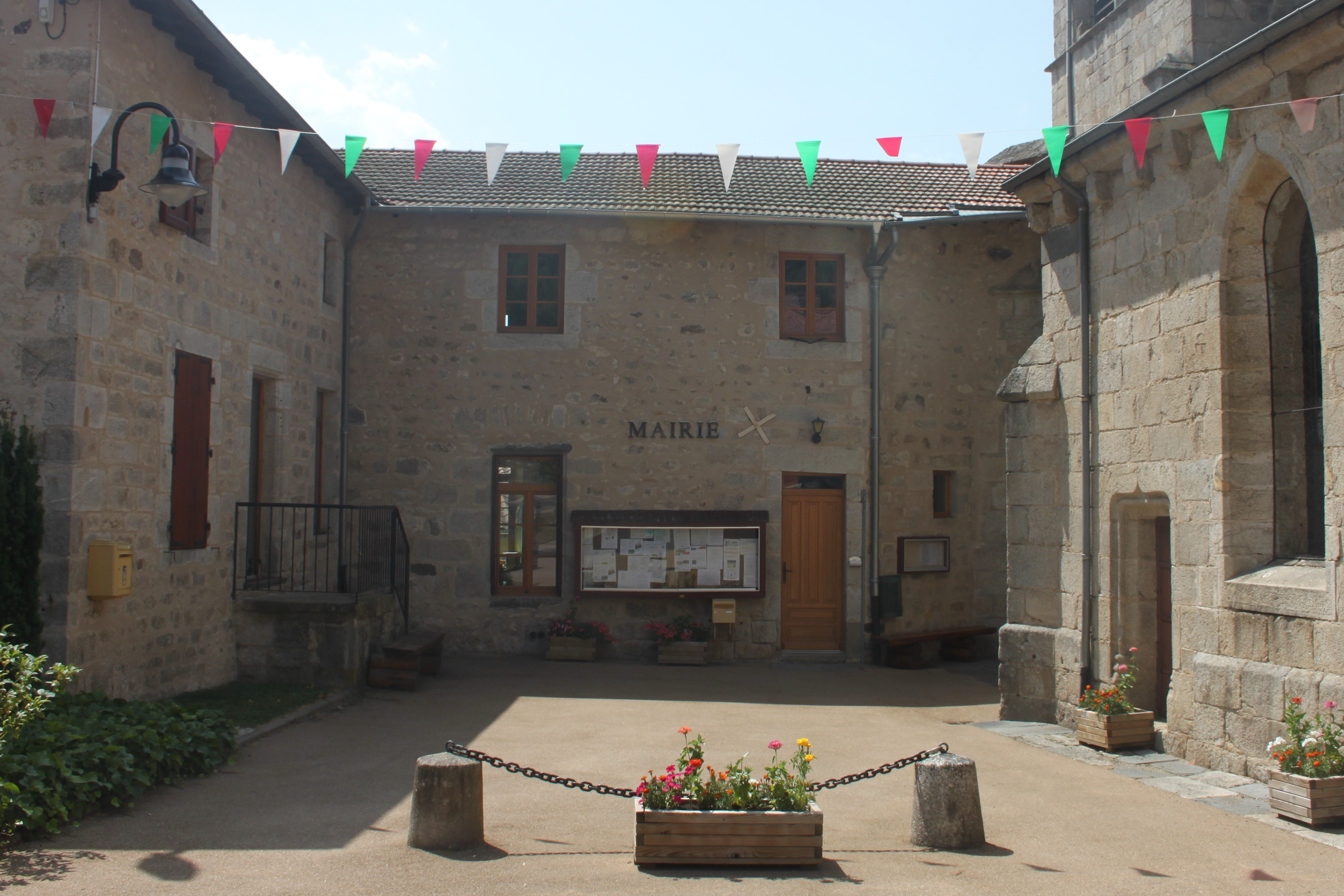
- The town hall in Saint-Martin-des-Olmes
- Location of Saint-Martin-des-Olmes
- Location within France Location within Auvergne-Rhône-Alpes
- Coordinates: 45°31′52″N 3°47′53″E
- Country: France
- Region: Auvergne-Rhône-Alpes
- Department: Puy-de-Dôme
- Arrondissement: Ambert
- Canton: Ambert
- Intercommunality: Ambert Livradois Forez

Government
  - Mayor (2020–2026): Daniel Barrier
- Area^{1}: 17.15 km^{2} (6.62 sq mi)
- Elevation: 849 m (2,785 ft)
- Highest elevation: 1,357 m (4,452 ft)
- Lowest elevation: 640 m (2,100 ft)
- Population (2023): 313
  - Density: 18.3/km^{2} (47.3/sq mi)
- Time zone: UTC+01:00 (CET)
  - Summer (DST): UTC+02:00 (CEST)
- INSEE/Postal code: 63374 /63600
- ^{1} French Land Register data, which excludes lakes, ponds, glaciers > 1 km^{2} (0.386 sq mi or 247 acres) and river estuaries.

Saint-Martin-des-Olmes (French pronunciation: [sɛ̃ maʁtɛ̃ de.z‿ɔlm]; Auvergnat: Sant Martin daus Oumes) is a commune in the Puy-de-Dôme department in Auvergne in central France.

== See also ==
- Communes of the Puy-de-Dôme department
