= Saint-Romain, Puy-de-Dôme =

Saint-Romain
- Commune
- Location of Saint-Romain
- Location within France Location within Auvergne-Rhône-Alpes
- Coordinates: 45°29′26″N 3°53′46″E
- Country: France
- Region: Auvergne-Rhône-Alpes
- Department: Puy-de-Dôme
- Arrondissement: Ambert
- Canton: Ambert
- Intercommunality: CC Ambert Livradois Forez

Government
  - Mayor (2020–2026): Bernard Batisson
- Area^{1}: 16.05 km^{2} (6.20 sq mi)
- Elevation: 920 m (3,020 ft)
- Highest elevation: 1,256 m (4,121 ft)
- Lowest elevation: 867 m (2,844 ft)
- Population (2023): 197
  - Density: 12.3/km^{2} (31.8/sq mi)
- Time zone: UTC+01:00 (CET)
  - Summer (DST): UTC+02:00 (CEST)
- INSEE/Postal code: 63394 /63660
- ^{1} French Land Register data, which excludes lakes, ponds, glaciers > 1 km^{2} (0.386 sq mi or 247 acres) and river estuaries.

Saint-Romain (French pronunciation: [sɛ̃ ʁɔmɛ̃]; Auvergnat: Sant Roman) is a commune in the Puy-de-Dôme department in Auvergne in central France.

== See also ==
- Communes of the Puy-de-Dôme department
