= Mayres, Puy-de-Dôme =

Commune in Auvergne-Rhône-Alpes, France

Mayres
- Commune
- Location of Mayres
- Location within France Location within Auvergne-Rhône-Alpes
- Coordinates: 45°23′21″N 3°41′45″E
- Country: France
- Region: Auvergne-Rhône-Alpes
- Department: Puy-de-Dôme
- Arrondissement: Ambert
- Canton: Ambert
- Intercommunality: Ambert Livradois Forez

Government
  - Mayor (2026–32): Stéphane Bonnet
- Area^{1}: 12.49 km^{2} (4.82 sq mi)
- Elevation: 750 m (2,460 ft)
- Highest elevation: 926 m (3,038 ft)
- Lowest elevation: 608 m (1,995 ft)
- Population (2023): 197
  - Density: 15.8/km^{2} (40.9/sq mi)
- Time zone: UTC+01:00 (CET)
  - Summer (DST): UTC+02:00 (CEST)
- INSEE/Postal code: 63218 /63220
- ^{1} French Land Register data, which excludes lakes, ponds, glaciers > 1 km^{2} (0.386 sq mi or 247 acres) and river estuaries.

Mayres (French pronunciation: [mɛʁ]) is a commune in the Puy-de-Dôme department in Auvergne in central France.

== See also ==
- Communes of the Puy-de-Dôme department
