= Dore-l'Église =

- Commune
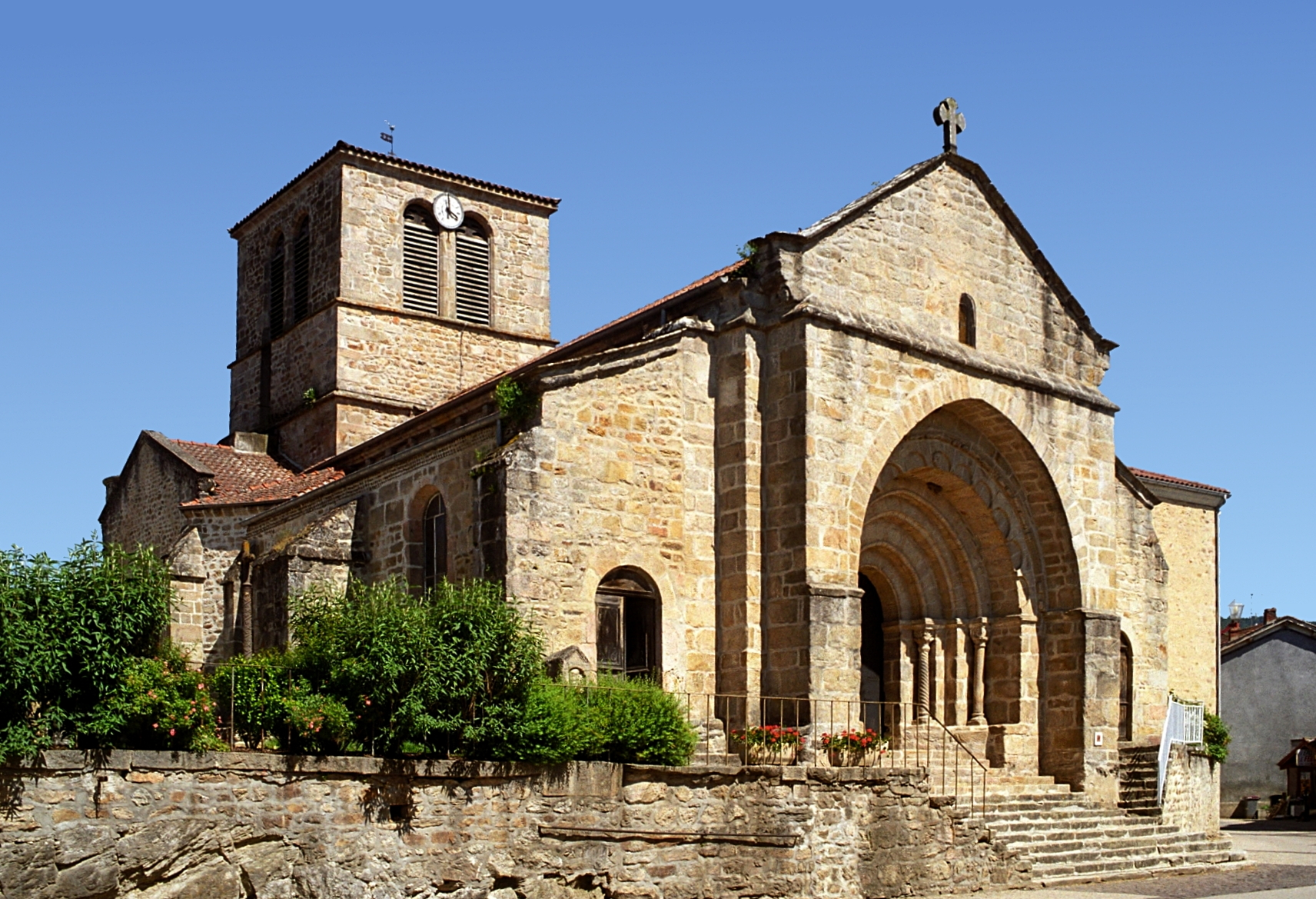
- The church in Dore-l'Église
- Location of Dore-l'Église
- Location within France Location within Auvergne-Rhône-Alpes
- Coordinates: 45°23′02″N 3°45′06″E
- Country: France
- Region: Auvergne-Rhône-Alpes
- Department: Puy-de-Dôme
- Arrondissement: Ambert
- Canton: Ambert
- Intercommunality: Ambert Livradois Forez

Government
  - Mayor (2020–2026): Jean-Claude Daurat
- Area^{1}: 27.14 km^{2} (10.48 sq mi)
- Elevation: 600 m (2,000 ft)
- Highest elevation: 1,027 m (3,369 ft)
- Lowest elevation: 578 m (1,896 ft)
- Population (2023): 656
  - Density: 24.2/km^{2} (62.6/sq mi)
- Time zone: UTC+01:00 (CET)
  - Summer (DST): UTC+02:00 (CEST)
- INSEE/Postal code: 63139 /63220
- ^{1} French Land Register data, which excludes lakes, ponds, glaciers > 1 km^{2} (0.386 sq mi or 247 acres) and river estuaries.

Dore-l'Église (French pronunciation: [dɔʁ leɡliz]; Occitan: Dòra la Gleisa) is a commune in the Puy-de-Dôme department in Auvergne-Rhône-Alpes in central France.

== See also ==
- Communes of the Puy-de-Dôme department
