= Medeyrolles =

- Commune
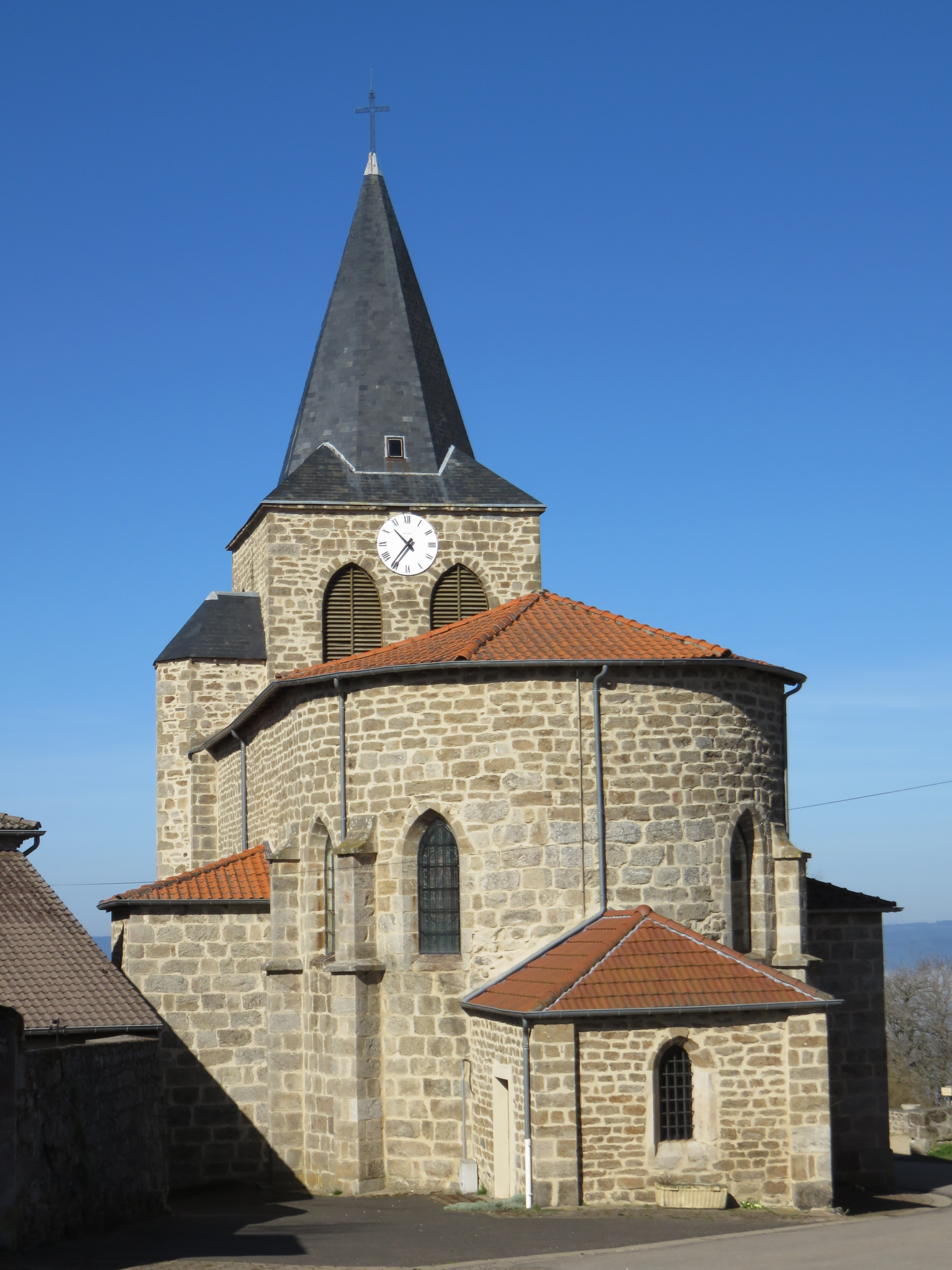
- Church of Medeyrolles.
- Location of Medeyrolles
- Location within France Location within Auvergne-Rhône-Alpes
- Coordinates: 45°24′21″N 3°48′15″E
- Country: France
- Region: Auvergne-Rhône-Alpes
- Department: Puy-de-Dôme
- Arrondissement: Ambert
- Canton: Ambert
- Intercommunality: CC Ambert Livradois Forez

Government
  - Mayor (2020–2026): Michel Bravard
- Area^{1}: 17.12 km^{2} (6.61 sq mi)
- Elevation: 1,000 m (3,300 ft)
- Highest elevation: 1,191 m (3,907 ft)
- Lowest elevation: 755 m (2,477 ft)
- Population (2023): 113
  - Density: 6.60/km^{2} (17.1/sq mi)
- Time zone: UTC+01:00 (CET)
  - Summer (DST): UTC+02:00 (CEST)
- INSEE/Postal code: 63221 /63220
- ^{1} French Land Register data, which excludes lakes, ponds, glaciers > 1 km^{2} (0.386 sq mi or 247 acres) and river estuaries.

Medeyrolles (French pronunciation: [mədeʁɔl]; Occitan: Medeiròla) is a commune in the Puy-de-Dôme department in Auvergne in central France.

== See also ==
- Communes of the Puy-de-Dôme department
