= Grandrif =

- Commune
- Coat of arms
- Location of Grandrif
- Location within France Location within Auvergne-Rhône-Alpes
- Coordinates: 45°30′20″N 3°49′05″E
- Country: France
- Region: Auvergne-Rhône-Alpes
- Department: Puy-de-Dôme
- Arrondissement: Ambert
- Canton: Ambert
- Intercommunality: CC Ambert Livradois Forez

Government
  - Mayor (2020–2026): Suzanne Labary
- Area^{1}: 22.15 km^{2} (8.55 sq mi)
- Elevation: 800 m (2,600 ft)
- Population (2023): 199
  - Density: 8.98/km^{2} (23.3/sq mi)
- Time zone: UTC+01:00 (CET)
  - Summer (DST): UTC+02:00 (CEST)
- INSEE/Postal code: 63173 /63600
- ^{1} French Land Register data, which excludes lakes, ponds, glaciers > 1 km^{2} (0.386 sq mi or 247 acres) and river estuaries.

Grandrif (French pronunciation: [ɡʁɑ̃ʁif]) is a commune in the Puy-de-Dôme department in Auvergne in central France.

== See also ==
- Communes of the Puy-de-Dôme department
