= Beurières =

- Commune
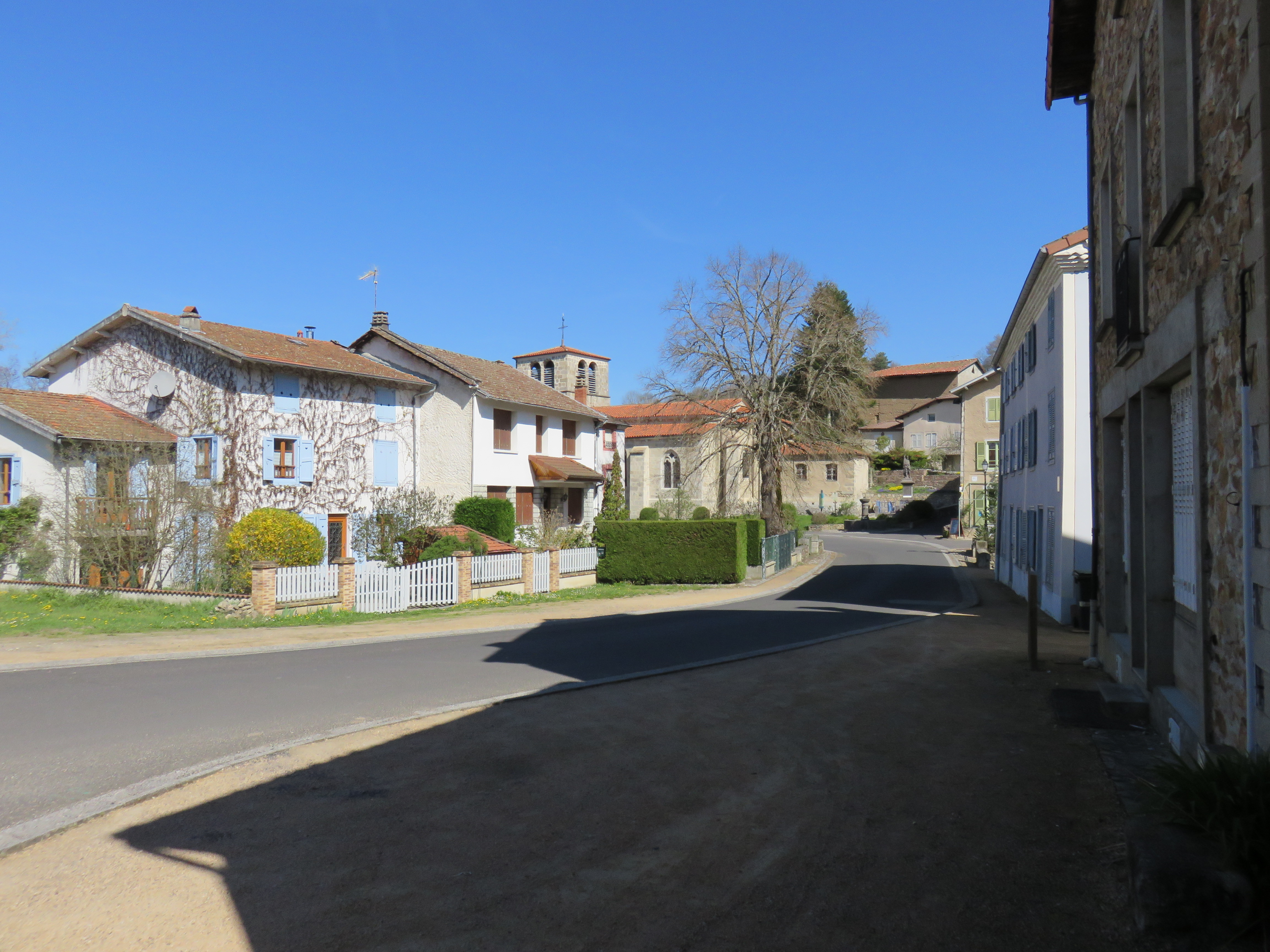
- Beurières in 2017

- Coat of arms
- Location of Beurières
- Location within France Location within Auvergne-Rhône-Alpes
- Coordinates: 45°26′25″N 3°46′31″E
- Country: France
- Region: Auvergne-Rhône-Alpes
- Department: Puy-de-Dôme
- Arrondissement: Ambert
- Canton: Ambert

Government
  - Mayor (2026–32): Laurence Finand George
- Area^{1}: 16.27 km^{2} (6.28 sq mi)
- Elevation: 600 m (2,000 ft)
- Highest elevation: 1,033 m (3,389 ft)
- Lowest elevation: 557 m (1,827 ft)
- Population (2023): 322
  - Density: 19.8/km^{2} (51.3/sq mi)
- Time zone: UTC+01:00 (CET)
  - Summer (DST): UTC+02:00 (CEST)
- INSEE/Postal code: 63039 /63220
- ^{1} French Land Register data, which excludes lakes, ponds, glaciers > 1 km^{2} (0.386 sq mi or 247 acres) and river estuaries.

Beurières (French pronunciation: [bœʁjɛʁ]) is a commune in the Puy-de-Dôme department in Auvergne-Rhône-Alpes in central France.

== Population ==
Historical population
Year	Pop.	±% p.a.
1968	342	—
1975	328	−0.60%
1982	287	−1.89%
1990	336	+1.99%
1999	344	+0.26%
2007	310	−1.29%
2012	305	−0.32%
2017	297	−0.53%
2023	322	+1.36%
Source: INSEE

== See also ==
- Communes of the Puy-de-Dôme department
