= Ambert =

- Subprefecture and commune
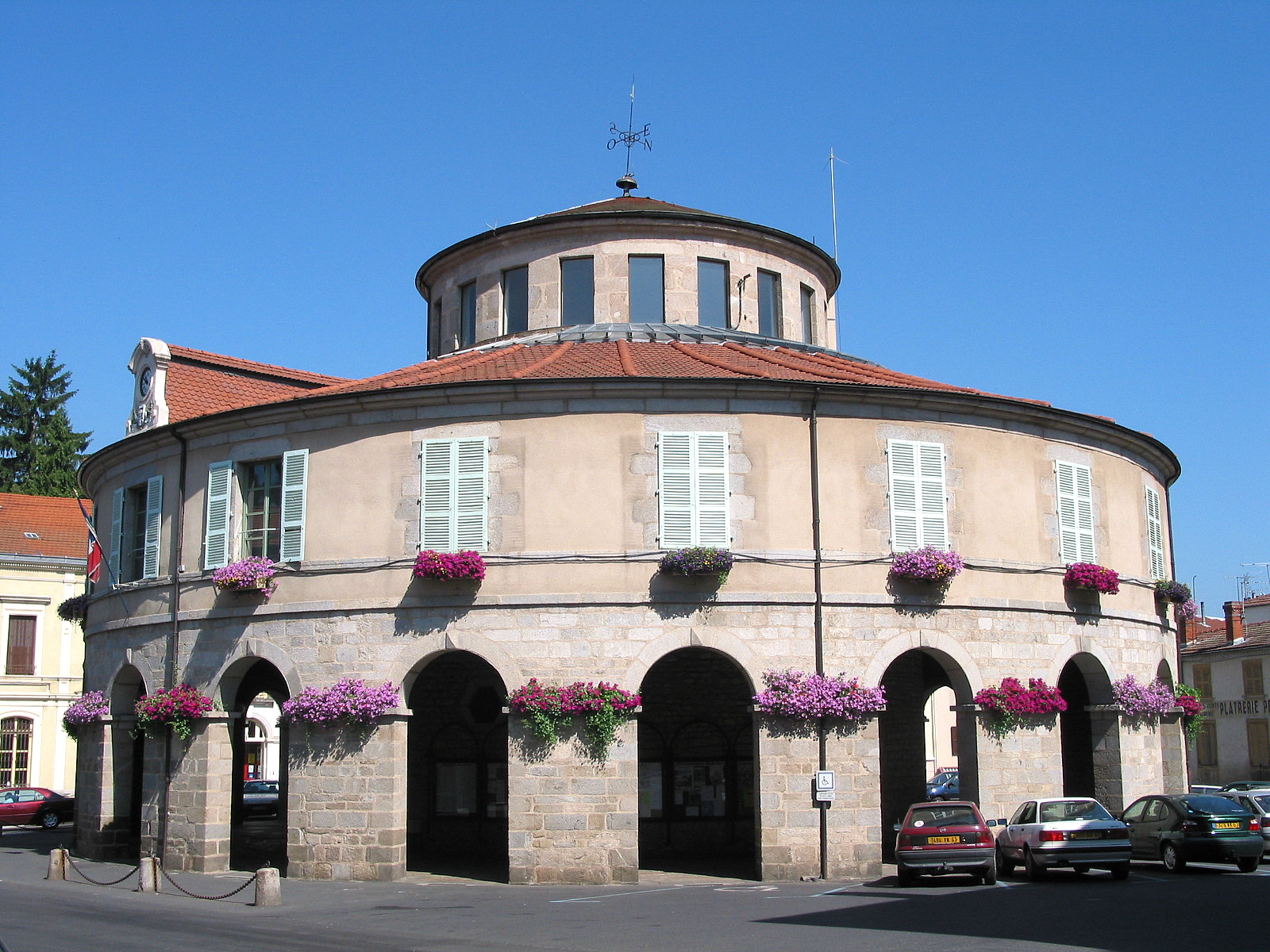
- Town hall (originally the grain market)

- Coat of arms
- Location of Ambert
- Location within France Location within Auvergne-Rhône-Alpes
- Coordinates: 45°33′01″N 3°44′33″E
- Country: France
- Region: Auvergne-Rhône-Alpes
- Department: Puy-de-Dôme
- Arrondissement: Ambert
- Canton: Ambert
- Intercommunality: Ambert Livradois Forez

Government
  - Mayor (2026–32): Didier Doré
- Area^{1}: 60.48 km^{2} (23.35 sq mi)
- Elevation: 527 m (1,729 ft)
- Highest elevation: 1,365 m (4,478 ft)
- Lowest elevation: 514 m (1,686 ft)
- Population (2023): 6,517
  - Density: 107.8/km^{2} (279.1/sq mi)
- Time zone: UTC+01:00 (CET)
  - Summer (DST): UTC+02:00 (CEST)
- INSEE/Postal code: 63003 /63600
- ^{1} French Land Register data, which excludes lakes, ponds, glaciers > 1 km^{2} (0.386 sq mi or 247 acres) and river estuaries.

Ambert (French pronunciation: [ɑ̃bɛʁ]; Auvergnat: Embèrt) is a commune in the Puy-de-Dôme department in Auvergne in central France.

== Administration ==
Ambert is the seat of the canton of Ambert and the arrondissement of Ambert. It is a sub-prefecture of the department. The arrondissement consists of eight cantons (before March 2015).

== Geography ==
Ambert is located in the southeast of the Puy-de-Dôme department, in the Auvergne-Rhône-Alpes region.

The commune lies on the river Dore, a tributary of the Allier.

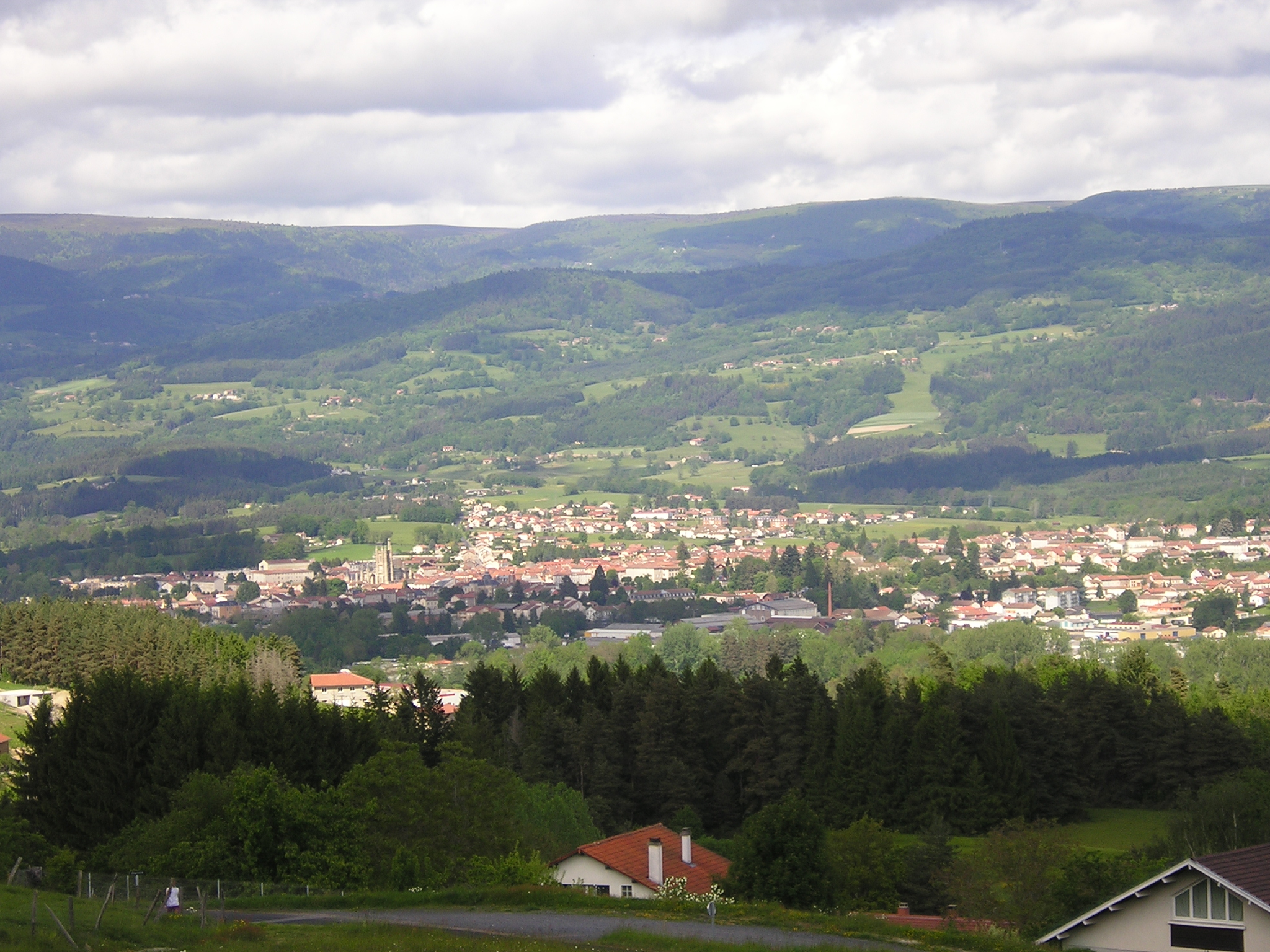
General view

== Population ==
Historical population
Year	Pop.	±% p.a.
1968	7,328	—
1975	7,603	+0.53%
1982	7,722	+0.22%
1990	7,420	−0.50%
1999	7,309	−0.17%
2007	7,016	−0.51%
2012	6,852	−0.47%
2017	6,671	−0.53%
2023	6,517	−0.39%
Source: INSEE

== Sights ==
Ambert is famous for its fourme d'Ambert cheese - "Fourme d'Ambert", its paper mills - "Le moulin Richard de Bas" - (the first edition of Diderot's Encyclopédie was printed on paper made in Ambert) and its circular town market hall - "La Mairie" - (popularized by Jules Romains in his novel Les copains).

The Agrivap Chemin de Fer Touristique operates out of Ambert. There is a steam engine that makes a local run, but to see the line in full a ride on the Panoramique Autorail is not to be missed.

There is an industrial museum with an interesting collection of tractors and small steam engines.

In the town the Museum of Cheese is worth a visit, as is the old paper mill a few kilometres outside the main town.

== Personalities ==
Ambert was the birthplace of the mathematician Michel Rolle (1652–1719), composer Emmanuel Chabrier (1841–1894), and anthropologist Henri Pourrat (1887–1959), who collected the oral traditions of the Auvergne. It is also the birthplace of actor and director Pierre-Loup Rajot (1958–).

== International relations ==
Ambert is twinned with:

- Annweiler, Germany, since 1988
- Higashichichibu, Saitama, Japan, since 1989
- Gorgonzola, Italy, since 2002. Both cities, known for their blue cow's-milk cheeses (cheese and Fourme d'Ambert), have almost the same latitude: 45° 32' N for Gorgonzola, 45° 33' N for Ambert.

== Touristic places near Ambert ==
Some semi-famous places to go when visiting Ambert, France are:

- La Mairie (a round town hall, fun when the farmer's market is there)
- Le Moulin Richard-de-Bas (a paper mill, with a great tour for all ages, workshops, activities and a nice little garden)

== Climate ==
Climate data for Ambert, elevation 555 m (1,821 ft), (1993–2020 normals, extremes 1993–present)
Month	Jan	Feb	Mar	Apr	May	Jun	Jul	Aug	Sep	Oct	Nov	Dec	Year
Record high °C (°F)	20.3 (68.5)	23.1 (73.6)	27.2 (81.0)	28.6 (83.5)	32.6 (90.7)	39.6 (103.3)	38.5 (101.3)	39.9 (103.8)	35.9 (96.6)	32.2 (90.0)	25.0 (77.0)	17.7 (63.9)	39.9 (103.8)
Mean daily maximum °C (°F)	6.5 (43.7)	8.1 (46.6)	12.3 (54.1)	15.4 (59.7)	19.4 (66.9)	23.7 (74.7)	26.0 (78.8)	25.8 (78.4)	21.2 (70.2)	16.8 (62.2)	10.5 (50.9)	7.1 (44.8)	16.1 (61.0)
Daily mean °C (°F)	2.3 (36.1)	3.1 (37.6)	6.1 (43.0)	8.9 (48.0)	12.8 (55.0)	16.6 (61.9)	18.6 (65.5)	18.2 (64.8)	14.3 (57.7)	11.1 (52.0)	6.0 (42.8)	3.0 (37.4)	10.1 (50.2)
Mean daily minimum °C (°F)	−1.9 (28.6)	−1.9 (28.6)	−0.1 (31.8)	2.5 (36.5)	6.3 (43.3)	9.6 (49.3)	11.2 (52.2)	10.7 (51.3)	7.4 (45.3)	5.3 (41.5)	1.4 (34.5)	−1.2 (29.8)	4.1 (39.4)
Record low °C (°F)	−17.4 (0.7)	−21.0 (−5.8)	−22.1 (−7.8)	−9.0 (15.8)	−3.8 (25.2)	−0.7 (30.7)	1.5 (34.7)	−0.2 (31.6)	−2.5 (27.5)	−10.0 (14.0)	−13.2 (8.2)	−19.8 (−3.6)	−22.1 (−7.8)
Average precipitation mm (inches)	58.7 (2.31)	47.5 (1.87)	47.2 (1.86)	65.1 (2.56)	90.3 (3.56)	78.6 (3.09)	89.7 (3.53)	86.9 (3.42)	80.6 (3.17)	76.8 (3.02)	80.5 (3.17)	58.3 (2.30)	860.2 (33.87)
Average precipitation days (≥ 1.0 mm)	10.7	10.0	8.9	10.3	11.2	8.6	9.4	9.2	8.9	10.0	10.8	11.3	119.1
Source: Meteociel

== See also ==
- Communes of the Puy-de-Dôme department
