= Saint-Ferréol-des-Côtes =

- Commune
- Location of Saint-Ferréol-des-Côtes
- Location within France Location within Auvergne-Rhône-Alpes
- Coordinates: 45°31′44″N 3°42′29″E
- Country: France
- Region: Auvergne-Rhône-Alpes
- Department: Puy-de-Dôme
- Arrondissement: Ambert
- Canton: Ambert

Government
  - Mayor (2026–32): Daniel Forestier
- Area^{1}: 15.03 km^{2} (5.80 sq mi)
- Elevation: 760 m (2,490 ft)
- Highest elevation: 1,110 m (3,640 ft)
- Lowest elevation: 526 m (1,726 ft)
- Population (2023): 548
  - Density: 36.5/km^{2} (94.4/sq mi)
- Time zone: UTC+01:00 (CET)
  - Summer (DST): UTC+02:00 (CEST)
- INSEE/Postal code: 63341 /63600
- ^{1} French Land Register data, which excludes lakes, ponds, glaciers > 1 km^{2} (0.386 sq mi or 247 acres) and river estuaries.

Saint-Ferréol-des-Côtes (French pronunciation: [sɛ̃ fɛʁeɔl de kot]; Auvergnat: Sent Ferriòu) is a commune in the Puy-de-Dôme department in Auvergne in central France.

== See also ==
- Communes of the Puy-de-Dôme department
