= Canton of Ambert =

Coordinates: 45.55°N 3.74°E

The canton of Ambert is an administrative division of the Puy-de-Dôme department, central France. Its borders were modified at the French canton reorganisation which came into effect in March 2015. Its seat is in Ambert.

It consists of the following communes:

1. Ambert
2. Arlanc
3. Baffie
4. Beurières
5. Champétières
6. La Chaulme
7. Chaumont-le-Bourg
8. Doranges
9. Dore-l'Église
10. Églisolles
11. La Forie
12. Grandrif
13. Job
14. Mayres
15. Marsac-en-Livradois
16. Medeyrolles
17. Novacelles
18. Saillant
19. Saint-Anthème
20. Saint-Alyre-d'Arlanc
21. Saint-Clément-de-Valorgue
22. Saint-Ferréol-des-Côtes
23. Saint-Just
24. Saint-Martin-des-Olmes
25. Saint-Romain
26. Sauvessanges
27. Saint-Sauveur-la-Sagne
28. Thiolières
29. Valcivières
30. Viverols
