= Viverols =

- Commune
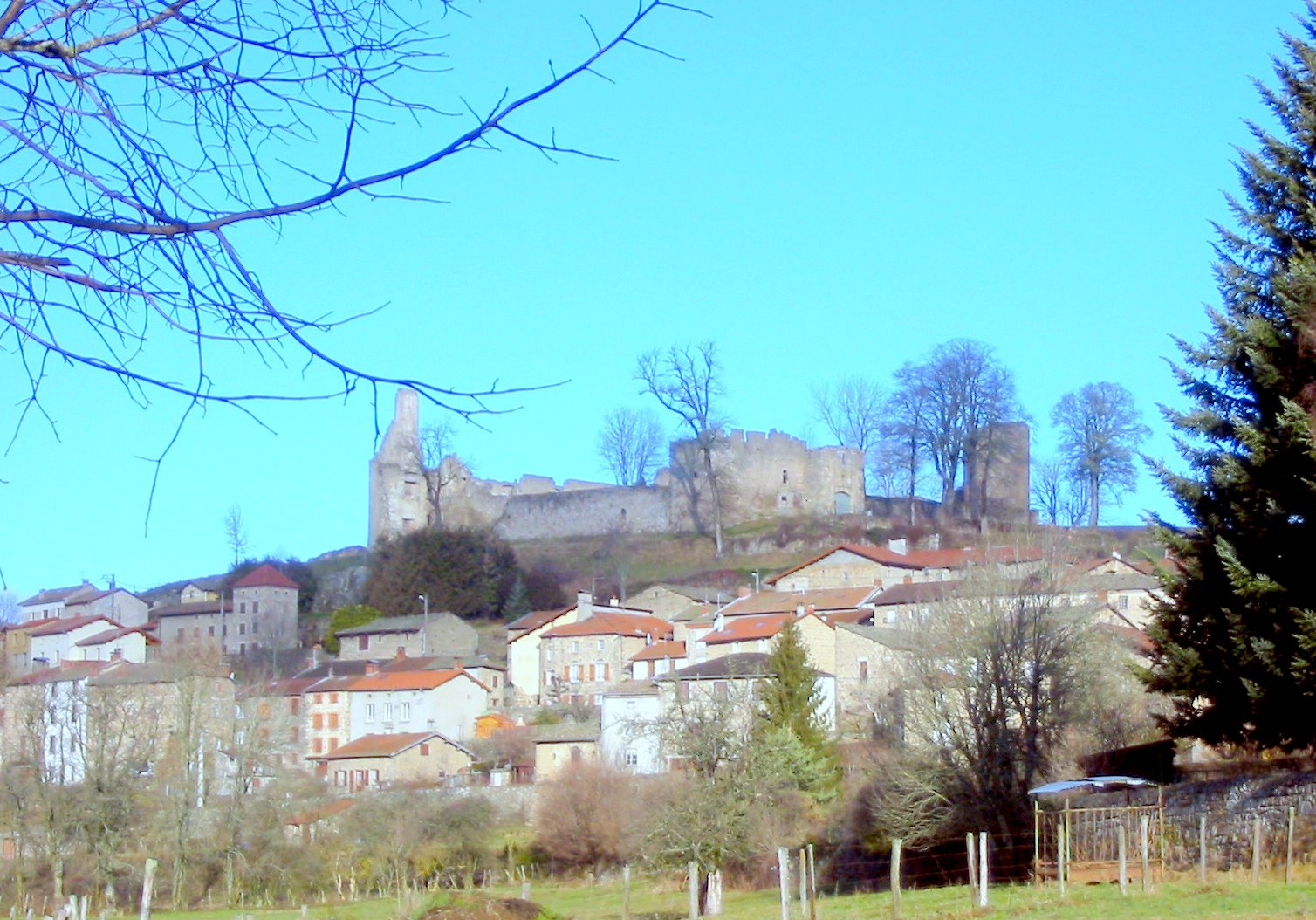
- A general view of Viverols

- Coat of arms
- Location of Viverols
- Location within France Location within Auvergne-Rhône-Alpes
- Coordinates: 45°26′02″N 3°53′02″E
- Country: France
- Region: Auvergne-Rhône-Alpes
- Department: Puy-de-Dôme
- Arrondissement: Ambert
- Canton: Ambert
- Intercommunality: Ambert Livradois Forez

Government
  - Mayor (2020–2026): Marc Joubert
- Area^{1}: 12.50 km^{2} (4.83 sq mi)
- Elevation: 874 m (2,867 ft)
- Highest elevation: 1,146 m (3,760 ft)
- Lowest elevation: 817 m (2,680 ft)
- Population (2023): 442
  - Density: 35.4/km^{2} (91.6/sq mi)
- Time zone: UTC+01:00 (CET)
  - Summer (DST): UTC+02:00 (CEST)
- INSEE/Postal code: 63465 /63840
- ^{1} French Land Register data, which excludes lakes, ponds, glaciers > 1 km^{2} (0.386 sq mi or 247 acres) and river estuaries.

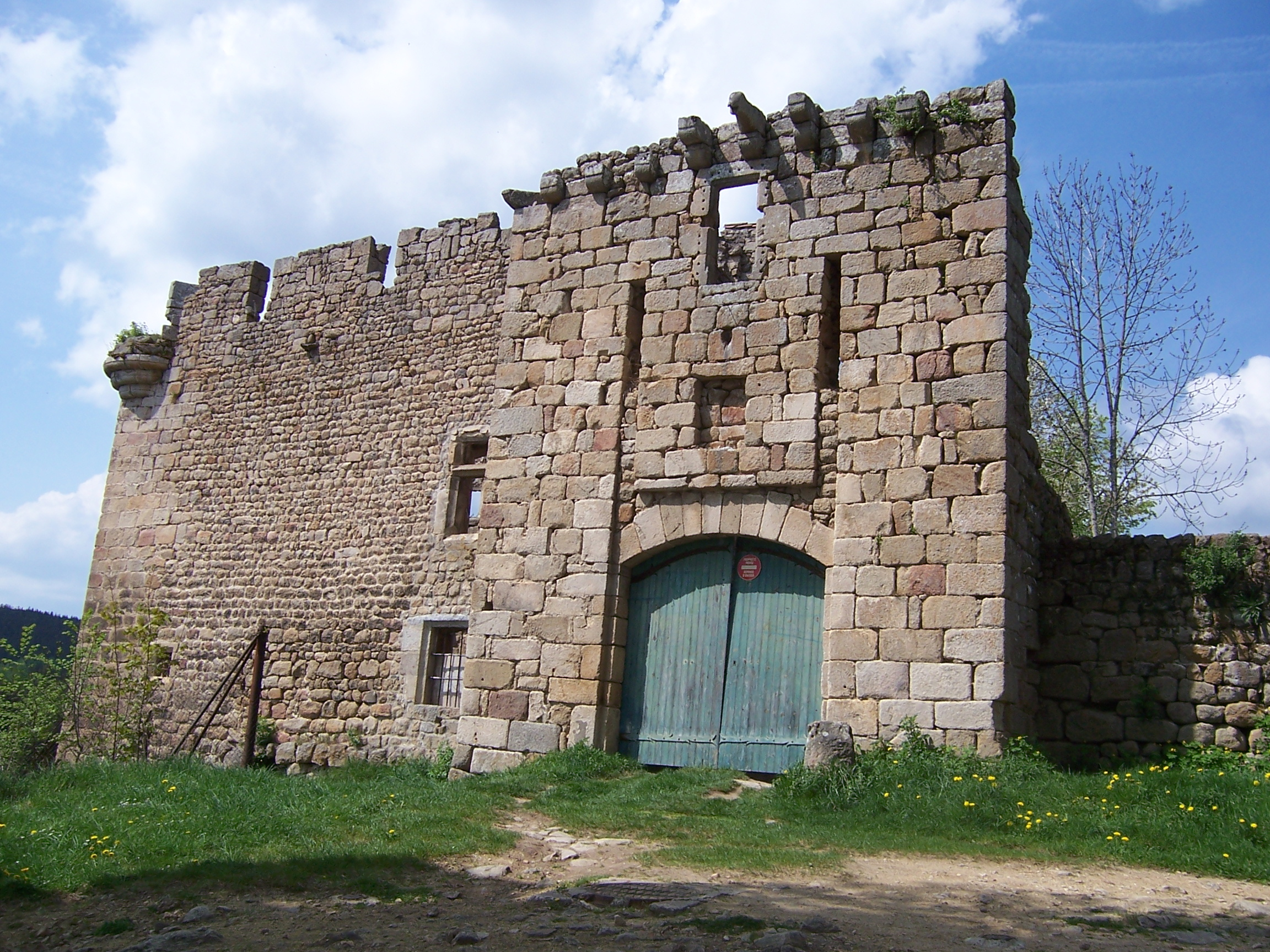
Entrance of the chateau

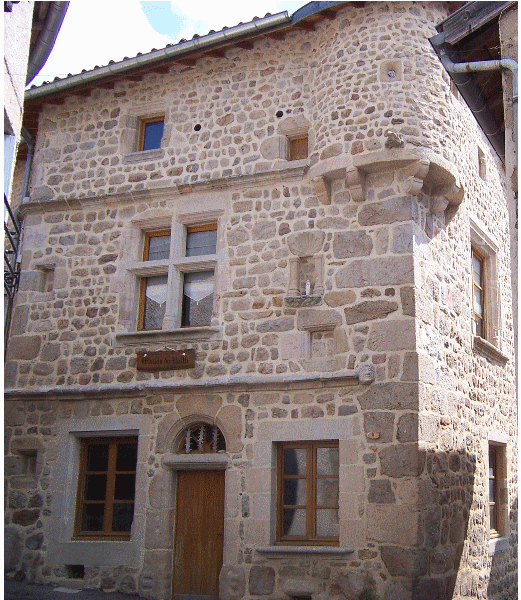
Centre of the village

Viverols (French pronunciation: [vivʁɔl]; Occitan: Veiròl) is a commune in the Puy-de-Dôme department in Auvergne-Rhône-Alpes in central France.

== See also ==
- Communes of the Puy-de-Dôme department
