= Arlanc =

- Commune
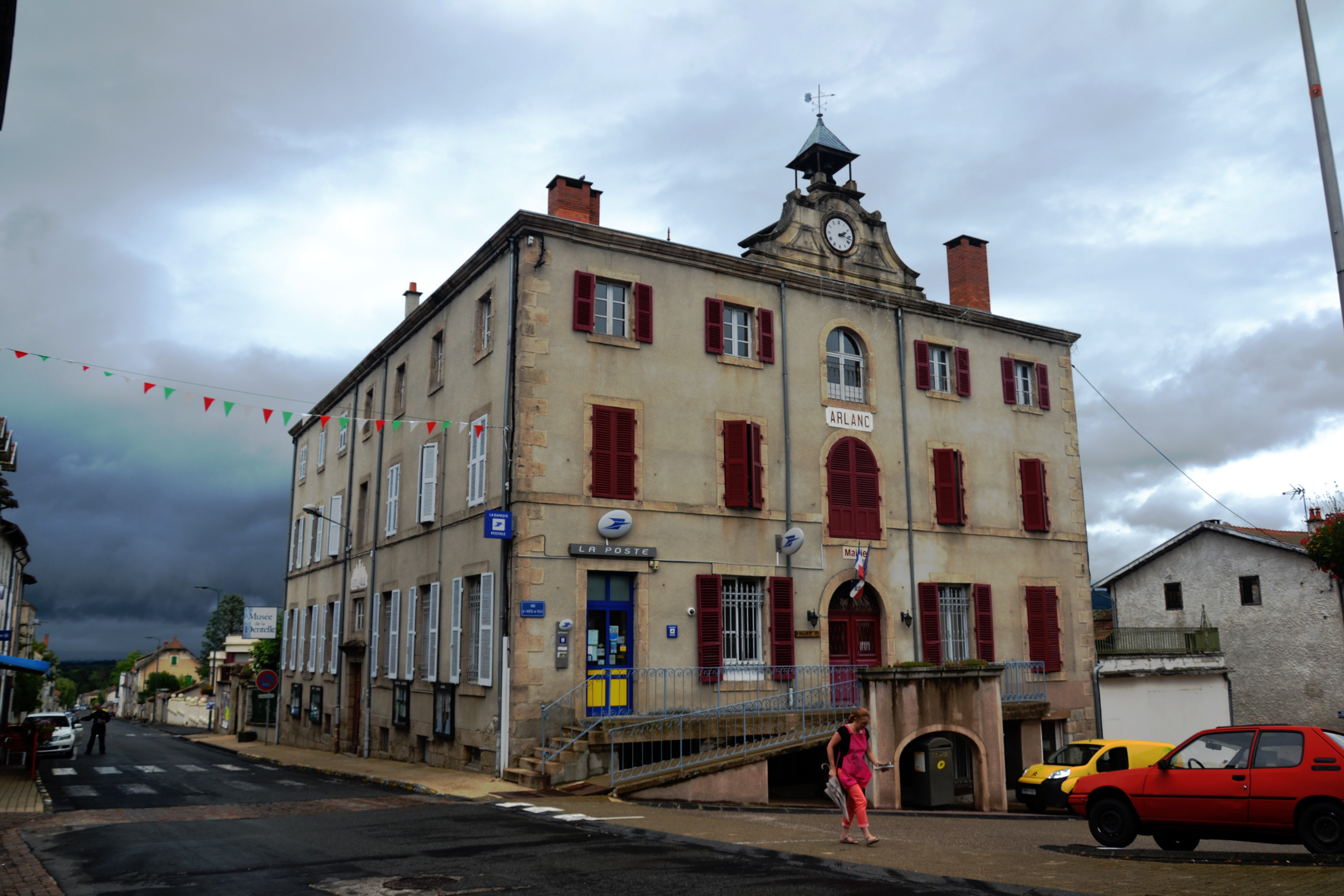
- The town hall in Arlanc

- Coat of arms
- Location of Arlanc
- Location within France Location within Auvergne-Rhône-Alpes
- Coordinates: 45°24′50″N 3°43′31″E
- Country: France
- Region: Auvergne-Rhône-Alpes
- Department: Puy-de-Dôme
- Arrondissement: Ambert
- Canton: Ambert
- Intercommunality: CC Ambert Livradois Forez

Government
  - Mayor (2026–32): Christophe Delayre
- Area^{1}: 32.19 km^{2} (12.43 sq mi)
- Elevation: 600 m (2,000 ft)
- Highest elevation: 943 m (3,094 ft)
- Lowest elevation: 547 m (1,795 ft)
- Population (2023): 1,785
  - Density: 55.45/km^{2} (143.6/sq mi)
- Time zone: UTC+01:00 (CET)
  - Summer (DST): UTC+02:00 (CEST)
- INSEE/Postal code: 63010 /63220
- ^{1} French Land Register data, which excludes lakes, ponds, glaciers > 1 km^{2} (0.386 sq mi or 247 acres) and river estuaries.

Arlanc (French pronunciation: [aʁlɑ̃]; Occitan: Arlanc) is a commune in the Puy-de-Dôme department in Auvergne-Rhône-Alpes in central France.

== Population ==
Historical population

Year	Pop.	±% p.a.
1876	3,698	—
1962	2,396	−0.50%
1968	2,348	−0.34%
1975	2,393	+0.27%
1982	2,280	−0.69%
1990	2,085	−1.11%

Year	Pop.	±% p.a.
1999	2,019	−0.36%
2007	1,890	−0.82%
2012	1,924	+0.36%
2017	1,892	−0.33%
2023	1,785	−0.97%

Source: EHESS and INSEE

== See also ==
- Communes of the Puy-de-Dôme department
