= Saillant =

- Commune
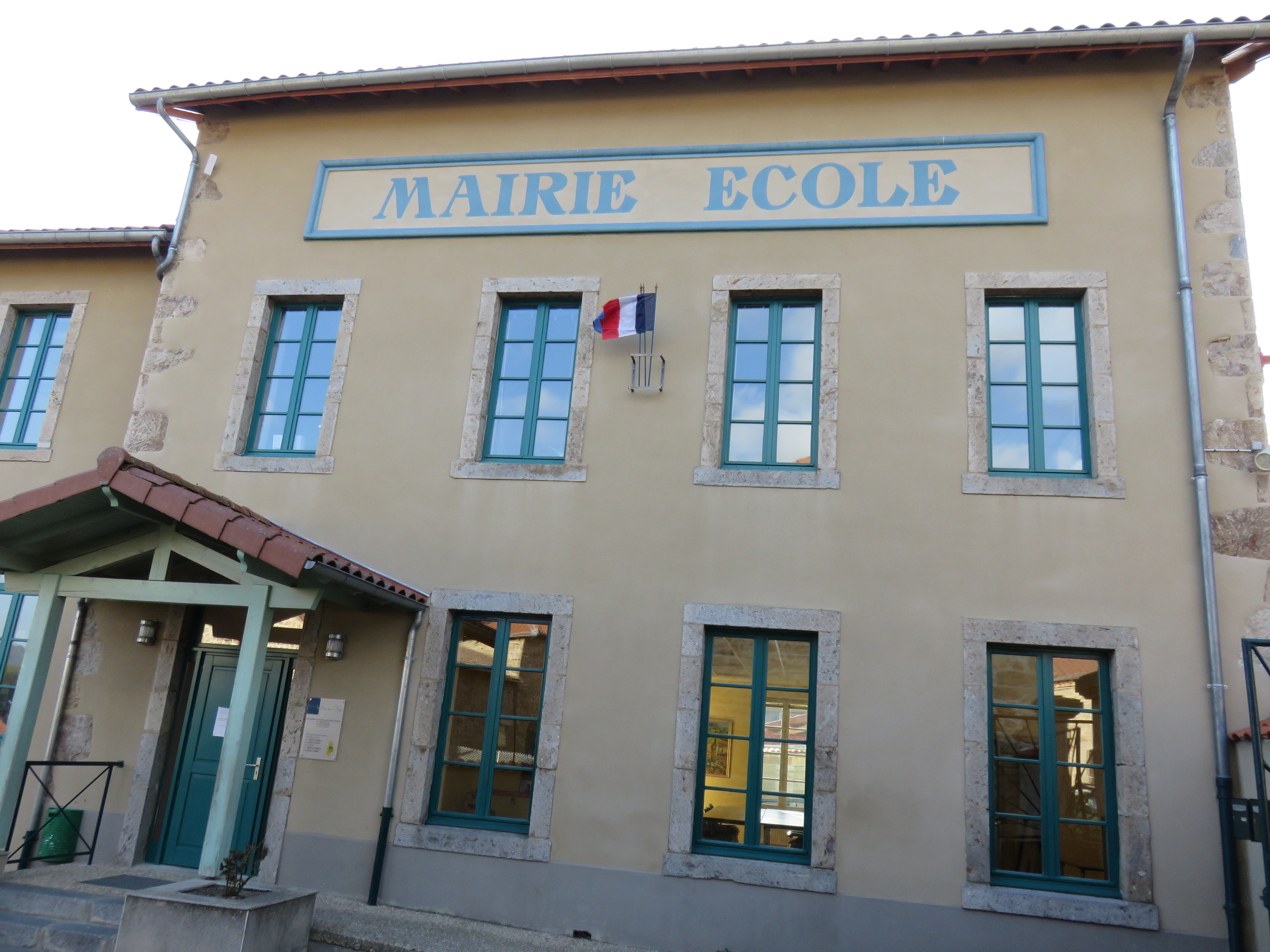
- The town hall in Saillant
- Location of Saillant
- Location within France Location within Auvergne-Rhône-Alpes
- Coordinates: 45°27′25″N 3°54′50″E
- Country: France
- Region: Auvergne-Rhône-Alpes
- Department: Puy-de-Dôme
- Arrondissement: Ambert
- Canton: Ambert

Government
  - Mayor (2026–32): Michel Roche
- Area^{1}: 17.42 km^{2} (6.73 sq mi)
- Elevation: 940 m (3,080 ft)
- Highest elevation: 1,202 m (3,944 ft)
- Lowest elevation: 835 m (2,740 ft)
- Population (2023): 315
  - Density: 18.1/km^{2} (46.8/sq mi)
- Time zone: UTC+01:00 (CET)
  - Summer (DST): UTC+02:00 (CEST)
- INSEE/Postal code: 63309 /63840
- ^{1} French Land Register data, which excludes lakes, ponds, glaciers > 1 km^{2} (0.386 sq mi or 247 acres) and river estuaries.

Saillant (French pronunciation: [sajɑ̃]) is a commune in the Puy-de-Dôme department in Auvergne in central France.

== See also ==
- Communes of the Puy-de-Dôme department
