= Augerolles =

- Commune
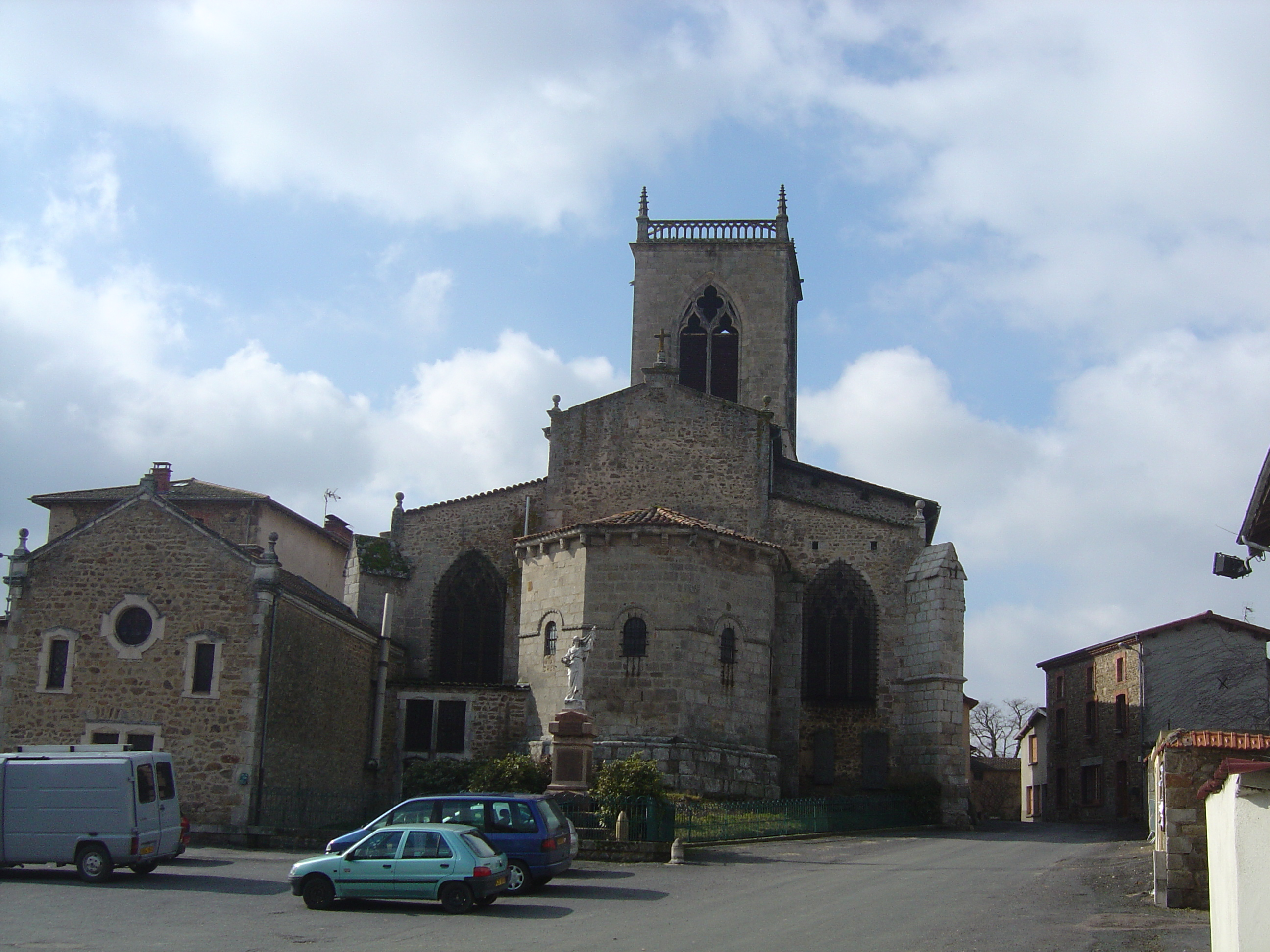
- The church in Augerolles

- Coat of arms
- Location of Augerolles
- Location within France Location within Auvergne-Rhône-Alpes
- Coordinates: 45°43′25″N 3°37′03″E
- Country: France
- Region: Auvergne-Rhône-Alpes
- Department: Puy-de-Dôme
- Arrondissement: Thiers
- Canton: Les Monts du Livradois
- Intercommunality: Thiers Dore et Montagne

Government
  - Mayor (2026–32): Ludovic Combe
- Area^{1}: 33.01 km^{2} (12.75 sq mi)
- Elevation: 550 m (1,800 ft)
- Highest elevation: 995 m (3,264 ft)
- Lowest elevation: 377 m (1,237 ft)
- Population (2023): 862
  - Density: 26.1/km^{2} (67.6/sq mi)
- Time zone: UTC+01:00 (CET)
  - Summer (DST): UTC+02:00 (CEST)
- INSEE/Postal code: 63016 /63930
- ^{1} French Land Register data, which excludes lakes, ponds, glaciers > 1 km^{2} (0.386 sq mi or 247 acres) and river estuaries.

Augerolles (French pronunciation: [oʒʁɔl]) is a commune in the Puy-de-Dôme department in Auvergne-Rhône-Alpes in central France.

== History ==
=== The Church ===
The church in Augerolles, a historic site, was altered throughout the 11th to 14th centuries that resulted in a combination of Romanesque and Gothic style. At 35 meters tall, the old bell tower was demolished during the French Revolution and the bells were melted. The bell tower was rebuilt in 1844 with two new bells. Under the choir is a funeral crypt in which the lords of the manor and priors of the castles of Frédeville and Grimardies are buried.

=== Lords ===
Three noble families follow one another in the history of Augerolles: The d'Ogerolles family, owners of the priory which they yielded to the monks around the year 1000; then, the de Frédeville family, for nearly five centuries, who left their name to a hamlet (their castle today is in ruins); and the de Provenchères family, for three centuries, who lived in the castle of Grimardies (from the 15th century).

=== Revolutionary period ===
On 1 February 1790, the commune of Augerolles was divided into two parts: Le Bourg and Frédeville. From 1790 to 1800 the commune was the chief town of the canton, encompassing Aubusson, Augerolles, and Olmet.

In 1793, the bell tower was destroyed but the church was saved because of local intervention. The municipal council decided to rebuild the bell tower and renovate the church in 1803. The castle of Frédeville was also demolished in 1793 under the order of the Director of Thiers.

== Population ==
Historical population

Year	Pop.	±% p.a.
1876	2,706	—
1962	1,292	−0.86%
1968	1,239	−0.70%
1975	1,160	−0.94%
1982	967	−2.57%
1990	894	−0.98%

Year	Pop.	±% p.a.
1999	889	−0.06%
2007	909	+0.28%
2012	858	−1.15%
2017	888	+0.69%
2023	862	−0.49%

Source: EHESS and INSEE

== See also ==
- Communes of the Puy-de-Dôme department
