= Le Brugeron =

- Commune
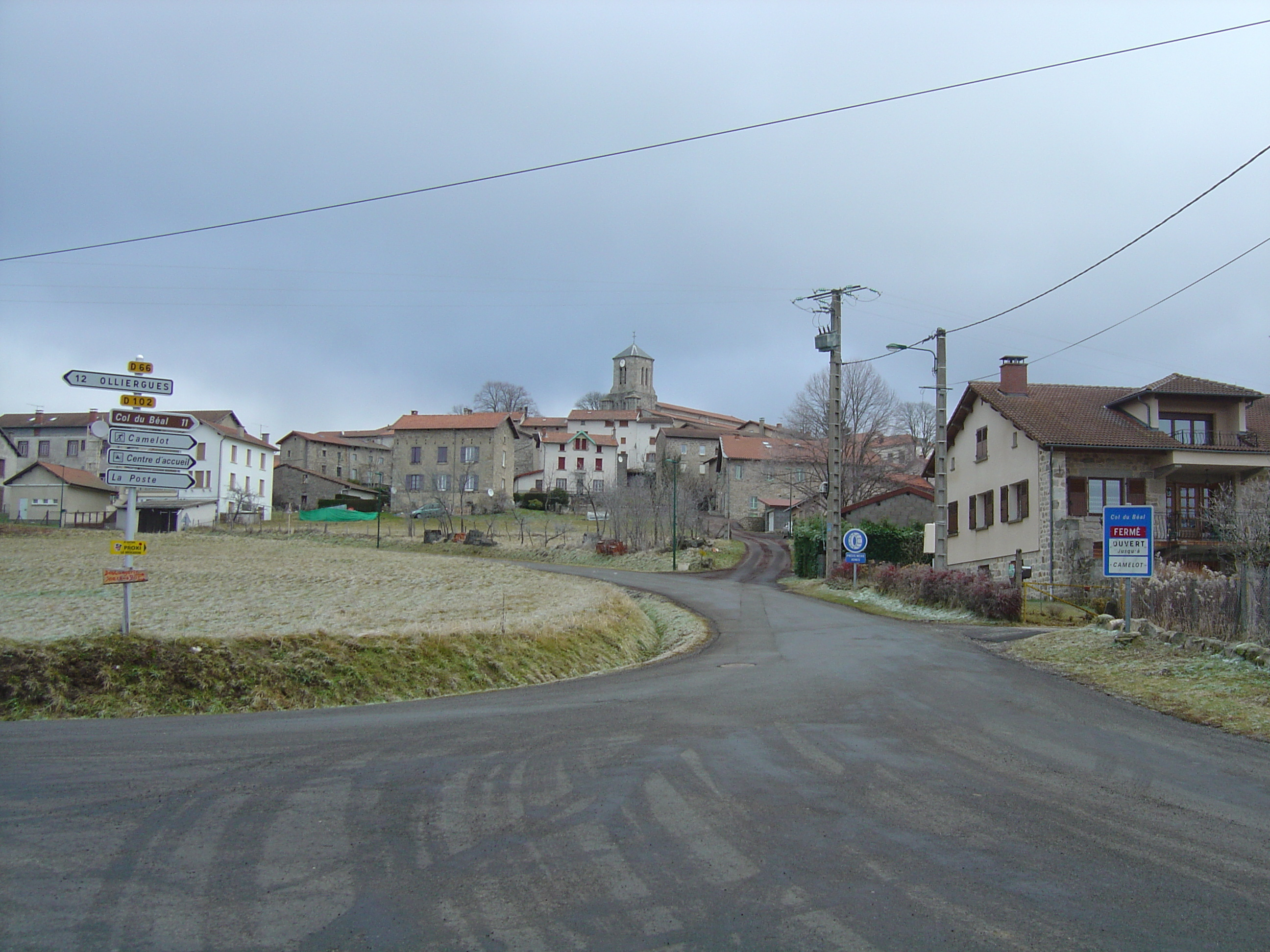
- A general view of Le Brugeron

- Coat of arms
- Location of Le Brugeron
- Location within France Location within Auvergne-Rhône-Alpes
- Coordinates: 45°42′46″N 3°43′11″E
- Country: France
- Region: Auvergne-Rhône-Alpes
- Department: Puy-de-Dôme
- Arrondissement: Ambert
- Canton: Les Monts du Livradois

Government
  - Mayor (2020–2026): Roger Dubien
- Area^{1}: 27.42 km^{2} (10.59 sq mi)
- Elevation: 817 m (2,680 ft)
- Highest elevation: 1,427 m (4,682 ft)
- Lowest elevation: 671 m (2,201 ft)
- Population (2023): 256
  - Density: 9.34/km^{2} (24.2/sq mi)
- Time zone: UTC+01:00 (CET)
  - Summer (DST): UTC+02:00 (CEST)
- INSEE/Postal code: 63057 /63880
- ^{1} French Land Register data, which excludes lakes, ponds, glaciers > 1 km^{2} (0.386 sq mi or 247 acres) and river estuaries.

Le Brugeron (French pronunciation: [lə bʁyʒʁɔ̃]) is a commune in the Puy-de-Dôme department in Auvergne-Rhône-Alpes in central France.

== Population ==
Historical population
| Year | Pop. | ±% p.a. |
|---|---|---|
| 1968 | 602 | — |
| 1975 | 539 | −1.57% |
| 1982 | 411 | −3.80% |
| 1990 | 359 | −1.68% |
| 1999 | 274 | −2.96% |
| 2007 | 267 | −0.32% |
| 2012 | 251 | −1.23% |
| 2017 | 245 | −0.48% |
| 2023 | 256 | +0.73% |
Source: INSEE

== See also ==
- Communes of the Puy-de-Dôme department
- Parc naturel régional Livradois-Forez
