= Saint-Gervais-sous-Meymont =

- Commune
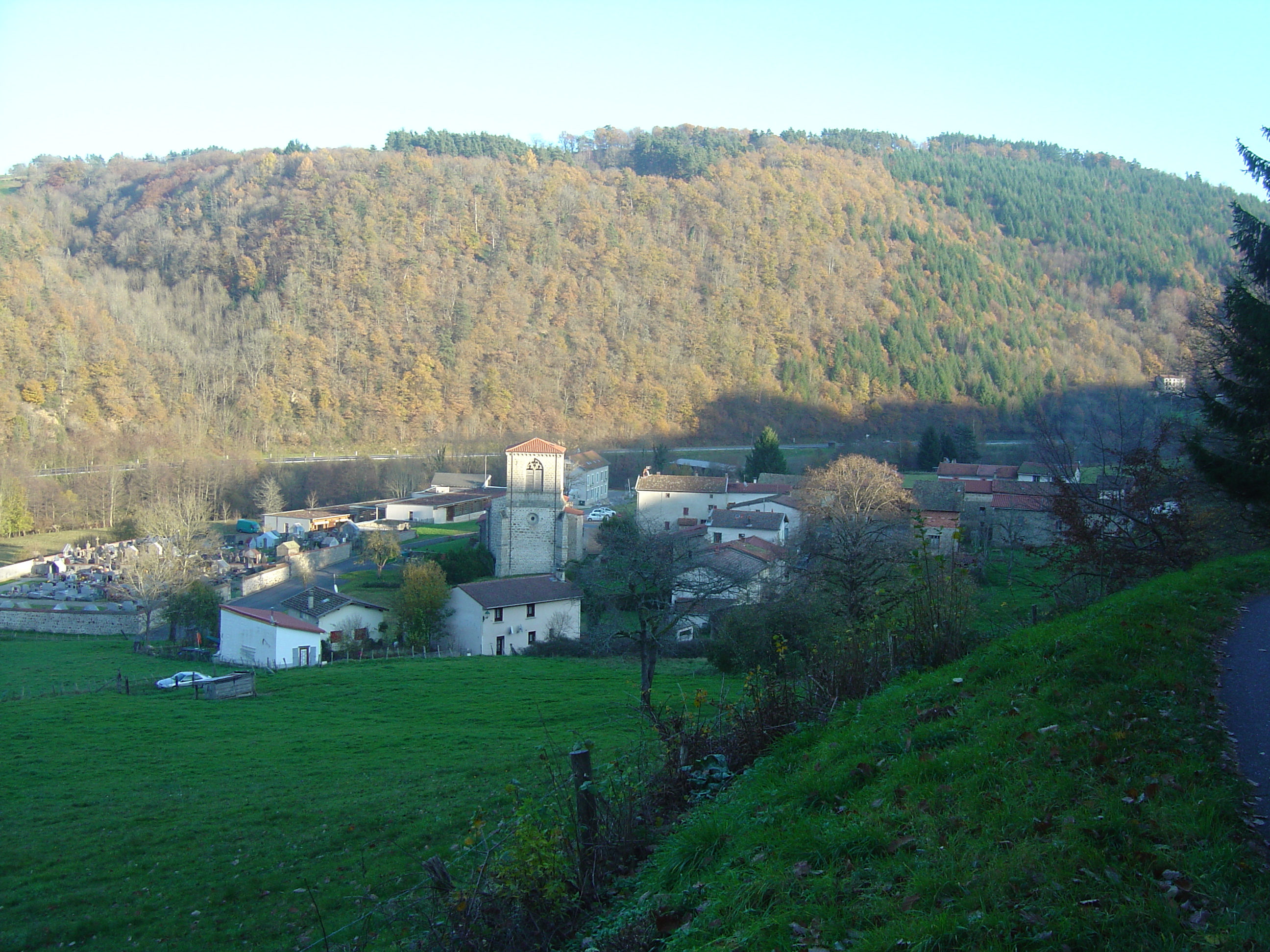
- A general view of Saint-Gervais-sous-Meymont
- Location of Saint-Gervais-sous-Meymont
- Location within France Location within Auvergne-Rhône-Alpes
- Coordinates: 45°41′24″N 3°36′29″E
- Country: France
- Region: Auvergne-Rhône-Alpes
- Department: Puy-de-Dôme
- Arrondissement: Ambert
- Canton: Les Monts du Livradois

Government
  - Mayor (2020–2026): Eric Dubourgnoux
- Area^{1}: 10.17 km^{2} (3.93 sq mi)
- Elevation: 410 m (1,350 ft)
- Highest elevation: 781 m (2,562 ft)
- Lowest elevation: 393 m (1,289 ft)
- Population (2023): 213
  - Density: 20.9/km^{2} (54.2/sq mi)
- Time zone: UTC+01:00 (CET)
  - Summer (DST): UTC+02:00 (CEST)
- INSEE/Postal code: 63355 /63880
- ^{1} French Land Register data, which excludes lakes, ponds, glaciers > 1 km^{2} (0.386 sq mi or 247 acres) and river estuaries.

Saint-Gervais-sous-Meymont (French pronunciation: [sɛ̃ ʒɛʁvɛ su memɔ̃]; Auvergnat: Sent Gervasi de Maimont) is a commune in the Puy-de-Dôme department in Auvergne in central France.

The commune is a member of Parc naturel régional Livradois-Forez and hosts the park's main information center.

== See also ==
- Communes of the Puy-de-Dôme department
