= La Chapelle-Agnon =

- Commune
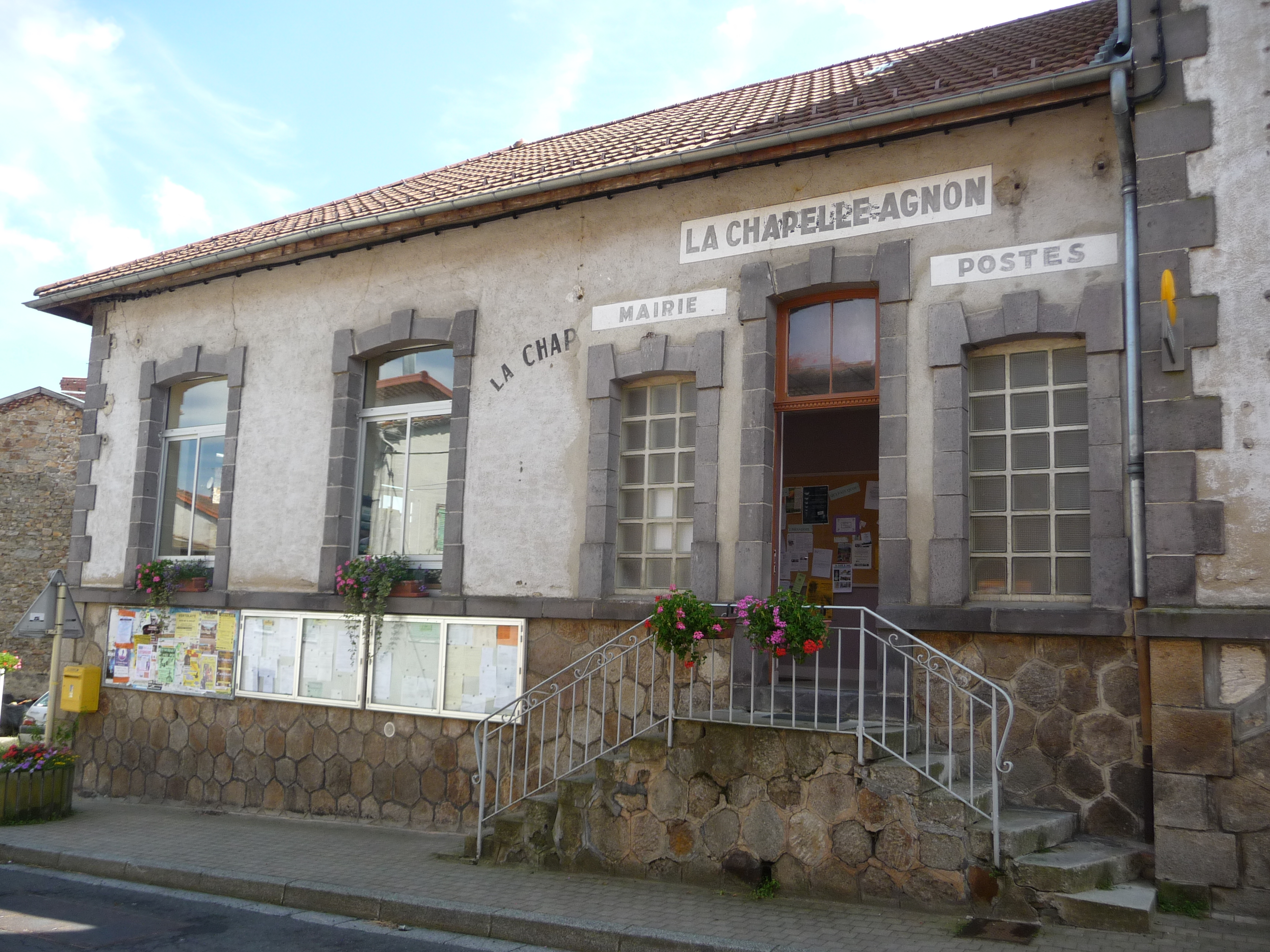
- The town hall in La Chapelle-Agnon

- Coat of arms
- Location of La Chapelle-Agnon
- Location within France Location within Auvergne-Rhône-Alpes
- Coordinates: 45°38′03″N 3°38′19″E
- Country: France
- Region: Auvergne-Rhône-Alpes
- Department: Puy-de-Dôme
- Arrondissement: Ambert
- Canton: Les Monts du Livradois

Government
  - Mayor (2020–2026): Fabienne Gachon
- Area^{1}: 26.08 km^{2} (10.07 sq mi)
- Elevation: 700 m (2,300 ft)
- Highest elevation: 1,003 m (3,291 ft)
- Lowest elevation: 470 m (1,540 ft)
- Population (2023): 361
  - Density: 13.8/km^{2} (35.9/sq mi)
- Time zone: UTC+01:00 (CET)
  - Summer (DST): UTC+02:00 (CEST)
- INSEE/Postal code: 63086 /63590
- ^{1} French Land Register data, which excludes lakes, ponds, glaciers > 1 km^{2} (0.386 sq mi or 247 acres) and river estuaries.

La Chapelle-Agnon (French pronunciation: [la ʃapɛl aɲɔ̃]; Occitan: La Chapèla Anhon) is a commune in the Puy-de-Dôme department in Auvergne-Rhône-Alpes in central France.

The commune of La Chapelle-Agnon is adherent to Parc naturel régional Livradois-Forez (Livradois-Forez Regional Nature Park)

== See also ==
- Communes of the Puy-de-Dôme department
