= Grandval =

Grandval (French pronunciation: [ɡʁɑ̃val]; meaning great valley in French) may refer to:

== People ==
- Charles-François Racot de Grandval (1710–84), French actor and playwright
- Clémence de Grandval (1828–1907), French composer
- Randoald of Grandval (died 675), Swiss saint

== Places ==
- Grandval, Puy-de-Dôme, commune in Puy-de-Dôme, France
- Grandval, Switzerland, municipality in Berne, Switzerland
- Lac de Grandval, lake in Cantal, France
