= Rose Combe =

French writer

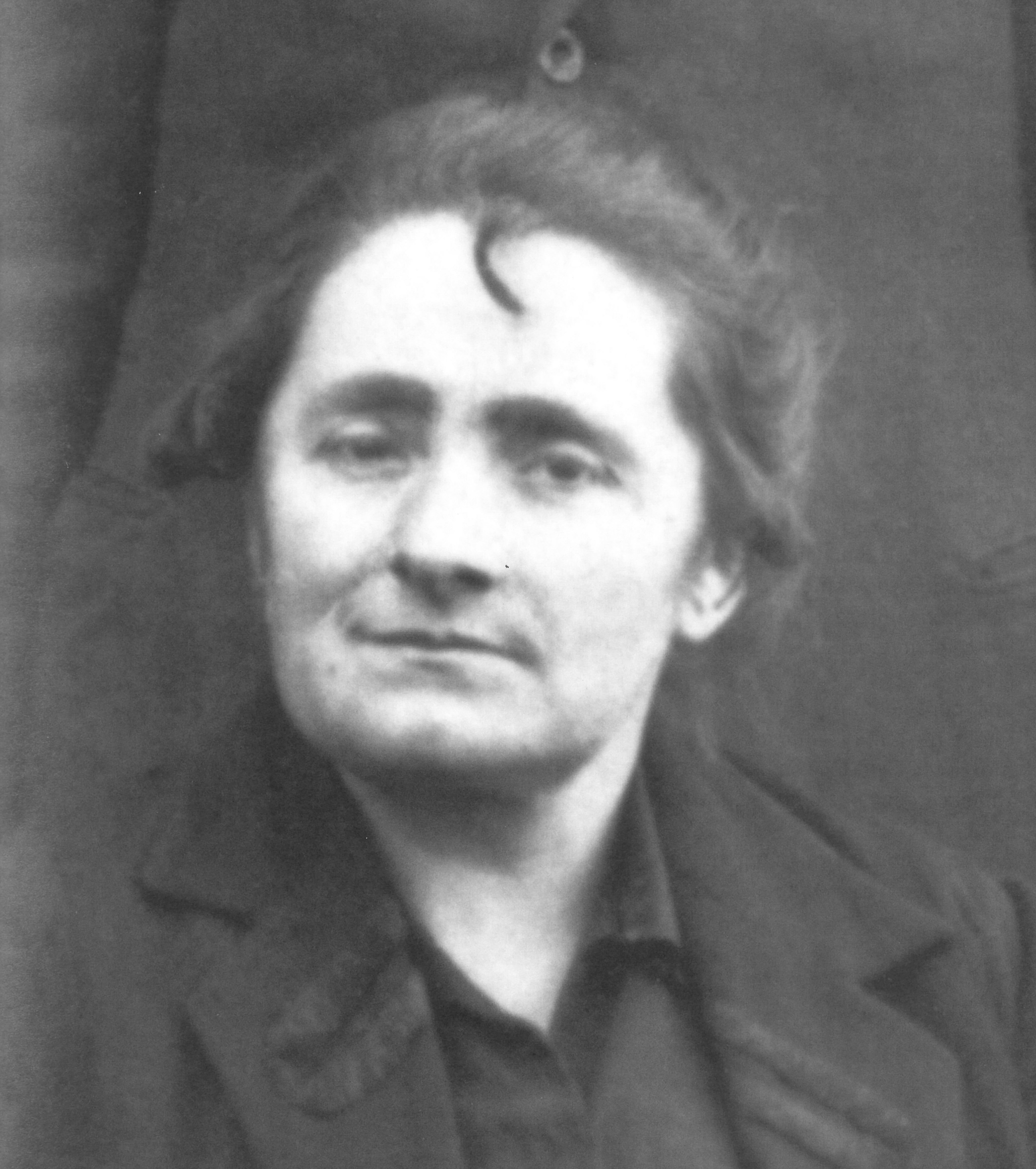
- Rose Combe in about 1930
- Born: Marie-Rosalie Bugne; 14 September 1883; Olmet, France
- Died: 24 September 1932 (aged 49); Clermont-Ferrand, France
- Occupation: Level crossing operator
- Writing career
- Language: French
- Genre: Proletarian literature

Rose Combe, born Marie-Rosalie Bugne (14 September 1883 – 24 September 1932), was a French railway worker and writer, viewed as an archetype of Proletarian literature. Born into a poor family, despite receiving little education, she was a voracious reader and memorised one of the few books she had access to, an almanac, by the age of four. She wanted to be a teacher but instead worked for the railway between Ambert and Thiers as a level crossing operator. She continued to write, however, and through the author Henri Pourrat, who lived locally, was first published in 1927. Her work was subsequently printed in L'Auvergne littéraire et artistique and her novel Le Mile des Garre appeared in 1931. She was known as the La Garde-Barrière Auvergnate (the Auvergne Gatekeeper) from her job on the railway. She died in 1932, much of her work still unpublished.

== Biography ==
Marie-Rosalie Bugne was born in Olmet in the French Third Republic on 4 September 1883. Her father, Joseph Bugne, was a navvy on the railway between Ambert and Thiers, Puy-de-Dôme. As a young chid, she moved with her father's work, receiving little schooling. There were few books in the household but she showed a keen desire to read from an early age. By the age of four, she had memorised one of the few books owned by the family, an almanac. Despite frequent periods of absence, she left elementary school with a certificate of study. She aspired to be a teacher; however, instead she was employed as a level crossing operator on the railway line her father had helped create, the Auvergne-Rhône-Alpes. She married Jean-Marie Combe, a local farmer, in 1903.

Her desire to read was not abated by the lack of books in her life and she began to write in 1916. Her initial writing combined a private diary with incomplete stories. However, as her confidence grew, she contacted Henri Pourrat, who also lived in Ambert, to ask for advice. Reading her work, he connected her to other local authors, including Lucien Gachon, Pierre Balme, Georges Desdevises du Dézert, Alexandre Vialatte and Amelie Murat.

Her first work was published in the journal L'Auvergne littéraire in 1927. Her writing was generally well-received, particularly her novel Le Mile des Garret, published by Henri Poulaille in 1931 with a preface by Alexandre Vialatte. The novel was critically reviewed in Le Monde, which led to Lucien Gachon writing a staunch defence of her writing.

Her popularity at this time was increasing. She was viewed as an archetype of Proletarian literature and acquired the nickname La Garde-Barrière Auvergnate (The Auvergne Gatekeeper) from her job on the railway. However, she was also increasingly unwell. At the peak of her popularity, she died on 24 September 1932 at the hospital in Clermont-Ferrand.

== Selected Writing ==
Combe wrote a single novel, Le Mile des Garret, which was originally published in 1931 as part the Romans du Nouvel Age collection. Much of her work was still uncategorised at her death, and remained unpublished. Other writing included:

- Accordailles, L'Auvergne littéraire et artistique, n. 38, 1928, p. 38–40
- Vieilles choses, L'Auvergne littéraire et artistique, n. 48, 1929 p. 13–25
- Histoires d'un fantaisiste, L'Auvergne littéraire et artistique, n. 48, 1929, p. 26–27
- Histoire de ce canton, Almanach des Champs, 1930, p. 43–49
- Gens des routes, Almanach des Champs, 1930, p. 108–112
- Reptiles dans la campagne, Almanach des Champs, 1930 p. 43–49
- Divertissements d'autrefois, L'Auvergne littéraire et artistique, n. 60, 1931, p. 21–24
- Comment je me mis à écrire, Les Cahiers bourbonnais : arts, lettres & vie en pays bourbonnais, n. 35, 1966, p. 2–5
