= Fayet =

Fayet may refer to:

- Fayet, Aisne, a commune in the department of Aisne
- Fayet, Aveyron, a commune in the department of Aveyron
- Fayet-le-Château, a commune in the department of Puy-de-Dôme
- Fayet-Ronaye, a commune in the department of Puy-de-Dôme
- Gustave Fayet, French painter
