= Marat, Puy-de-Dôme =

Marat
- Commune
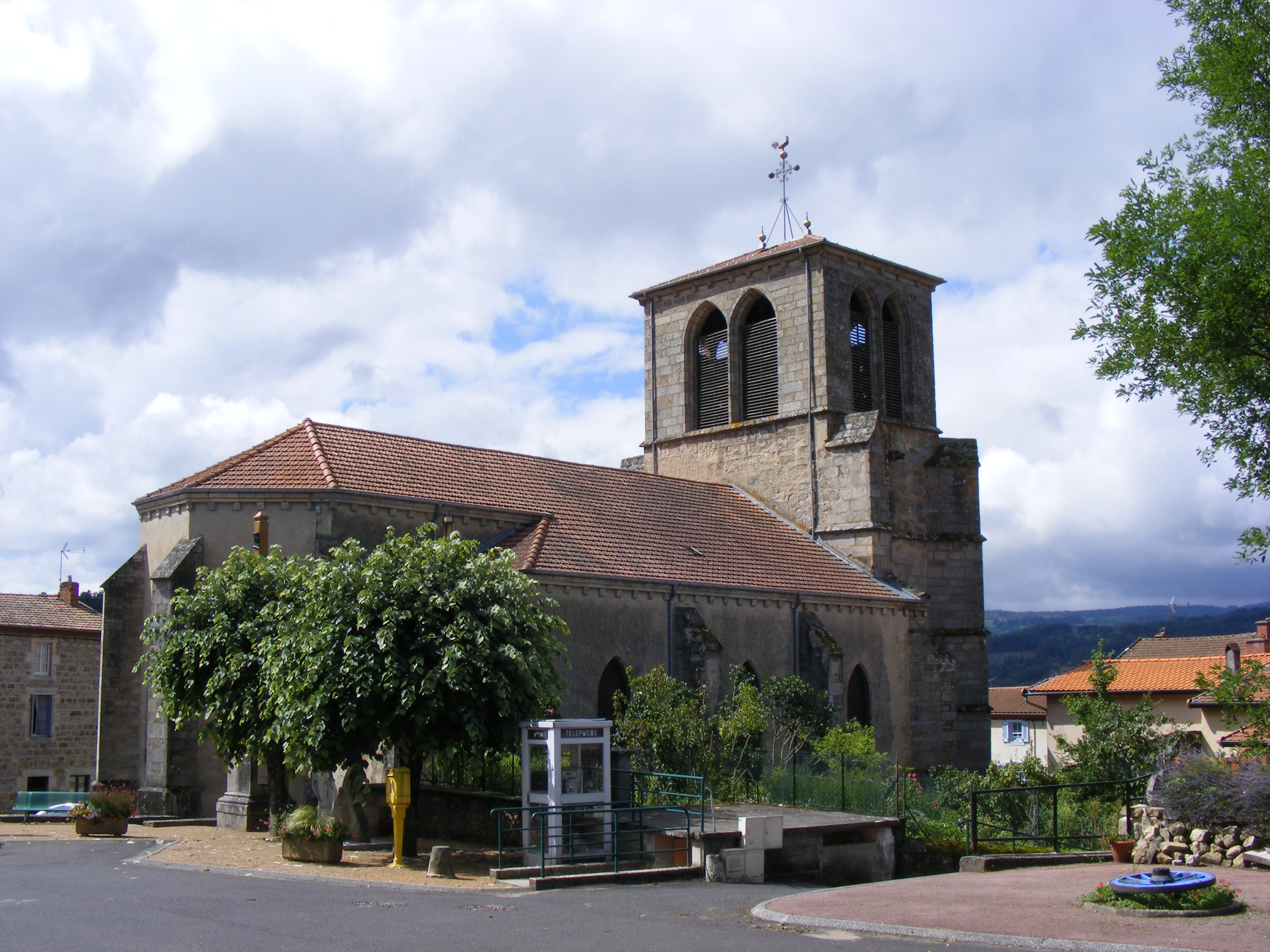
- The church in Marat
- Location of Marat
- Location within France Location within Auvergne-Rhône-Alpes
- Coordinates: 45°39′36″N 3°41′01″E
- Country: France
- Region: Auvergne-Rhône-Alpes
- Department: Puy-de-Dôme
- Arrondissement: Ambert
- Canton: Les Monts du Livradois
- Intercommunality: Ambert Livradois Forez

Government
  - Mayor (2020–2026): Patrice Douarre
- Area^{1}: 30.10 km^{2} (11.62 sq mi)
- Elevation: 550 m (1,800 ft)
- Highest elevation: 1,025 m (3,363 ft)
- Lowest elevation: 436 m (1,430 ft)
- Population (2023): 801
  - Density: 26.6/km^{2} (68.9/sq mi)
- Time zone: UTC+01:00 (CET)
  - Summer (DST): UTC+02:00 (CEST)
- INSEE/Postal code: 63207 /63480
- ^{1} French Land Register data, which excludes lakes, ponds, glaciers > 1 km^{2} (0.386 sq mi or 247 acres) and river estuaries.

Marat (French pronunciation: [maʁa]) is a commune in the Puy-de-Dôme department in Auvergne in central France.

== See also ==
- Communes of the Puy-de-Dôme department
