= Néronde-sur-Dore =

- Commune
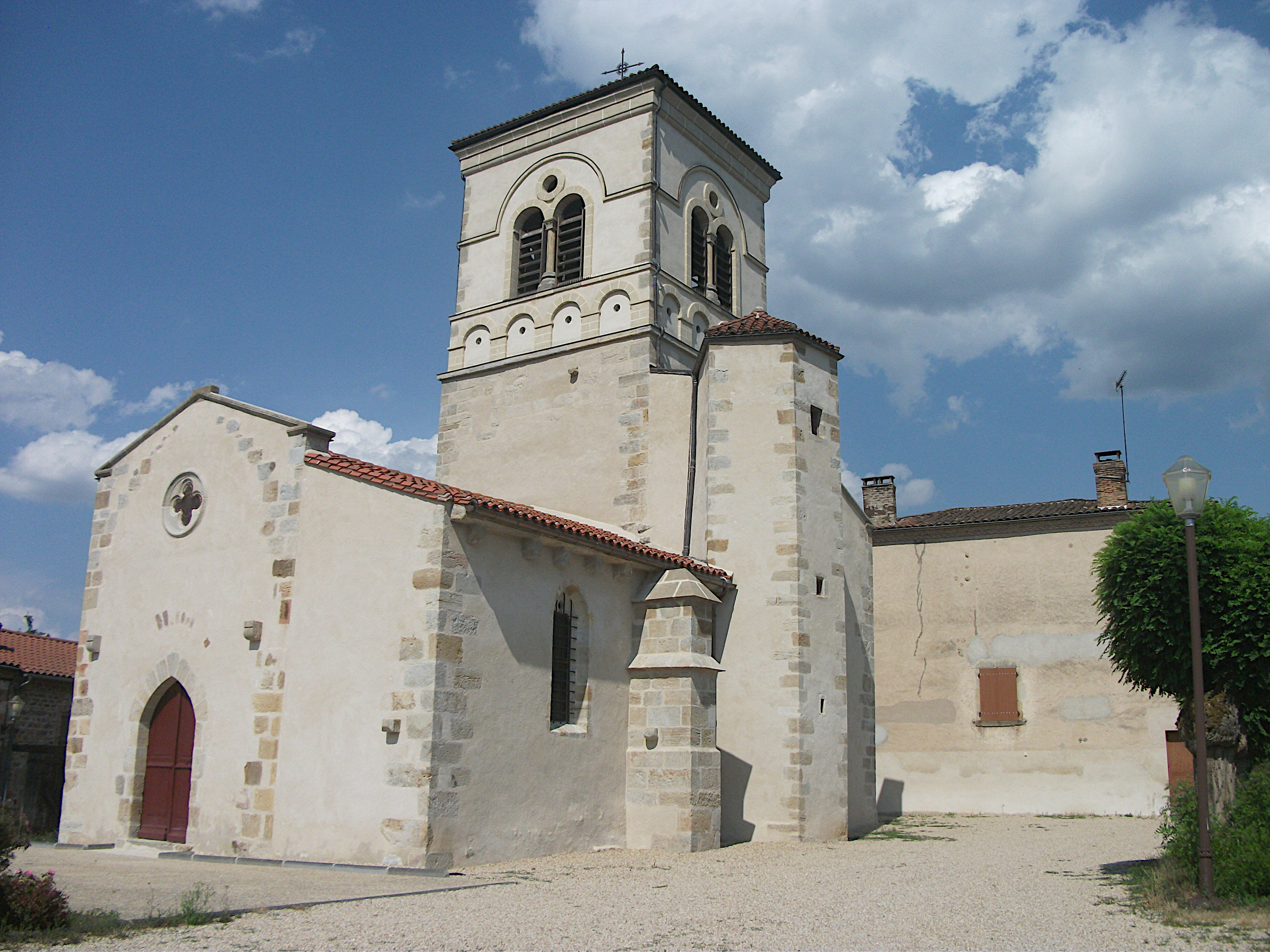
- Church

- Coat of arms
- Location of Néronde-sur-Dore
- Location within France Location within Auvergne-Rhône-Alpes
- Coordinates: 45°47′53″N 3°31′23″E
- Country: France
- Region: Auvergne-Rhône-Alpes
- Department: Puy-de-Dôme
- Arrondissement: Thiers
- Canton: Les Monts du Livradois
- Intercommunality: Thiers Dore et Montagne

Government
  - Mayor (2020–2026): Michel Gonin
- Area^{1}: 8.93 km^{2} (3.45 sq mi)
- Elevation: 304 m (997 ft)
- Highest elevation: 423 m (1,388 ft)
- Lowest elevation: 294 m (965 ft)
- Population (2023): 483
  - Density: 54.1/km^{2} (140/sq mi)
- Time zone: UTC+01:00 (CET)
  - Summer (DST): UTC+02:00 (CEST)
- INSEE/Postal code: 63249 /63120
- ^{1} French Land Register data, which excludes lakes, ponds, glaciers > 1 km^{2} (0.386 sq mi or 247 acres) and river estuaries.

Néronde-sur-Dore (French pronunciation: [neʁɔ̃d syʁ dɔʁ], literally Néronde on Dore; Occitan: Neironda) is a commune in the Puy-de-Dôme department in Auvergne-Rhône-Alpes in central France.

== See also ==
- Communes of the Puy-de-Dôme department
