= Saint-Germain-l'Herm =

- Commune
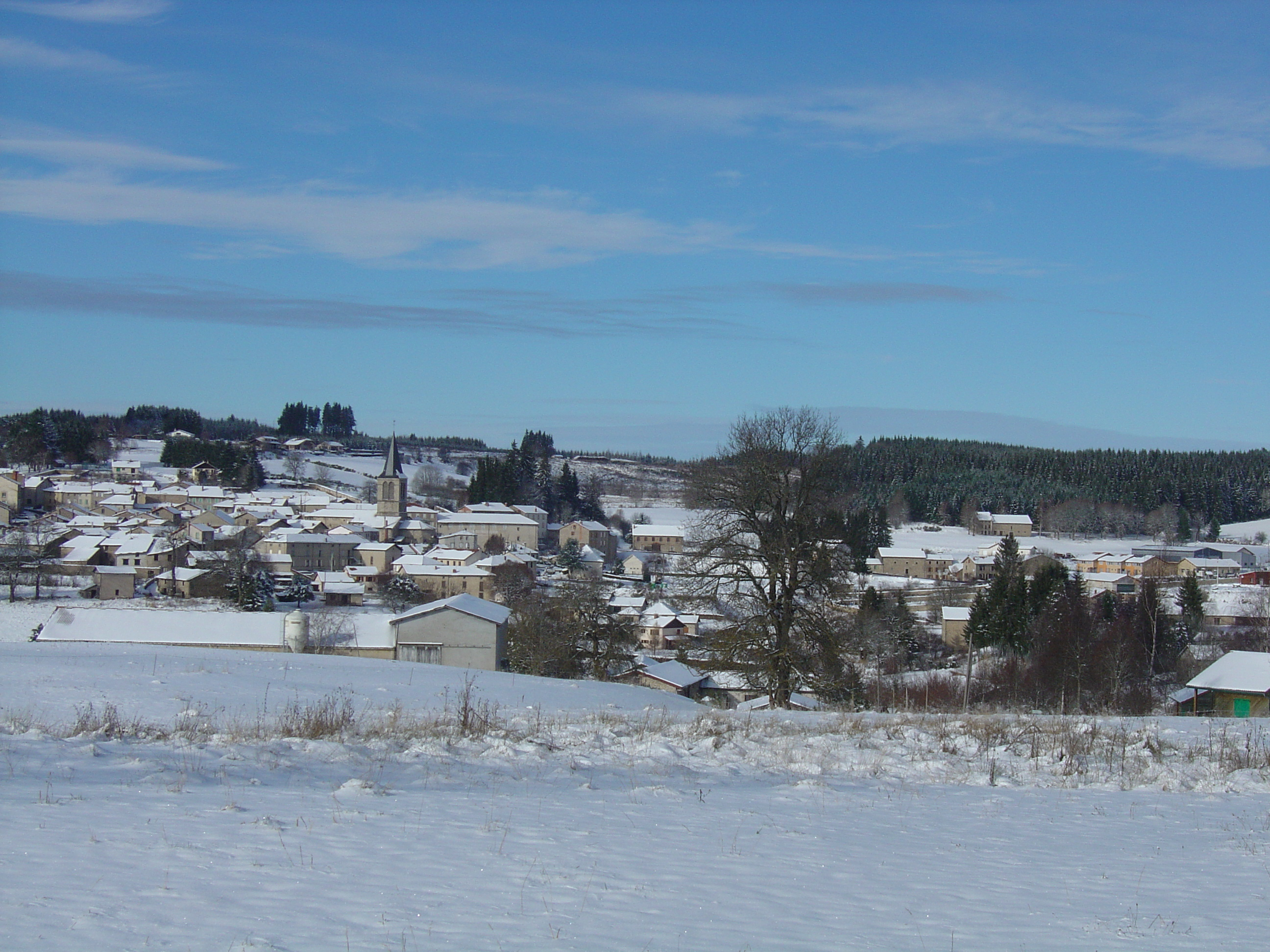
- A general view of Saint-Germain-l'Herm

- Coat of arms
- Location of Saint-Germain-l'Herm
- Location within France Location within Auvergne-Rhône-Alpes
- Coordinates: 45°27′34″N 3°32′32″E
- Country: France
- Region: Auvergne-Rhône-Alpes
- Department: Puy-de-Dôme
- Arrondissement: Ambert
- Canton: Les Monts du Livradois
- Intercommunality: Ambert Livradois Forez

Government
  - Mayor (2026–32): Chantal Desgeorges
- Area^{1}: 36.68 km^{2} (14.16 sq mi)
- Elevation: 1,050 m (3,440 ft)
- Highest elevation: 1,135 m (3,724 ft)
- Lowest elevation: 860 m (2,820 ft)
- Population (2023): 482
  - Density: 13.1/km^{2} (34.0/sq mi)
- Time zone: UTC+01:00 (CET)
  - Summer (DST): UTC+02:00 (CEST)
- INSEE/Postal code: 63353 /63630
- ^{1} French Land Register data, which excludes lakes, ponds, glaciers > 1 km^{2} (0.386 sq mi or 247 acres) and river estuaries.

Saint-Germain-l'Herm (French pronunciation: [sɛ̃ ʒɛʁmɛ̃ lɛʁm]; Occitan: Sant German de l'Erm) is a commune in the Puy-de-Dôme department in Auvergne in central France.

== Climate ==
Climate data for Saint-Germain-l'Herm (1997–2020 averages)
Month	Jan	Feb	Mar	Apr	May	Jun	Jul	Aug	Sep	Oct	Nov	Dec	Year
Record high °C (°F)	18.6 (65.5)	20.3 (68.5)	21.6 (70.9)	24.9 (76.8)	28.8 (83.8)	35.5 (95.9)	33.9 (93.0)	33.9 (93.0)	31.0 (87.8)	27.5 (81.5)	21.7 (71.1)	18.5 (65.3)	35.5 (95.9)
Mean daily maximum °C (°F)	3.6 (38.5)	4.2 (39.6)	8.1 (46.6)	11.5 (52.7)	15.4 (59.7)	19.7 (67.5)	21.8 (71.2)	21.8 (71.2)	17.7 (63.9)	13.2 (55.8)	7.3 (45.1)	4.5 (40.1)	12.4 (54.3)
Daily mean °C (°F)	0.4 (32.7)	0.6 (33.1)	3.8 (38.8)	6.8 (44.2)	10.5 (50.9)	14.4 (57.9)	16.2 (61.2)	16.2 (61.2)	12.7 (54.9)	9.2 (48.6)	4.0 (39.2)	1.3 (34.3)	8.0 (46.4)
Mean daily minimum °C (°F)	−2.7 (27.1)	−3.0 (26.6)	−0.5 (31.1)	2.1 (35.8)	5.6 (42.1)	9.0 (48.2)	10.6 (51.1)	10.7 (51.3)	7.6 (45.7)	5.1 (41.2)	0.7 (33.3)	−1.8 (28.8)	3.6 (38.5)
Record low °C (°F)	−16.6 (2.1)	−18.4 (−1.1)	−19.9 (−3.8)	−9.0 (15.8)	−4.0 (24.8)	−1.1 (30.0)	2.8 (37.0)	1.3 (34.3)	−1.5 (29.3)	−9.3 (15.3)	−14.2 (6.4)	−15.8 (3.6)	−19.9 (−3.8)
Average precipitation mm (inches)	69.6 (2.74)	59.3 (2.33)	66.8 (2.63)	98.8 (3.89)	122.7 (4.83)	86.7 (3.41)	90.7 (3.57)	106.1 (4.18)	92.1 (3.63)	97.7 (3.85)	99.3 (3.91)	77.5 (3.05)	1,067.3 (42.02)
Average precipitation days (≥ 1.0 mm)	12.3	11.3	11.4	12.6	12.6	10.0	9.9	9.8	9.5	11.2	13.1	12.2	135.9
Mean monthly sunshine hours	82.9	105.5	159.8	176.4	182.4	213.9	241.9	230.3	187.7	130.0	82.2	76.1	1,869
Source: Meteociel

== See also ==
- Communes of the Puy-de-Dôme department
