= Brousse, Puy-de-Dôme =

Brousse
- Commune
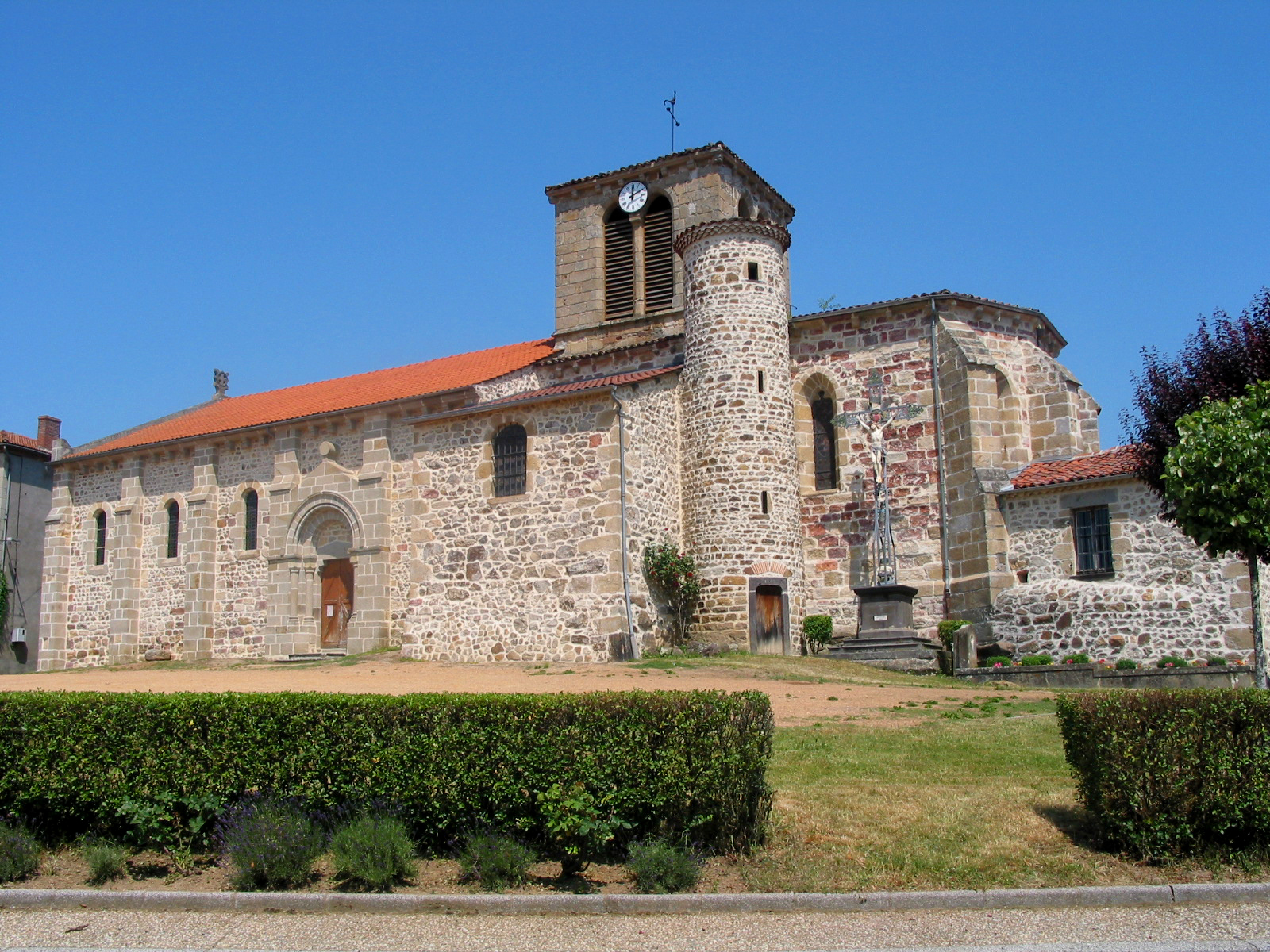
- The church in Brousse

- Coat of arms
- Location of Brousse
- Location within France Location within Auvergne-Rhône-Alpes
- Coordinates: 45°36′09″N 3°27′34″E
- Country: France
- Region: Auvergne-Rhône-Alpes
- Department: Puy-de-Dôme
- Arrondissement: Ambert
- Canton: Les Monts du Livradois

Government
  - Mayor (2026–32): Sébastien Dugnas
- Area^{1}: 22.45 km^{2} (8.67 sq mi)
- Elevation: 638 m (2,093 ft)
- Highest elevation: 854 m (2,802 ft)
- Lowest elevation: 497 m (1,631 ft)
- Population (2023): 372
  - Density: 16.6/km^{2} (42.9/sq mi)
- Time zone: UTC+01:00 (CET)
  - Summer (DST): UTC+02:00 (CEST)
- INSEE/Postal code: 63056 /63490
- ^{1} French Land Register data, which excludes lakes, ponds, glaciers > 1 km^{2} (0.386 sq mi or 247 acres) and river estuaries.

Brousse (French pronunciation: [bʁus]; Occitan: Brossa) is a commune in the Puy-de-Dôme department in Auvergne-Rhône-Alpes in central France.

== Population ==
Historical population
Year	Pop.	±% p.a.
1968	440	—
1975	379	−2.11%
1982	323	−2.26%
1990	278	−1.86%
1999	324	+1.72%
2007	363	+1.43%
2012	350	−0.73%
2017	339	−0.64%
2023	372	+1.56%
Source: INSEE

== See also ==
- Communes of the Puy-de-Dôme department
