= Ceilloux =

- Commune
- Coat of arms
- Location of Ceilloux
- Location within France Location within Auvergne-Rhône-Alpes
- Coordinates: 45°39′12″N 3°30′56″E
- Country: France
- Region: Auvergne-Rhône-Alpes
- Department: Puy-de-Dôme
- Arrondissement: Ambert
- Canton: Les Monts du Livradois

Government
  - Mayor (2026–32): Françoise Marseillès
- Area^{1}: 8.99 km^{2} (3.47 sq mi)
- Elevation: 650 m (2,130 ft)
- Highest elevation: 796 m (2,612 ft)
- Lowest elevation: 474 m (1,555 ft)
- Population (2023): 174
  - Density: 19.4/km^{2} (50.1/sq mi)
- Time zone: UTC+01:00 (CET)
  - Summer (DST): UTC+02:00 (CEST)
- INSEE/Postal code: 63065 /63520
- ^{1} French Land Register data, which excludes lakes, ponds, glaciers > 1 km^{2} (0.386 sq mi or 247 acres) and river estuaries.

Ceilloux (French pronunciation: [sɛju]) is a commune in the Puy-de-Dôme department in Auvergne-Rhône-Alpes in central France.

== Population ==
Historical population
Year	Pop.	±% p.a.
1968	221	—
1975	188	−2.28%
1982	164	−1.93%
1990	145	−1.53%
1999	151	+0.45%
2007	153	+0.16%
2012	159	+0.77%
2017	177	+2.17%
2023	174	−0.28%
Source: INSEE

== See also ==
- Communes of the Puy-de-Dôme department
