= Sainte-Catherine, Puy-de-Dôme =

Sainte-Catherine
- Commune
- Location of Sainte-Catherine
- Location within France Location within Auvergne-Rhône-Alpes
- Coordinates: 45°27′04″N 3°28′26″E
- Country: France
- Region: Auvergne-Rhône-Alpes
- Department: Puy-de-Dôme
- Arrondissement: Ambert
- Canton: Les Monts du Livradois

Government
  - Mayor (2026–32): Daniel Joly
- Area^{1}: 5.67 km^{2} (2.19 sq mi)
- Elevation: 882 m (2,894 ft)
- Highest elevation: 1,090 m (3,580 ft)
- Lowest elevation: 639 m (2,096 ft)
- Population (2023): 57
  - Density: 10/km^{2} (26/sq mi)
- Time zone: UTC+01:00 (CET)
  - Summer (DST): UTC+02:00 (CEST)
- INSEE/Postal code: 63328 /63580
- ^{1} French Land Register data, which excludes lakes, ponds, glaciers > 1 km^{2} (0.386 sq mi or 247 acres) and river estuaries.

Sainte-Catherine (French pronunciation: [sɛ̃t katʁin]; Auvergnat: Senta Catarina) is a commune in the Puy-de-Dôme department in Auvergne in central France.

== See also ==
- Communes of the Puy-de-Dôme department
