= La Renaudie =

- Commune
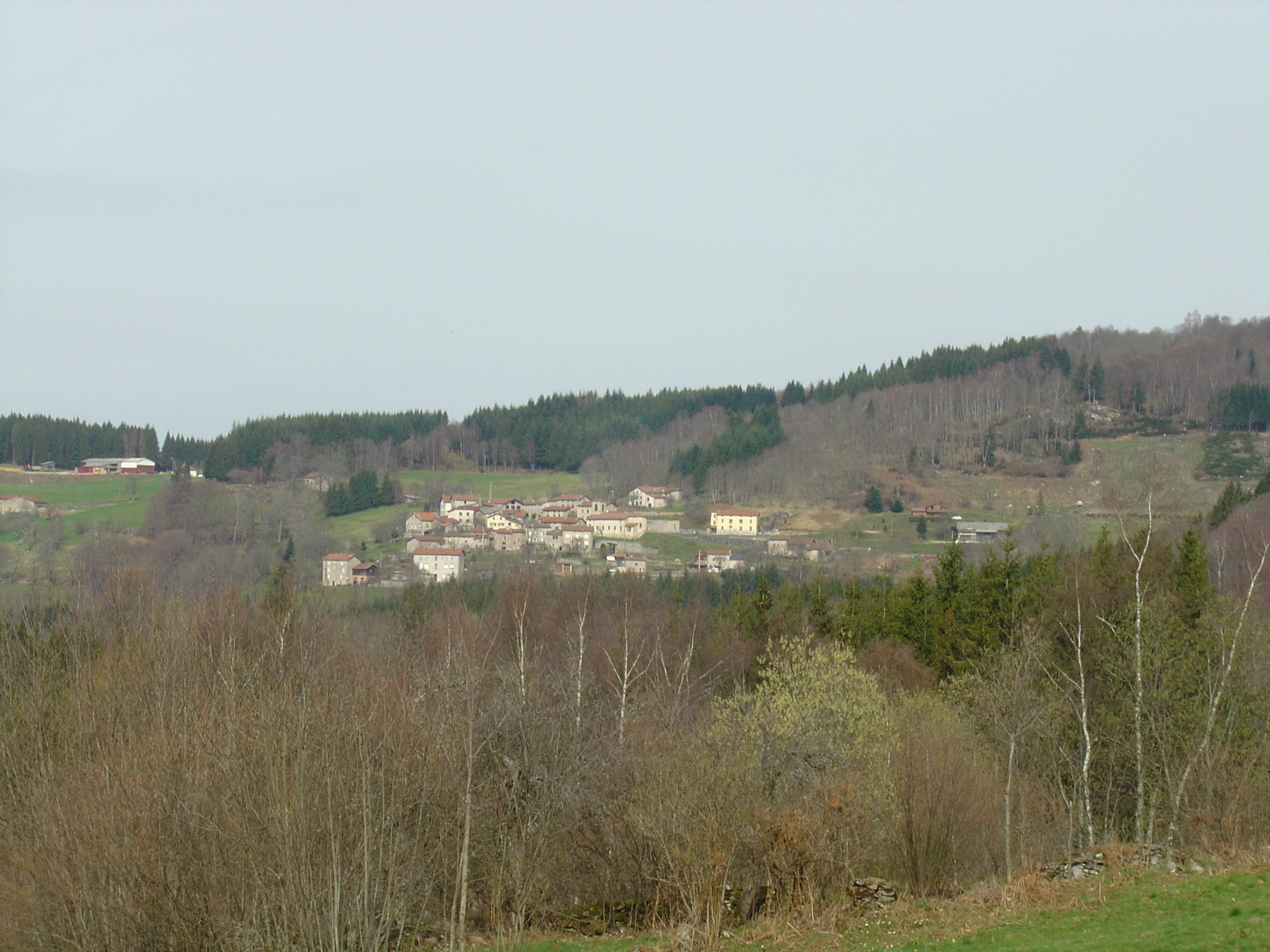
- A general view of La Renaudie
- Location of La Renaudie
- Location within France Location within Auvergne-Rhône-Alpes
- Coordinates: 45°44′10″N 3°43′16″E
- Country: France
- Region: Auvergne-Rhône-Alpes
- Department: Puy-de-Dôme
- Arrondissement: Thiers
- Canton: Les Monts du Livradois
- Intercommunality: Thiers Dore et Montagne

Government
  - Mayor (2026–32): Ghislaine Dubien
- Area^{1}: 18.02 km^{2} (6.96 sq mi)
- Elevation: 935 m (3,068 ft)
- Highest elevation: 1,202 m (3,944 ft)
- Lowest elevation: 684 m (2,244 ft)
- Population (2023): 132
  - Density: 7.33/km^{2} (19.0/sq mi)
- Time zone: UTC+01:00 (CET)
  - Summer (DST): UTC+02:00 (CEST)
- INSEE/Postal code: 63298 /63930
- Website: la-renaudie.fr (French)
- ^{1} French Land Register data, which excludes lakes, ponds, glaciers > 1 km^{2} (0.386 sq mi or 247 acres) and river estuaries.

La Renaudie (French pronunciation: [la ʁənodi]; Occitan: La Renadiá) is a commune in the Puy-de-Dôme department in Auvergne-Rhône-Alpes in central France.

== See also ==
- Communes of the Puy-de-Dôme department
