= Domaize =

- Commune
- Coat of arms
- Location of Domaize
- Location within France Location within Auvergne-Rhône-Alpes
- Coordinates: 45°41′19″N 3°32′12″E
- Country: France
- Region: Auvergne-Rhône-Alpes
- Department: Puy-de-Dôme
- Arrondissement: Ambert
- Canton: Les Monts du Livradois
- Intercommunality: Ambert Livradois Forez

Government
  - Mayor (2026–32): Dominique Cally
- Area^{1}: 14.60 km^{2} (5.64 sq mi)
- Elevation: 530 m (1,740 ft)
- Highest elevation: 702 m (2,303 ft)
- Lowest elevation: 336 m (1,102 ft)
- Population (2023): 386
  - Density: 26.4/km^{2} (68.5/sq mi)
- Time zone: UTC+01:00 (CET)
  - Summer (DST): UTC+02:00 (CEST)
- INSEE/Postal code: 63136 /63520
- ^{1} French Land Register data, which excludes lakes, ponds, glaciers > 1 km^{2} (0.386 sq mi or 247 acres) and river estuaries.

Domaize (French pronunciation: [dɔmɛz]) is a commune in the Puy-de-Dôme department in Auvergne-Rhône-Alpes in central France.

== See also ==
- Communes of the Puy-de-Dôme department
