= Vertolaye =

- Commune
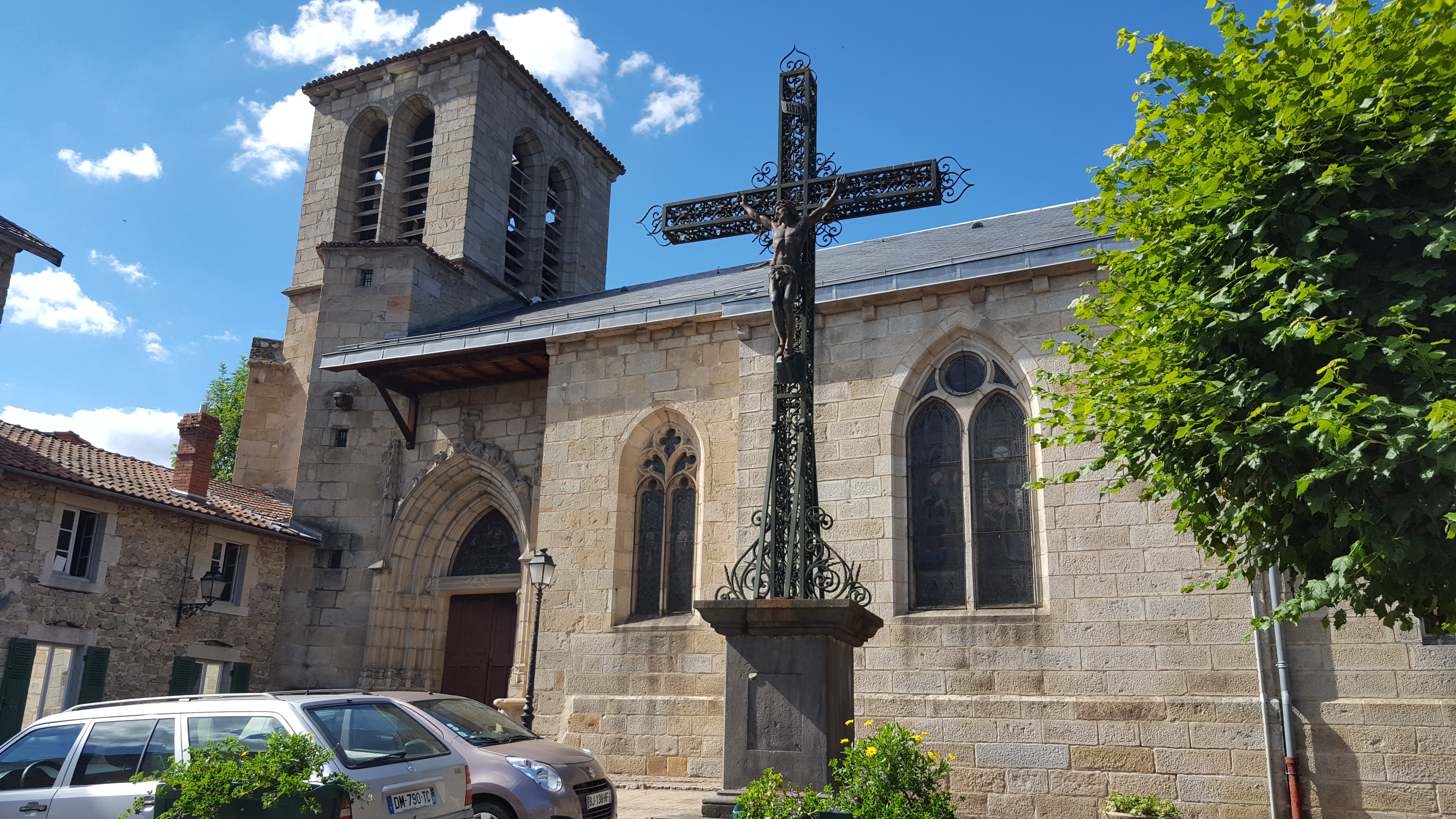
- The church in Vertolaye

- Coat of arms
- Location of Vertolaye
- Location within France Location within Auvergne-Rhône-Alpes
- Coordinates: 45°39′00″N 3°42′29″E
- Country: France
- Region: Auvergne-Rhône-Alpes
- Department: Puy-de-Dôme
- Arrondissement: Ambert
- Canton: Les Monts du Livradois
- Intercommunality: Ambert Livradois Forez

Government
  - Mayor (2026–32): Marc Menager
- Area^{1}: 10.76 km^{2} (4.15 sq mi)
- Elevation: 495 m (1,624 ft)
- Highest elevation: 1,363 m (4,472 ft)
- Lowest elevation: 486 m (1,594 ft)
- Population (2023): 562
  - Density: 52.2/km^{2} (135/sq mi)
- Time zone: UTC+01:00 (CET)
  - Summer (DST): UTC+02:00 (CEST)
- INSEE/Postal code: 63454 /63480
- ^{1} French Land Register data, which excludes lakes, ponds, glaciers > 1 km^{2} (0.386 sq mi or 247 acres) and river estuaries.

Vertolaye (French pronunciation: [vɛʁtɔlaj]; Occitan: Vertolalha) is a commune in the Puy-de-Dôme department in Auvergne in central France.

== See also ==
- Communes of the Puy-de-Dôme department
