= Tours-sur-Meymont =

- Commune
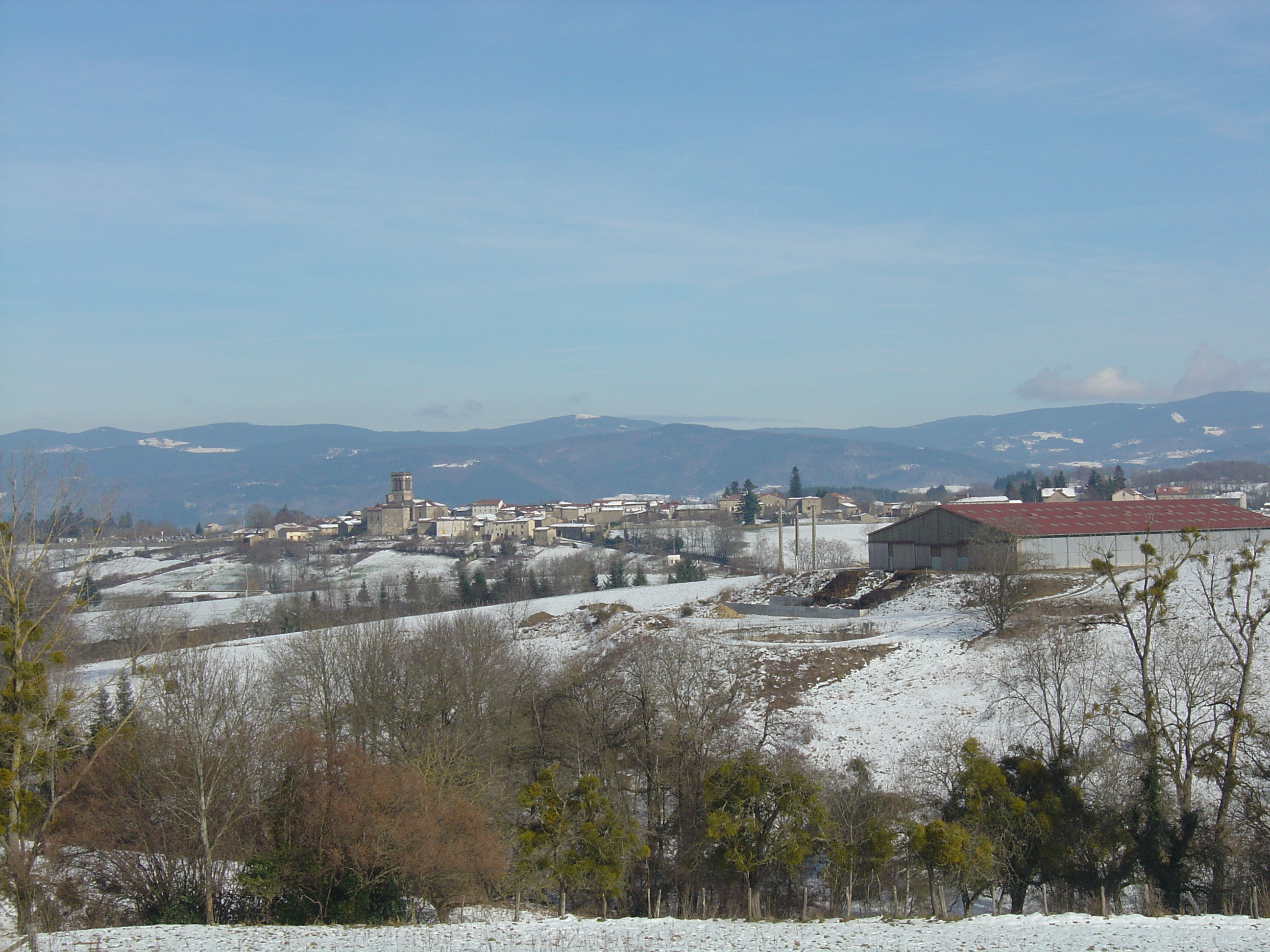
- A general view of Tours-sur-Meymont

- Coat of arms
- Location of Tours-sur-Meymont
- Location within France Location within Auvergne-Rhône-Alpes
- Coordinates: 45°40′19″N 3°34′34″E
- Country: France
- Region: Auvergne-Rhône-Alpes
- Department: Puy-de-Dôme
- Arrondissement: Ambert
- Canton: Les Monts du Livradois

Government
  - Mayor (2020–2026): Denis Combris
- Area^{1}: 18.09 km^{2} (6.98 sq mi)
- Elevation: 627 m (2,057 ft)
- Highest elevation: 823 m (2,700 ft)
- Lowest elevation: 360 m (1,180 ft)
- Population (2023): 542
  - Density: 30.0/km^{2} (77.6/sq mi)
- Time zone: UTC+01:00 (CET)
  - Summer (DST): UTC+02:00 (CEST)
- INSEE/Postal code: 63434 /63590
- ^{1} French Land Register data, which excludes lakes, ponds, glaciers > 1 km^{2} (0.386 sq mi or 247 acres) and river estuaries.

Tours-sur-Meymont (French pronunciation: [tuʁ syʁ memɔ̃]) is a commune in the Puy-de-Dôme department in Auvergne in central France.

== See also ==
- Communes of the Puy-de-Dôme department
