= Bertignat =

- Commune
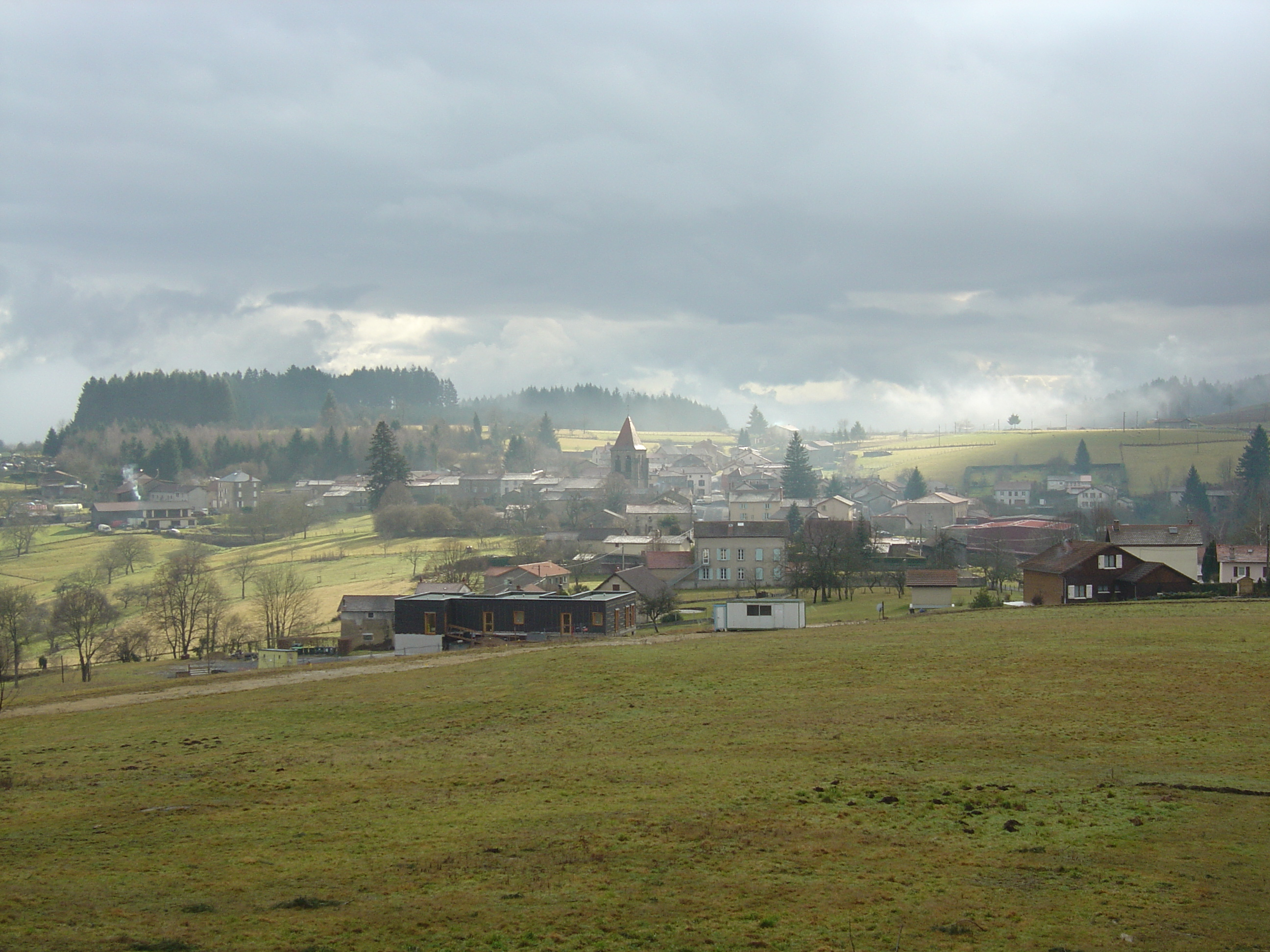
- A general view of Bertignat
- Location of Bertignat
- Location within France Location within Auvergne-Rhône-Alpes
- Coordinates: 45°37′07″N 3°40′54″E
- Country: France
- Region: Auvergne-Rhône-Alpes
- Department: Puy-de-Dôme
- Arrondissement: Ambert
- Canton: Les Monts du Livradois
- Intercommunality: Ambert Livradois Forez

Government
  - Mayor (2020–2026): Jacques Pouget
- Area^{1}: 24.31 km^{2} (9.39 sq mi)
- Elevation: 750 m (2,460 ft)
- Highest elevation: 911 m (2,989 ft)
- Lowest elevation: 470 m (1,540 ft)
- Population (2023): 483
  - Density: 19.9/km^{2} (51.5/sq mi)
- Time zone: UTC+01:00 (CET)
  - Summer (DST): UTC+02:00 (CEST)
- INSEE/Postal code: 63037 /63480
- ^{1} French Land Register data, which excludes lakes, ponds, glaciers > 1 km^{2} (0.386 sq mi or 247 acres) and river estuaries.

Bertignat (French pronunciation: [bɛʁtiɲa]; Occitan: Bartinhat or Bartinhac) is a commune in the Puy-de-Dôme department, region of Auvergne-Rhône-Alpes (formerly Auvergne), central France.

== Geography ==
The commune is bordered along its eastern and northern limits by the river Dore, tributary of the Allier.

== Localities ==
Babylone, le Bateau, les Batisses, Boisset, le Bost de Dore, Bourdelles, le Bourg, Boutonnargue, la Brugière, la Cambuse, le Chalet, Champandelay, le Chassagnon, le Chassaing, Chatelet, Chaussadis, les Claustres, la Collange Basse, le Champ, la Collange Haute, le Combas, le Combat, Conche, Conchette, la Côte de Sauvanis, la Croix du Bost de Dore, Dousson, Espinasse, la Faye, Flouvat, Fonlupt, le Fraisse, la Garde, la Goutte, Goutte-Clos, le Grand Bost, Grand Pré, la Grange, Lenteyras, Malfriat, Mariaux, Marioux, Meaux, le Mas, la Mayoux, Monteilhet, les Moulins, le Perrier, le Petit Bost, Pierre Grosse, Piessat, les Plaines, les Pommerettes, Pont de David (à cheval sur la commune de la Chapelle-Agnon), Pradis, le Prat, Pubrière, le Puy, Puybayou, la Ravanie, la Raze, les Rochades, la Roche, le Roule, le Rourre, Sagne Vert, Sauvanis, les Thuis,

== Administration ==
Since 2014, the Mayor has been Jacques Pouget.

== Population ==
Historical population
Year	Pop.	±% p.a.
1968	760	—
1975	649	−2.23%
1982	573	−1.76%
1990	552	−0.47%
1999	495	−1.20%
2007	487	−0.20%
2012	471	−0.67%
2017	455	−0.69%
2023	483	+1.00%
Source: INSEE

== Sights ==
The parish church was classified as a historic monument in 1987. Notable are: a wayside cross in stone from the sixteenth century; and stone alcove of baptismal fonts from the last quarter of the fifteenth century.

== See also ==
- Communes of the Puy-de-Dôme department
