= Sauviat =

- Commune
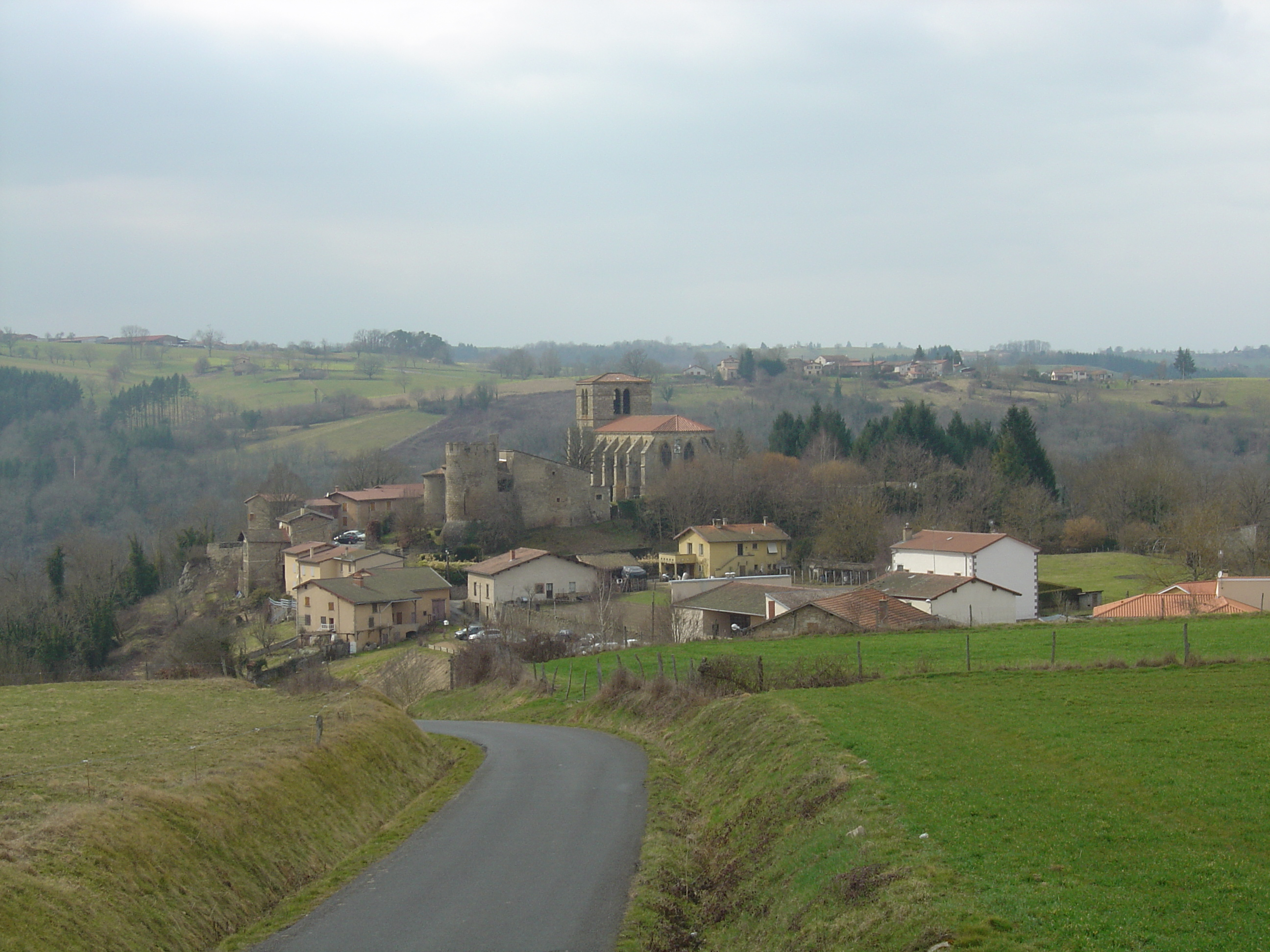
- A general view of Sauviat
- Location of Sauviat
- Location within France Location within Auvergne-Rhône-Alpes
- Coordinates: 45°42′58″N 3°33′00″E
- Country: France
- Region: Auvergne-Rhône-Alpes
- Department: Puy-de-Dôme
- Arrondissement: Thiers
- Canton: Les Monts du Livradois

Government
  - Mayor (2026–32): Rachel Bournier
- Area^{1}: 15.62 km^{2} (6.03 sq mi)
- Elevation: 420 m (1,380 ft)
- Highest elevation: 581 m (1,906 ft)
- Lowest elevation: 317 m (1,040 ft)
- Population (2023): 588
  - Density: 37.6/km^{2} (97.5/sq mi)
- Time zone: UTC+01:00 (CET)
  - Summer (DST): UTC+02:00 (CEST)
- INSEE/Postal code: 63414 /63120
- ^{1} French Land Register data, which excludes lakes, ponds, glaciers > 1 km^{2} (0.386 sq mi or 247 acres) and river estuaries.

Sauviat (French pronunciation: [sovja]; Occitan: Sauviac) is a commune in the Puy-de-Dôme department in Auvergne in central France.

== See also ==
- Communes of the Puy-de-Dôme department
