= Condat-lès-Montboissier =

- Commune
- Coat of arms
- Location of Condat-lès-Montboissier
- Location within France Location within Auvergne-Rhône-Alpes
- Coordinates: 45°33′05″N 3°30′02″E
- Country: France
- Region: Auvergne-Rhône-Alpes
- Department: Puy-de-Dôme
- Arrondissement: Ambert
- Canton: Les Monts du Livradois
- Intercommunality: Ambert Livradois Forez

Government
  - Mayor (2026–32): Corinne Delair
- Area^{1}: 20.52 km^{2} (7.92 sq mi)
- Highest elevation: 880 m (2,890 ft)
- Lowest elevation: 591 m (1,939 ft)
- Population (2023): 228
  - Density: 11.1/km^{2} (28.8/sq mi)
- Time zone: UTC+01:00 (CET)
  - Summer (DST): UTC+02:00 (CEST)
- INSEE/Postal code: 63119 /63490
- ^{1} French Land Register data, which excludes lakes, ponds, glaciers > 1 km^{2} (0.386 sq mi or 247 acres) and river estuaries.

Condat-lès-Montboissier (French pronunciation: [kɔ̃da lɛ mɔ̃bwasje]; Occitan: Condat) is a commune in the Puy-de-Dôme department in Auvergne-Rhône-Alpes in central France.

== See also ==
- Communes of the Puy-de-Dôme department
