= Canton of Les Monts du Livradois =

Coordinates: 45.76°N 3.54°E

The canton of Les Monts du Livradois is an administrative division of the Puy-de-Dôme department, central France. It was created at the French canton reorganisation which came into effect in March 2015. Its seat is in Courpière.

It consists of the following communes:

1. Aix-la-Fayette
2. Aubusson-d'Auvergne
3. Augerolles
4. Auzelles
5. Bertignat
6. Brousse
7. Le Brugeron
8. Ceilloux
9. Chambon-sur-Dolore
10. La Chapelle-Agnon
11. Condat-lès-Montboissier
12. Courpière
13. Cunlhat
14. Domaize
15. Échandelys
16. Fayet-Ronaye
17. Fournols
18. Grandval
19. Marat
20. Le Monestier
21. Néronde-sur-Dore
22. Olmet
23. Olliergues
24. La Renaudie
25. Saint-Amant-Roche-Savine
26. Saint-Bonnet-le-Bourg
27. Saint-Bonnet-le-Chastel
28. Sainte-Catherine
29. Saint-Éloy-la-Glacière
30. Saint-Flour-l'Étang
31. Saint-Germain-l'Herm
32. Saint-Gervais-sous-Meymont
33. Saint-Pierre-la-Bourlhonne
34. Sauviat
35. Sermentizon
36. Tours-sur-Meymont
37. Vertolaye
38. Vollore-Ville
