= Saint-Bonnet-le-Bourg =

- Commune
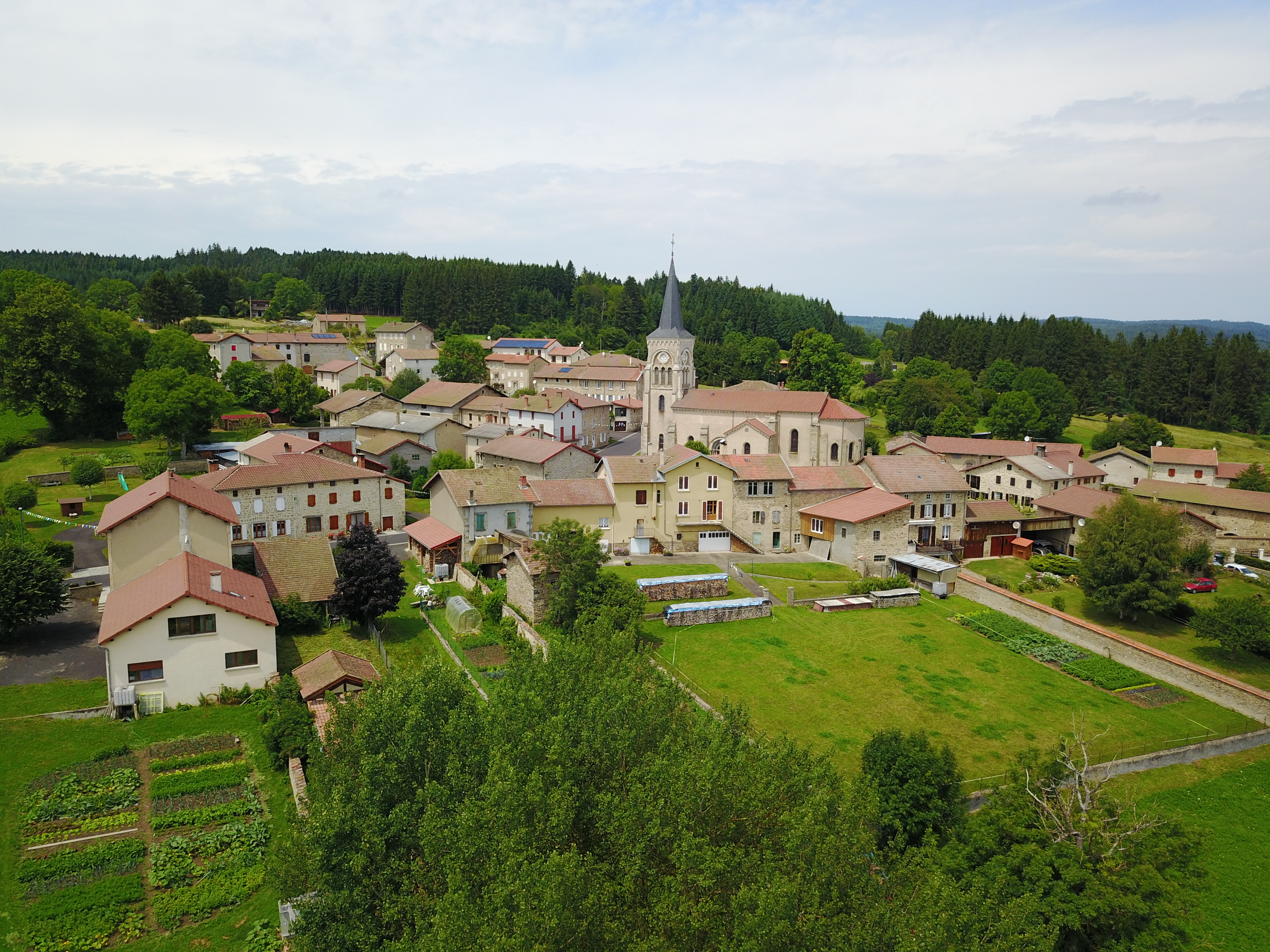
- A general view of Saint-Bonnet-le-Bourg

- Coat of arms
- Location of Saint-Bonnet-le-Bourg
- Location within France Location within Auvergne-Rhône-Alpes
- Coordinates: 45°26′N 3°36′E
- Country: France
- Region: Auvergne-Rhône-Alpes
- Department: Puy-de-Dôme
- Arrondissement: Ambert
- Canton: Les Monts du Livradois

Government
  - Mayor (2026–32): Véronique Hauville
- Area^{1}: 20.04 km^{2} (7.74 sq mi)
- Elevation: 950 m (3,120 ft)
- Highest elevation: 1,145 m (3,757 ft)
- Lowest elevation: 836 m (2,743 ft)
- Population (2023): 186
  - Density: 9.28/km^{2} (24.0/sq mi)
- Time zone: UTC+01:00 (CET)
  - Summer (DST): UTC+02:00 (CEST)
- INSEE/Postal code: 63323 /63630
- ^{1} French Land Register data, which excludes lakes, ponds, glaciers > 1 km^{2} (0.386 sq mi or 247 acres) and river estuaries.

Saint-Bonnet-le-Bourg (French pronunciation: [sɛ̃ bɔnɛ lə buʁ]; Auvergnat: Sent Bonet lo Borg) is a commune in the Puy-de-Dôme department in Auvergne in central France.

== See also ==
- Communes of the Puy-de-Dôme department
