= Grandval, Puy-de-Dôme =

Grandval
- Commune
- Location of Grandval
- Location within France Location within Auvergne-Rhône-Alpes
- Coordinates: 45°35′57″N 3°38′48″E
- Country: France
- Region: Auvergne-Rhône-Alpes
- Department: Puy-de-Dôme
- Arrondissement: Ambert
- Canton: Les Monts du Livradois

Government
  - Mayor (2026–32): Didier Fourt
- Area^{1}: 9.83 km^{2} (3.80 sq mi)
- Elevation: 780 m (2,560 ft)
- Highest elevation: 1,048 m (3,438 ft)
- Lowest elevation: 635 m (2,083 ft)
- Population (2023): 123
  - Density: 12.5/km^{2} (32.4/sq mi)
- Time zone: UTC+01:00 (CET)
  - Summer (DST): UTC+02:00 (CEST)
- INSEE/Postal code: 63174 /63890
- ^{1} French Land Register data, which excludes lakes, ponds, glaciers > 1 km^{2} (0.386 sq mi or 247 acres) and river estuaries.

Grandval (French pronunciation: [ɡʁɑ̃val]; Occitan: Grandvau) is a commune in the Puy-de-Dôme department in Auvergne in central France.

== See also ==
- Communes of the Puy-de-Dôme department
