= Courpière =

- Commune
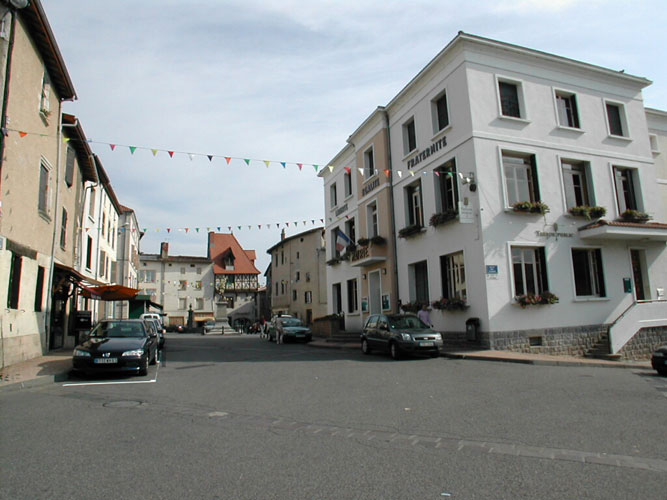
- A general view of Courpière

- Coat of arms
- Location of Courpière
- Location within France Location within Auvergne-Rhône-Alpes
- Coordinates: 45°45′21″N 3°32′19″E
- Country: France
- Region: Auvergne-Rhône-Alpes
- Department: Puy-de-Dôme
- Arrondissement: Thiers
- Canton: Les Monts du Livradois
- Intercommunality: CC Thiers Dore et Montagne

Government
  - Mayor (2026–32): Laurent Clivillé
- Area^{1}: 31.82 km^{2} (12.29 sq mi)
- Elevation: 331 m (1,086 ft)
- Highest elevation: 542 m (1,778 ft)
- Lowest elevation: 297 m (974 ft)
- Population (2023): 4,166
  - Density: 130.9/km^{2} (339.1/sq mi)
- Time zone: UTC+01:00 (CET)
  - Summer (DST): UTC+02:00 (CEST)
- INSEE/Postal code: 63125 /63120
- ^{1} French Land Register data, which excludes lakes, ponds, glaciers > 1 km^{2} (0.386 sq mi or 247 acres) and river estuaries.

Courpière (French pronunciation: [kuʁpjɛʁ]; Auvergnat: Corpèira) is a commune in the Puy-de-Dôme department in Auvergne-Rhône-Alpes in central France.

== Population ==
Historical population
Year	Pop.	±% p.a.
1968	3,913	—
1975	4,338	+1.48%
1982	4,834	+1.56%
1990	4,674	−0.42%
1999	4,612	−0.15%
2007	4,521	−0.25%
2012	4,341	−0.81%
2017	4,050	−1.38%
2023	4,166	+0.47%
Source: INSEE

== Tour de France cycle race ==
Courpiere was on the stage 14 route of the 2020 Tour de France

== See also ==
- Communes of the Puy-de-Dôme department
