= Aubusson-d'Auvergne =

- Commune
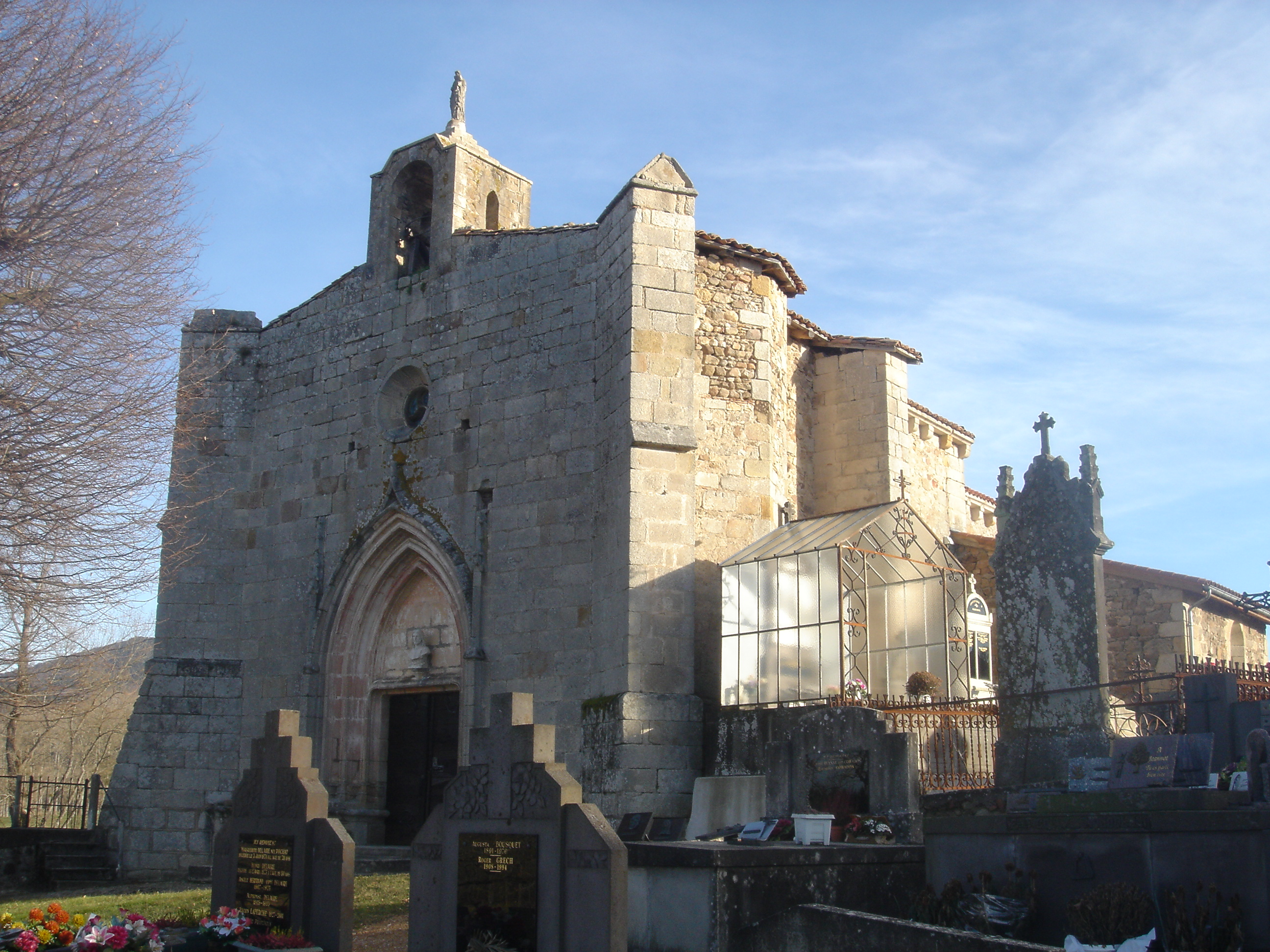
- The church in Aubusson-d'Auvergne
- Location of Aubusson-d'Auvergne
- Location within France Location within Auvergne-Rhône-Alpes
- Coordinates: 45°45′22″N 3°37′09″E
- Country: France
- Region: Auvergne-Rhône-Alpes
- Department: Puy-de-Dôme
- Arrondissement: Thiers
- Canton: Les Monts du Livradois
- Intercommunality: Thiers Dore et Montagne

Government
  - Mayor (2026–32): Bernard Lorton
- Area^{1}: 6.79 km^{2} (2.62 sq mi)
- Elevation: 418 m (1,371 ft)
- Highest elevation: 609 m (1,998 ft)
- Lowest elevation: 355 m (1,165 ft)
- Population (2023): 215
  - Density: 31.7/km^{2} (82.0/sq mi)
- Time zone: UTC+01:00 (CET)
  - Summer (DST): UTC+02:00 (CEST)
- INSEE/Postal code: 63015 /63120
- ^{1} French Land Register data, which excludes lakes, ponds, glaciers > 1 km^{2} (0.386 sq mi or 247 acres) and river estuaries.

Aubusson-d'Auvergne (French pronunciation: [obysɔ̃ dovɛʁɲ]) is a commune in the Puy-de-Dôme department in Auvergne-Rhône-Alpes in central France.

== Population ==
Historical population

Year	Pop.	±% p.a.
1876	708	—
1962	278	−1.08%
1968	242	−2.28%
1975	221	−1.29%
1982	194	−1.84%
1990	191	−0.19%

Year	Pop.	±% p.a.
1999	220	+1.58%
2007	221	+0.06%
2012	237	+1.41%
2017	261	+1.95%
2023	215	−3.18%

Source: EHESS and INSEE

== See also ==
- Communes of the Puy-de-Dôme department
