= Fayet-Ronaye =

- Commune
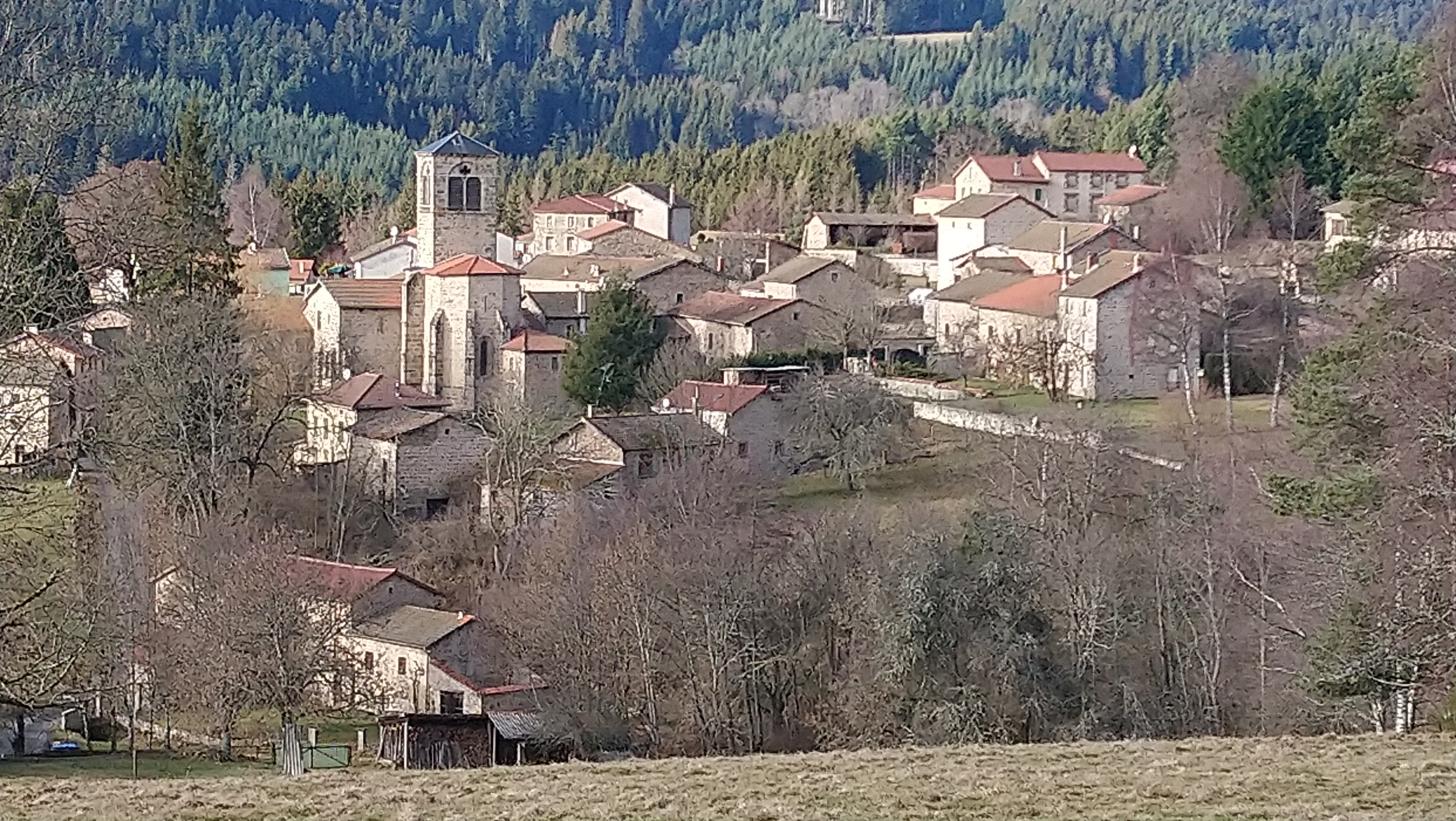
- A general view of Fayet-Ronaye
- Location of Fayet-Ronaye
- Location within France Location within Auvergne-Rhône-Alpes
- Coordinates: 45°25′34″N 3°32′12″E
- Country: France
- Region: Auvergne-Rhône-Alpes
- Department: Puy-de-Dôme
- Arrondissement: Ambert
- Canton: Les Monts du Livradois
- Intercommunality: Ambert Livradois Forez

Government
  - Mayor (2026–32): Patrick Hervouët
- Area^{1}: 20.25 km^{2} (7.82 sq mi)
- Elevation: 1,000 m (3,300 ft)
- Highest elevation: 1,145 m (3,757 ft)
- Lowest elevation: 823 m (2,700 ft)
- Population (2023): 116
  - Density: 5.73/km^{2} (14.8/sq mi)
- Time zone: UTC+01:00 (CET)
  - Summer (DST): UTC+02:00 (CEST)
- INSEE/Postal code: 63158 /63630
- Website: Association de Fayet-Ronaye
- ^{1} French Land Register data, which excludes lakes, ponds, glaciers > 1 km^{2} (0.386 sq mi or 247 acres) and river estuaries.

Fayet-Ronaye is a commune in the Puy-de-Dôme department in Auvergne in central France.

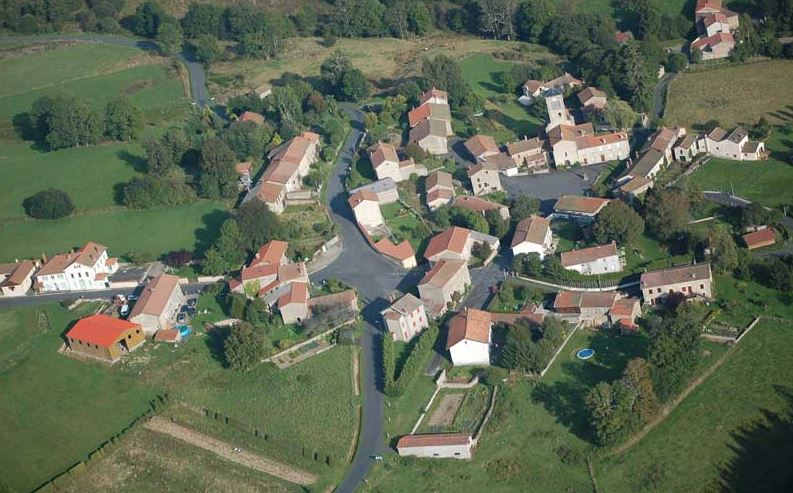
Fayet-Ronaye, le bourg de Fayet

== History ==
Initially, Ronaye and Fayet were two separate villages, hence the presence of a church in both of them. They used to belong to the family of Grellet de la Deyte in XVIII century. Benoît Grellet de la Deyte was seigneur of Saint-Quentin (in the Somme Department)and of Fayet-Ronaye. Feudal remains (presumably, ruins of the family castle of Grellet de la Deyte) are situated between Frissonet, one of the hamlets of Fayet-Ronaye, and Saint-Germain-l'Herm.

== Historical monuments ==
=== Dissard's tumulus ===
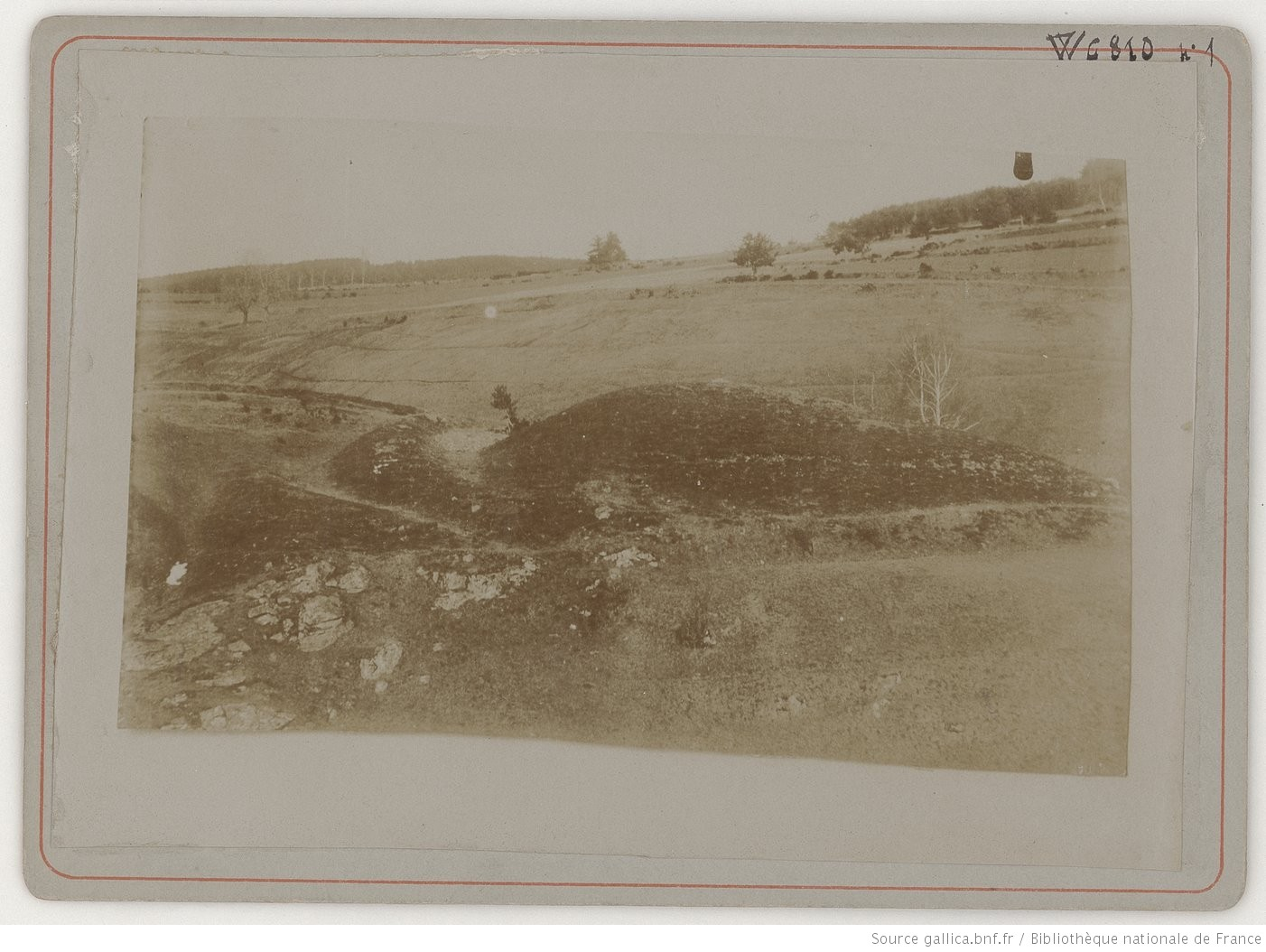
The druidic mound

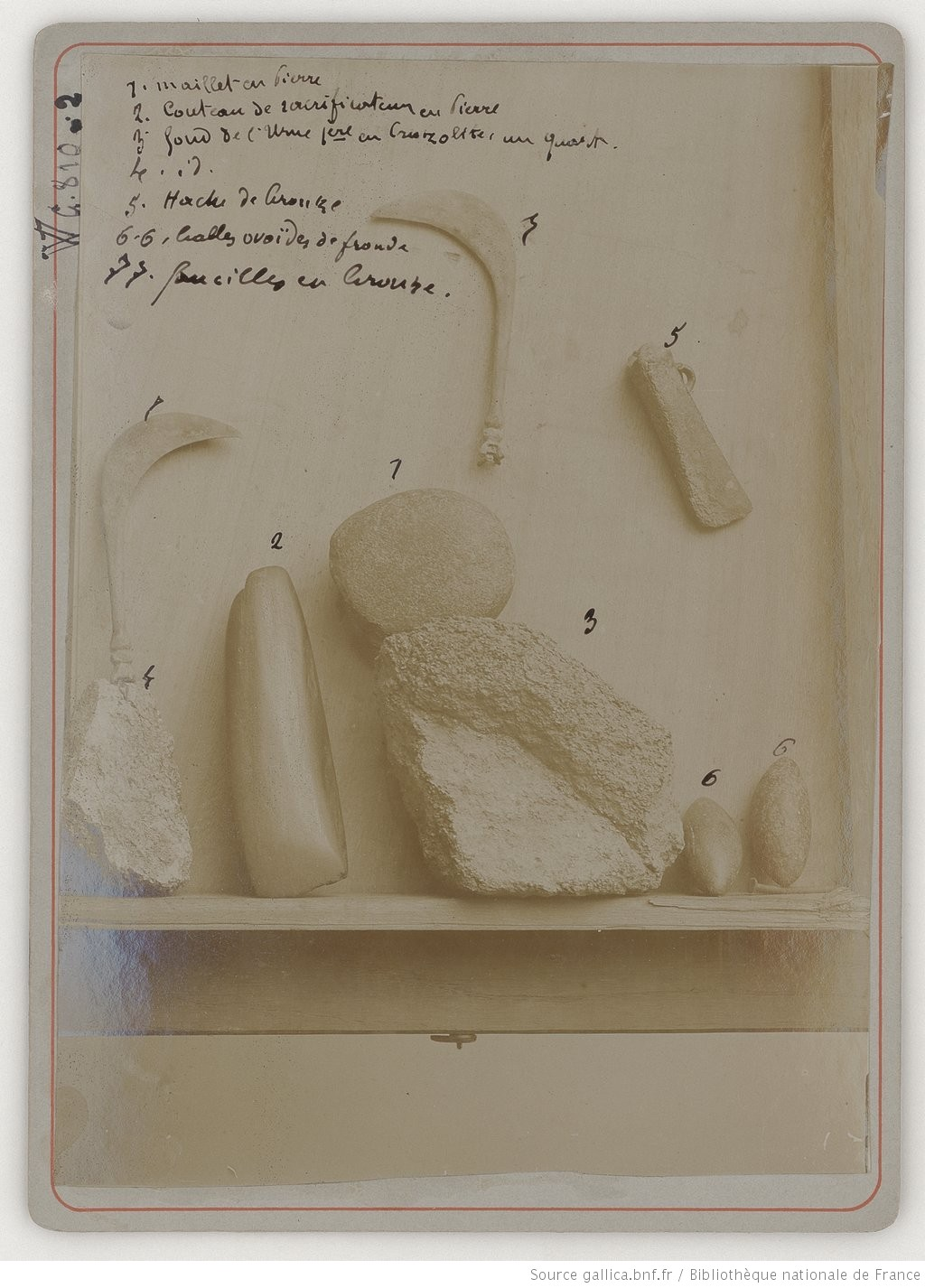
archeological finds 1901

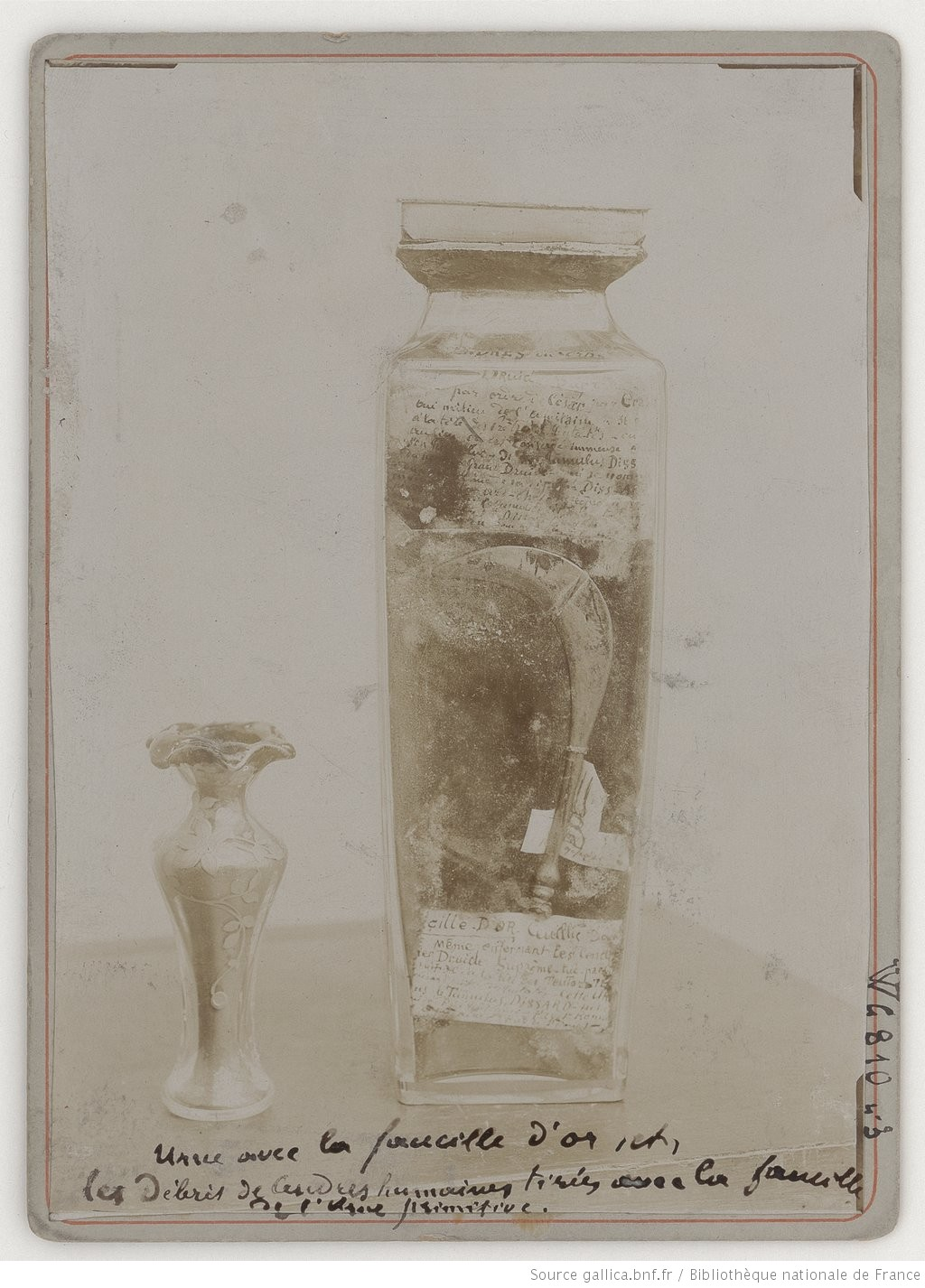

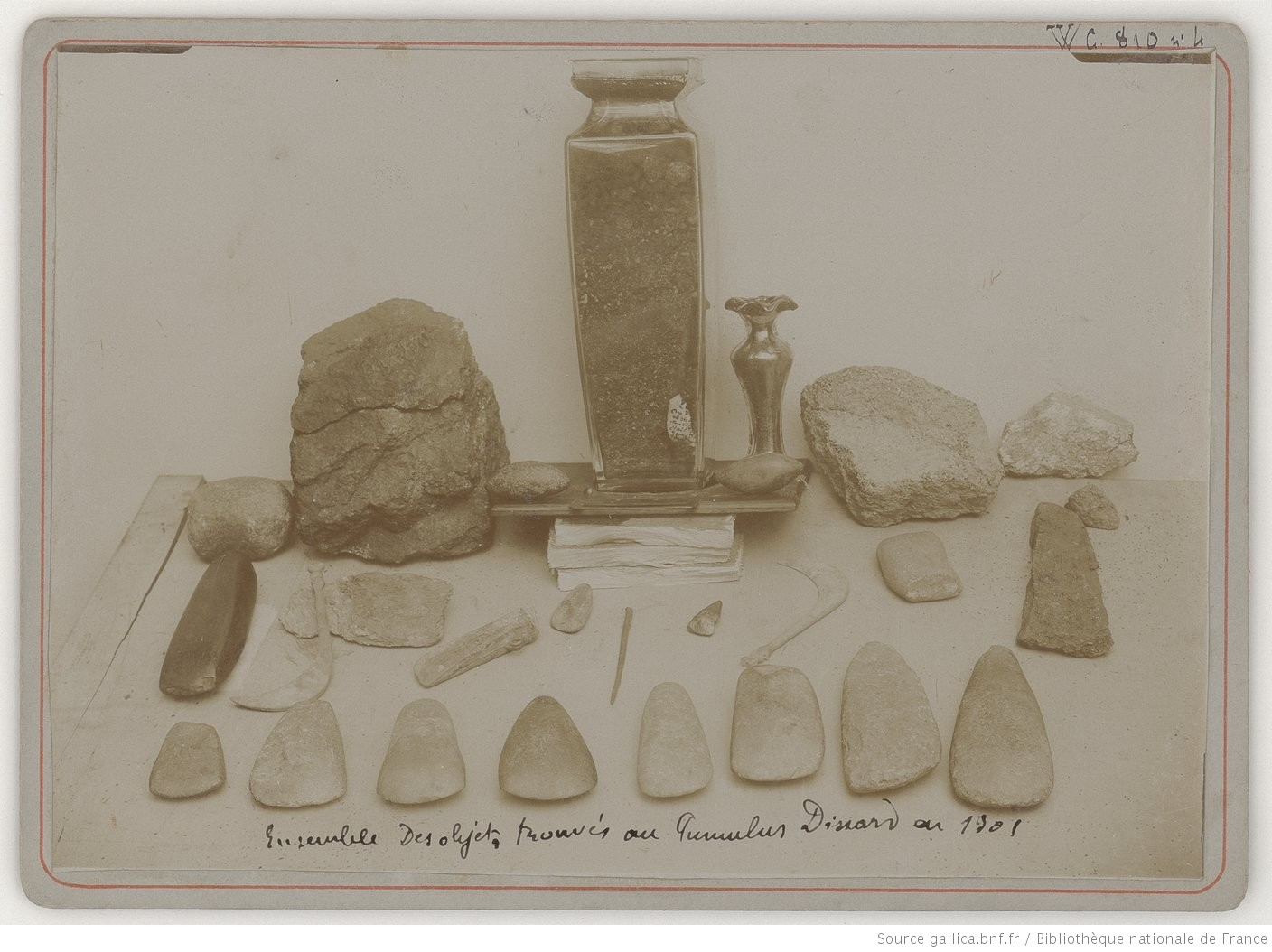

According to the researcher Coste ("Supplément au monument druidique de Tuniac"), a burial mound, known as the Dissard's tumulus, located 1 km south away from the center of the village, contained the rests of the druidic chef and his Celtic supporters chased by the army of Marcus Licinius Crassus. The site had been a high place of veneration for the locals. Other researchers argue that the whole legend is a fake.

=== Cromlech of Frissonnet ===
Situated between Fayet and Saint-Germain-l'Herm, the Cromlech of Frissonnet represents a square formed with megalithic standing stones.

=== Runiac's feudal remains ===
The remains are situated near Frissonnet. Jean Olléon presumes it might be the remains of the family castle of Grellet de la Deyte.

== See also ==
- Communes of the Puy-de-Dôme department
