= Olmet =

- Commune
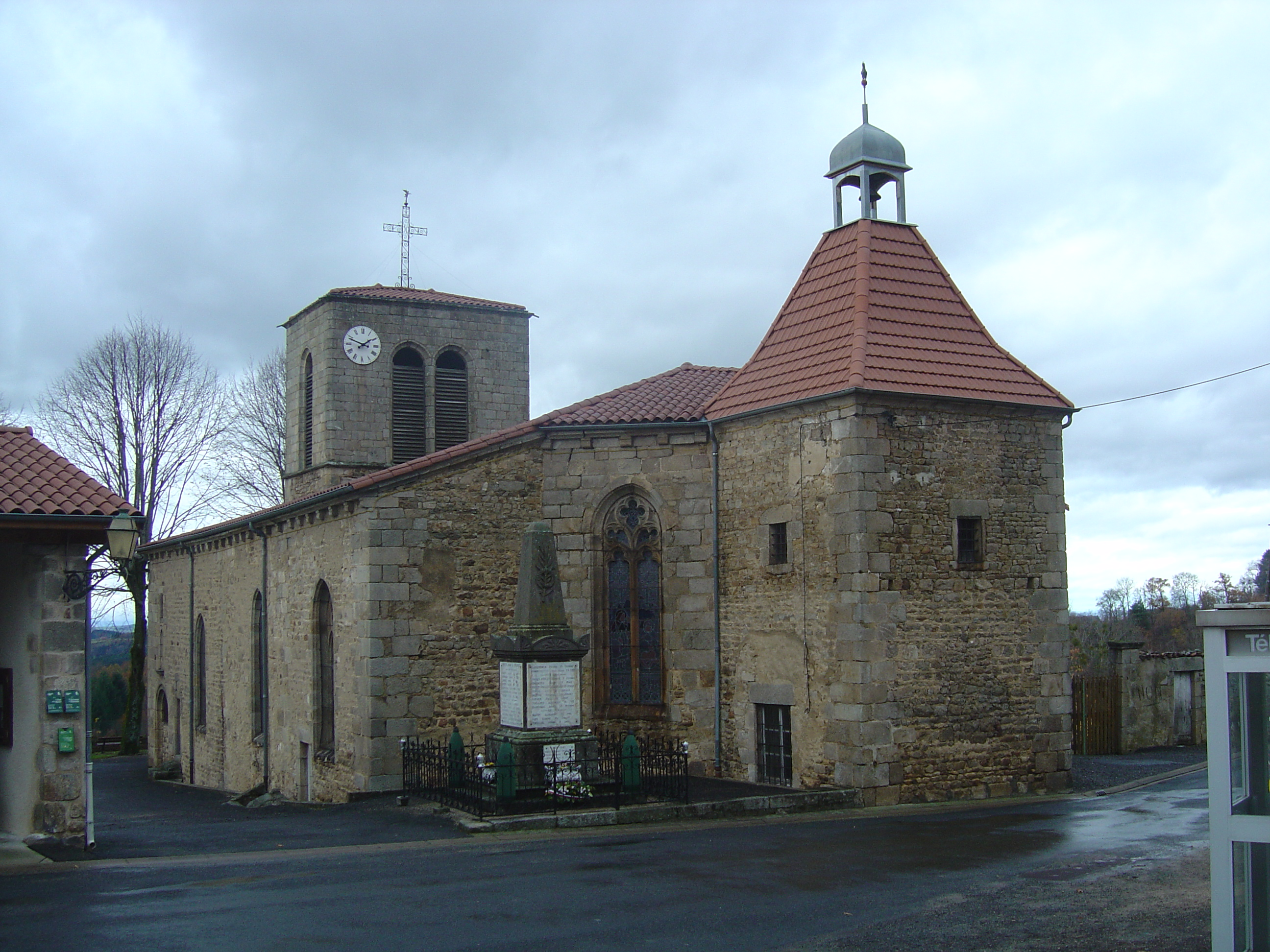
- The church in Olmet
- Location of Olmet
- Location within France Location within Auvergne-Rhône-Alpes
- Coordinates: 45°42′36″N 3°39′43″E
- Country: France
- Region: Auvergne-Rhône-Alpes
- Department: Puy-de-Dôme
- Arrondissement: Thiers
- Canton: Les Monts du Livradois

Government
  - Mayor (2020–2026): Jany Brousse
- Area^{1}: 15.54 km^{2} (6.00 sq mi)
- Elevation: 675 m (2,215 ft)
- Highest elevation: 954 m (3,130 ft)
- Lowest elevation: 433 m (1,421 ft)
- Population (2023): 192
  - Density: 12.4/km^{2} (32.0/sq mi)
- Time zone: UTC+01:00 (CET)
  - Summer (DST): UTC+02:00 (CEST)
- INSEE/Postal code: 63260 /63880
- ^{1} French Land Register data, which excludes lakes, ponds, glaciers > 1 km^{2} (0.386 sq mi or 247 acres) and river estuaries.

Olmet (French pronunciation: [ɔlmɛ]) is a commune in the Puy-de-Dôme department in Auvergne in central France.

== See also ==
- Communes of the Cantal department
