= Livradois-Forez Regional Natural Park =

Regional natural park in France

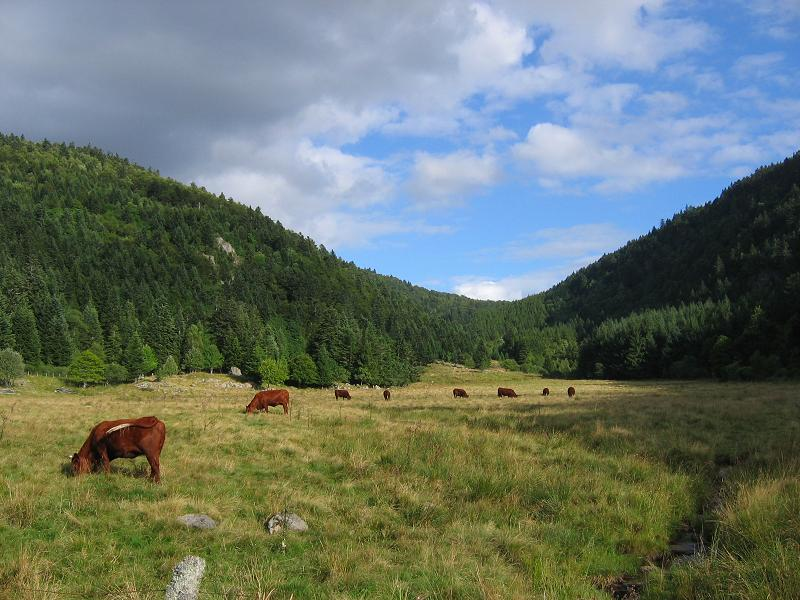
- Glacial valley of the Fossat
- Interactive map of Livradois-Forez Regional Natural Park
- Location: Puy-de-Dôme, Haute-Loire, Loire; Auvergne-Rhône-Alpes; France
- Coordinates: 45.603°N 3.55°E
- Established: 1986
- Governing body: Fédération des parcs naturels régionaux de France
- Website: http://www.parc-livradois-forez.org/

Livradois-Forez Regional Natural Park (French: Parc naturel régional Livradois-Forez, pronounced [paʁk natyʁɛl ʁeʒjɔnal livʁadwa fɔʁɛ]) is a regional natural park located on three French department : Puy-de-Dôme, Haute-Loire and Loire. The two biggest urban areas are Thiers (19,000 inhabitants) and Ambert (11,000 inhabitants). Courpière, Billom and Vic-le-Comte have a secondary place in the territory.

== Presentation ==
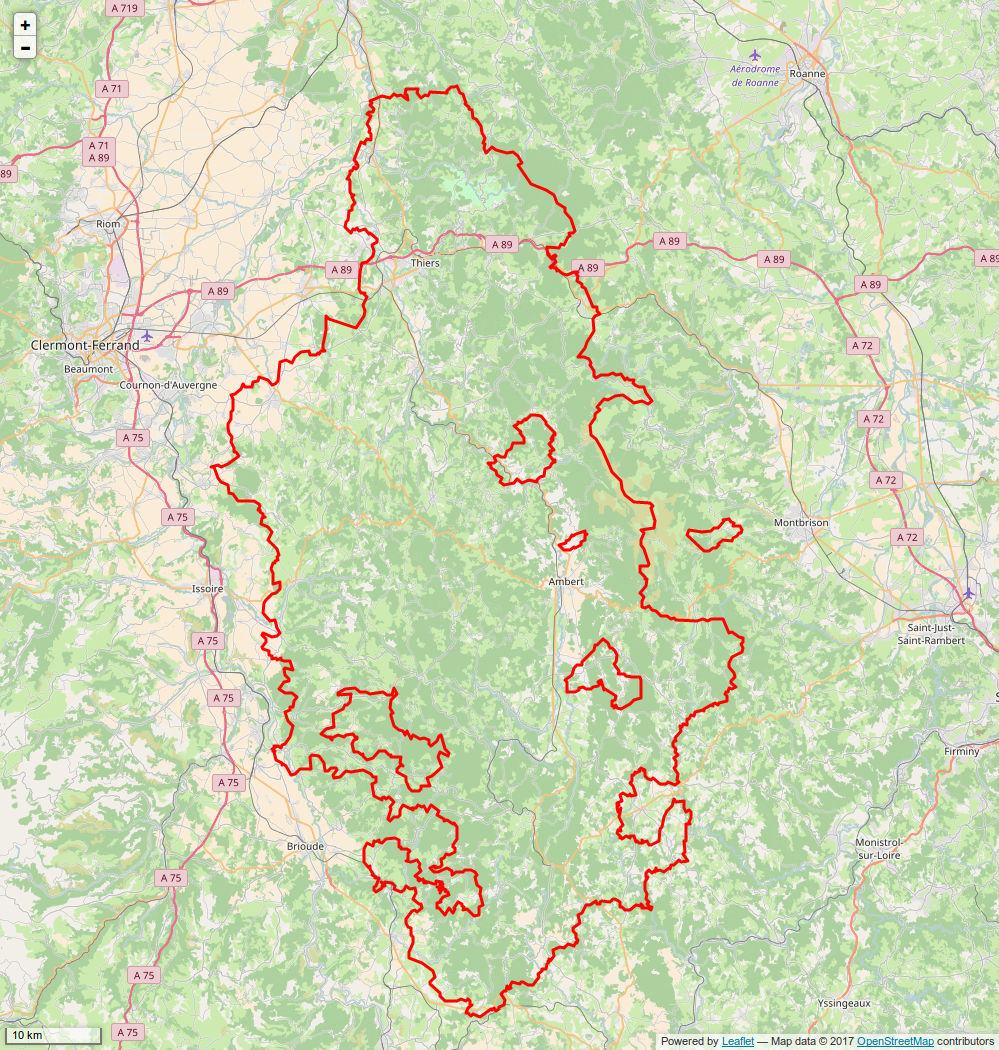
Perimeter of the PNR in 2016.

The park is managed by several structures on a cooperation basis. There is the Auvergne-Rhône-Alpes region, Puy-de-Dôme, Haute-Loire and Loire's departments, by 24 EPCI (French: Établissements publics de coopération intercommunale, which are Public institutions of intercommunal cooperation) and also by 164 towns certified parc naturel régional (Regional natural park). Since March 2008, Tony Bernard, Châteldon's mayor, presides the park. The certified zone of the park covers an area of 311,035 hectares. Its population is of 103 948 inhabitants.

== History and creation of the park ==
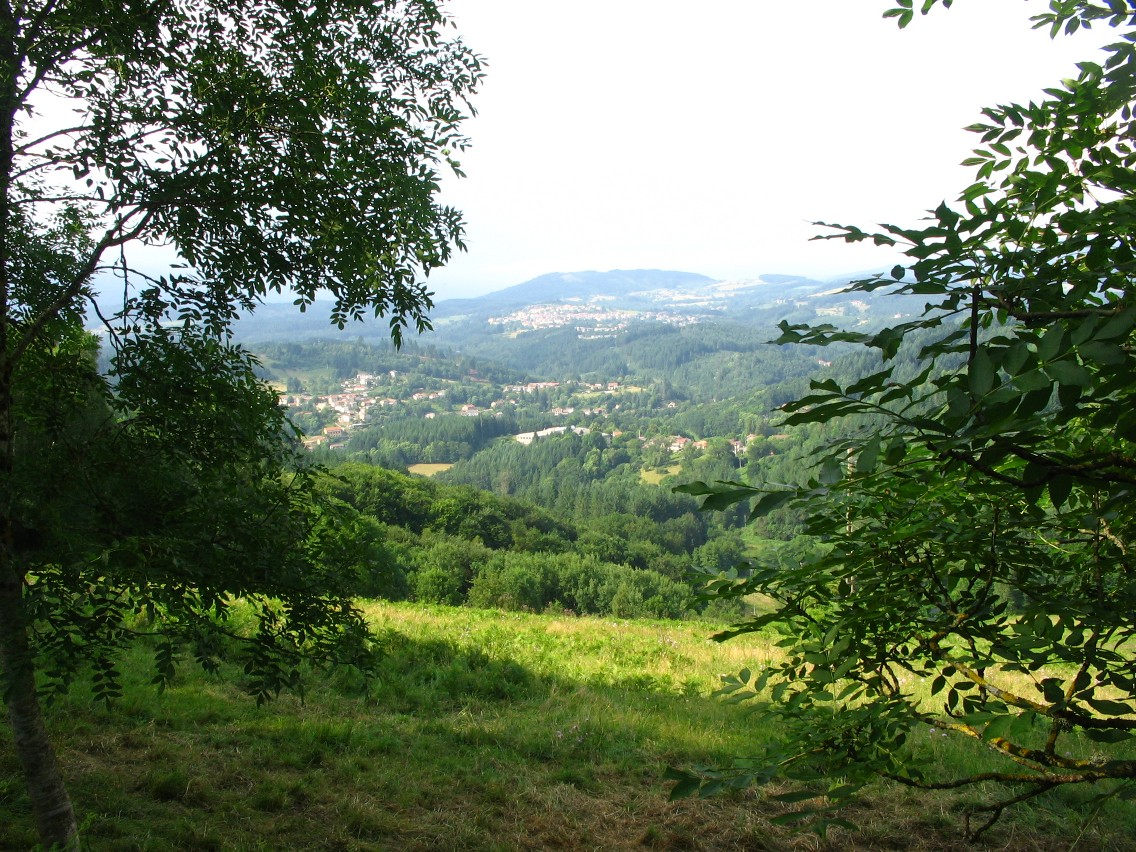
Villages of the Durolle valley

- Under the presidency of Maurice Adevah-Pœuf, Thier's mayor and deputy of Puy-de-Dôme, an association for the creation of the Livradois-Forez Regional Natural Park is established in April 1982 at the suggestion of seventeen elected reunited 29 November 1981 in Brugeron.
- In 1984 is created the management mixed union of the Livradois-Forez Park.
- The environment ministry assigned its label in December 1985.
- The Livradois-Forez Regional Natural Park was created on 4 February 1986 by deliberation of the Auvergne regional council.
- Its constitutive charter was re-examined two times, so the label was assigned again in 1998; an extension decree of the Regional Natural Park for the next twelve years was published in Journal Officiel (French government website) on 27 July 2011. On the occasion of this latest review, five municipalities of Loire's department joined for the first time the park : Noirétable, La Chamba, La Chambonie, Jeansagnière et Lérigneux.

Its headquarters, originally in Thiers, is now located in the municipality named Saint-Gervais-sous-Meymont.

== Geography ==
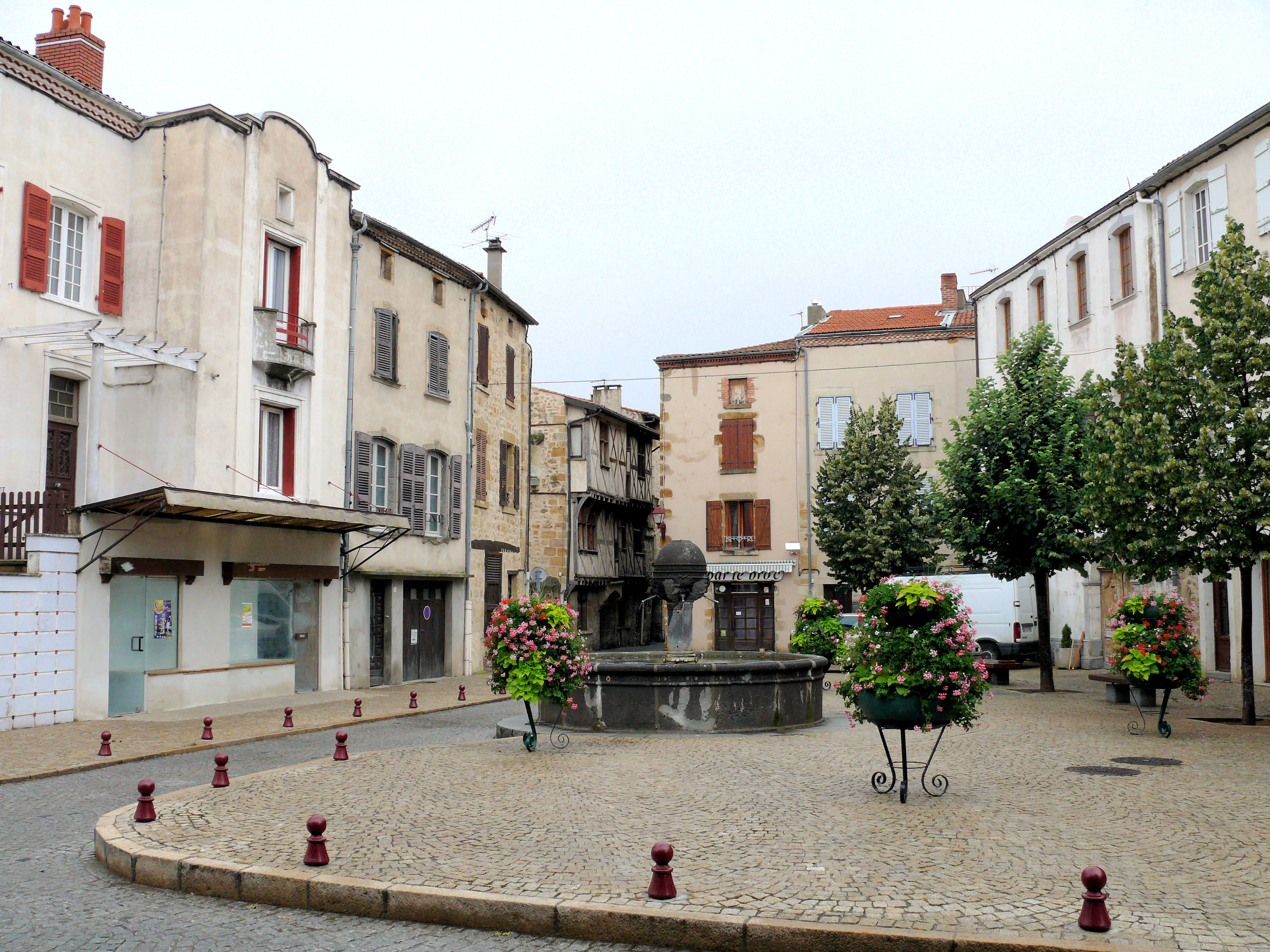
Vic-le-Comte – Place of the old market

Located between the old Auvergne and Rhône-Alpes regions, the park extends 110 km from north to south, in three departments (Puy-de-Dôme, Allier and Haute-Loire). It's composed of 176 municipalities gathering 103,172 inhabitants in 2014.

The highest point of the park (1634 m) corresponds to the highest point of the Forez mountains and is located at Pierre-sur-Haute, within the territory of the municipality of Job, in the Puy-de-Dôme department.

Some big geographic zones:

- the valley of factories in Thiers's municipality (in the North of the park);
- the valley of the Dore, which constitutes a sort of backbone of the park;
- the mountains of the Forez with upland plateaus covered with highland moors called Hautes Chaumes;
- Craponne's plateau;
- the countries cut off from Livradois;
- Livradois's mountains, including the high forest plateaus;
- hills and hillsides of the county around Vic-le-Comte and Billom's region

== Demography ==
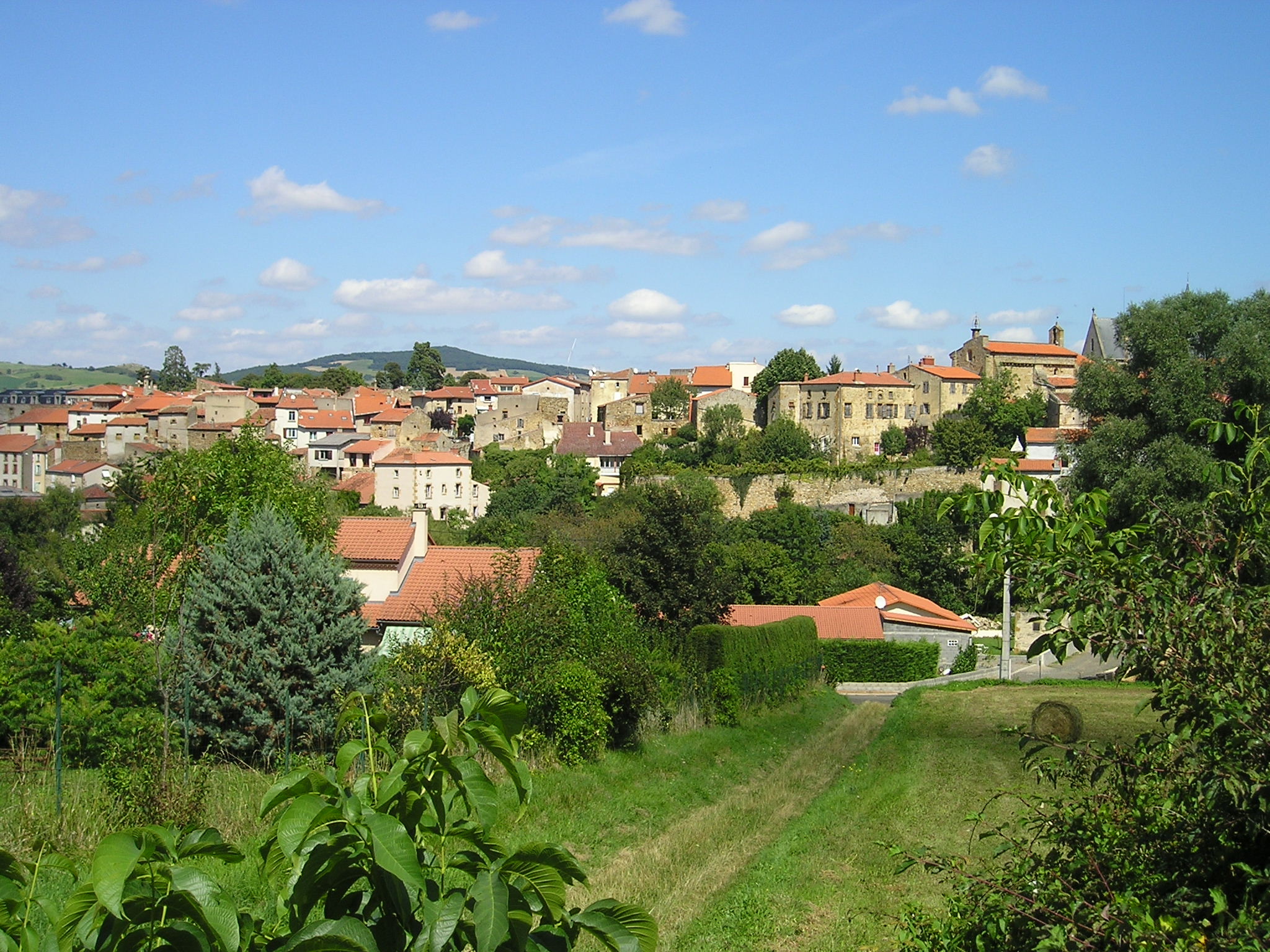
Vic-le-Comte (Puy-de-Dôme)

List of the biggest cities of the park on 1 January 2015
commune	number of inhabitants
Thiers	11 805 ▲
Ambert	6 743 ▼
Vic-le-Comte (commune associée)	5 027 ▲
Billom	4 745 ▲
Courpière	4 234 ▼
Puy-Guillaume	2 704 ▲
Peschadoires	2 120 ▲
La Monnerie-le-Montel	1 772 ▼
Saint-Rémy-sur-Durolle	1 757 ▼
Celles-sur-Durolle	1 749 ▼
Noirétable	1 611 ▼

The park is constituted of two major cities, Thiers and Ambert. There are other urban areas but less important. The majority of the biggest cities in the park tend to see its population decrease. Meanwhile, Thiers the biggest city of the park, increase.

== Fauna ==
One can find various raptors in the Livradois-Forez regional natural park : pigeons, hawk, circaete Jean-le-Blanc, red kite, buzzard, harrier Saint-Martin, gray buzzard, tengmalm owl, little owl, etc. The Black woodpecker and the Ring ouzel can also be seen in the park.

== Publications ==
Apart from its punctual participation as a supporter, editor of numerous books (historics, etc.) published by various editors of the region, the Park released a twice yearly 8 page magazine, Journal du Parc naturel régional Livradois-Forez, which contents are linked to the environment protection, social life, traditions and culture.

== Films shot in the Livradois-Forez Regional Natural ==
=== Before the creation of the parc ===
- 1965 : Les Copains a French film directed by Yves Robert
- 1976 : L'argent de poche a French film directed by François Truffaut in Thiers

=== Since the creation of the parc ===
- 1990 : Uranus a French film directed by Claude Berri
- 1993 : Le Chasseur de la Nuit a French film directed by Jacques Renard
- 1995 : Le Garçu a French film directed by Maurice Pialat
- 2002 : Être et avoir a French documentary directed by Nicolas Philibert
- 2004 : Les Choristes a French film directed by Christophe Barratier
- 2007 : Le Piano oublié a French film directed by Henri Helman

== See also ==
- Pierre-sur-Haute
