= Joseph Vacher =

French serial killer (1869–1898)

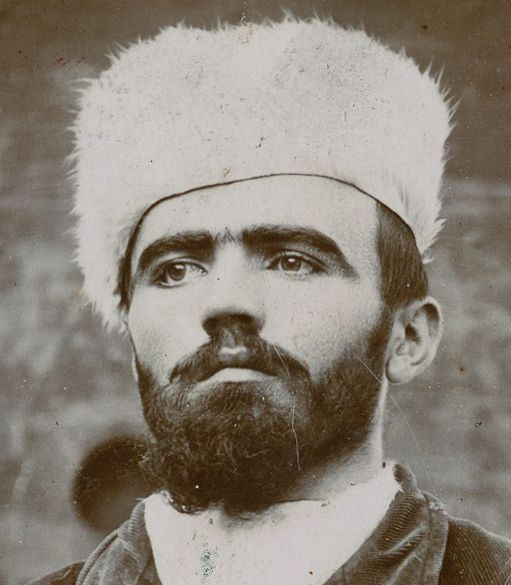
- Vacher c. 1897
- Born: 16 November 1869; Beaufort, Isère, France
- Died: 31 December 1898 (aged 29); Bourg-en-Bresse, Ain, France
- Cause of death: Execution by guillotine
- Other names: The French Ripper; The South-East Ripper
- Conviction: Murder
- Penalty: Death

Details
- Victims: 11–50
- Span of crimes: 1894–1897
- Country: France
- Date apprehended: 4 August 1897

Joseph Vacher (16 November 1869 – 31 December 1898) was a French serial killer, rapist, and necrophile who killed between 11 and 50 people, many of them adolescent farm workers, between 1894 and 1897. He was contemporarily called "le tueur de bergers" ("the killer of shepherds"), but upon his capture became more commonly known as "The French Ripper" or "L'éventreur du Sud-Est" ("The South-East Ripper"), owing to comparisons to the more famous Jack the Ripper murderer of London, England, in 1888. Vacher's scarred face and plain, white, handmade rabbit-fur hat composed his trademark appearance.

== Early life ==
=== Family ===
Vacher was born as the second youngest of 16 children to illiterate farmer Pierre Vacher (1810–1889), in Pierre's hometown of Beaufort, a commune 5 kilometers from Beaurepaire and 60 kilometers from Grenoble. Joseph's mother, Marie Rose "Rosalie" Ravit (1825–1882) from Lentiol, was Pierre's second wife after his first wife Virginie Didier, mother of four of Joseph's siblings, died in 1849, aged 30. Pierre and Rose became Joseph's parents at a relatively old age, being 59 and 44 years old respectively. Vacher had a twin brother, Eugène, who died in infancy on 15 July 1870, after choking to death on a loaf of bread that had been placed in the shared cradle by one of Vacher's older brothers.

=== Childhood and adolescence ===
As a child, Vacher was already noted for his temper, having once shot at a group of other boys with his father's rifle for heckling him. Another incident occurred while working on the family farm, when he attempted to strangle his younger brother Louis because Vacher thought he was slacking off while helping him push a wheelbarrow.

In the summer of 1884, a ten-year-old boy named Joseph Amieux was raped and murdered inside a barn in a neighboring town. Although the crime is blamed on vagabonds, then-14-year-old Vacher would later be suspected as having been the true perpetrator. At age fifteen, Vacher was sent to his widowed half-sister in Saint-Genis-Laval, who, overwhelmed by the task of caring for the temperamental youth, sent him to a very strict Marist Brothers school, where he was taught to obey and to fear God. He was meant to be educated there until he was 18, but expelled after only two years, as monks at the school noted Vacher for torturing animals and masturbation. He found work as a restaurant worker and moved in with his sister and her husband in Marcollin. While living with them, Vacher contracted syphilis and had to have his left testicle surgically removed at Antiquaille Hospital six months following the diagnosis.

At age 18, he was reported for the attempted rape of a 12-year-old boy on a farm in Beaufort on 29 June 1888. The victim, Marcelin Bourdon, was pushed down while baling hay in a barn, but managed to punch Vacher and alert fellow workers to the scene. Vacher avoided a charge of pederasty as he fled town and his employers were unaware of his residence. He was evicted in 1889 by his brother-in-law due to his aggressive behaviour and went to Geneva to ask to live with his brother Auguste, to whom he admitted to the attempted rape in Beaufort and possibly referenced other violent crimes he committed. After he was rejected by his brother, he lived in Lyon. In 1891, Vacher was briefly confined to an asylum for voicing persecutory delusions.

== Military service ==
Seeking escape from the intense poverty of his peasant background, he joined the army in 1890, serving in the 60th infantry regiment. Early into his enlistment, Vacher was transferred from his initial living quarters because he kept stealing and hiding the clothes of fellow soldiers. Vacher was noted for his ill temper and aggressive behaviour towards his fellow soldiers. In his first year of service, Vacher made at least two murder attempts on superior officers. In the first instance, frustrated at slow promotion, infused with the grandiose belief that he was not receiving the attention he deserved, Vacher made threats against Barbier, a recently promoted corporal from his unit. When Barbier arrived in Vacher's barracks to calm him down, Vacher attacked him with a straight razor. After failing to injure Barbier, Vacher instead tried to kill himself by slicing his throat, in his first known suicide attempt. In another incident, Vacher tried to stab a sergeant fourrier with a pair of tailor's scissors. He was brought to the infirmary for overnights stays after both incidents, and following the second attack, he was heard screaming "Blood! I'll kill him! They don't know what I'm capable of!" (Note: "Du sang! Je le tuerai! Ils ne savent pas de quoi je suis capable!") In another incident, Vacher lunged at the adjutant sergeant Tissot with a razor when the latter confiscated a bottle of brandy from him. Despite these incidents, Vacher was promoted to corporal the same year.

After reaching the rank of sergeant on 28 December 1892, Vacher was known to punish soldiers for infractions by physically beating them, once nearly strangling a man to death. One soldier, a private named Mathieu, attested that Vacher kicked him in the abdomen for failing to keep a steady marching pace and threatened to court-martial Mathieu. On the way to the barracks, however, Vacher took Mathieu aside and admitted that he would not have a proper case against Mathieu, asking him to forget about the threat. Reportedly, Vacher was also known to steal from civilians, for which he was never charged since the items were of low value.

Although he served for under three years, Vacher would later claim to have been a non-commissioned officer with the Zouaves, which, while unsubstantiated and unlikely, was widely repeated in contemporary English-language media. Related to this, Vacher stated he had evaded arrest in 1897 by repeating this claim to a gendarme who was about to book him for running from law enforcement; said gendarme was looking for the perpetrator in a nearby murder committed by Vacher.

=== Attempted murder-suicide ===
In the spring of 1893, while Vacher was stationed in Besançon, he fell in love with a young maidservant, Louise Barant. After his attempted suicide led to a four-month dismissal from the military, he invited her to a meal and proposed to Barant during this first rendezvous. She declined because Vacher said he would "kill [her] if she betrayed [him]" in the same breath. Vacher nevertheless attempted to move in with Barant and her parents, and failing that, he stalked her while she was at work. Privately, Vacher grew paranoid that Barant had become involved with his best friend Louis Loyonnet, a fellow soldier who was a childhood friend from the Marist school. Barant eventually accepted an invitation to go to a dance with him, but ran off when Vacher attacked a man who spoke to Barant during the date.

Barant moved back to her mother in Baume-les-Dames, so Vacher instead began sending her love letters, again trying to court her, and repeating his marriage proposal. On 24 June 1893, Vacher got into an argument with Barant as she refused to acknowledge his letters and gifts. When she told Vacher that she rejected the marriage offer, Vacher grabbed Barant from behind and took out a kitchen knife, shouting "As good as today as tomorrow!", (Note: Autant aujourd'hui que demain!) but fled without harming Barant when he heard someone approaching. The following day, on 25 June, Vacher purchased a swordstick, a revolver and ammunition, and entered Barant's residence in Besançon. Vacher told Barant to either accept his proposal or return the letters and gifts, but before she could answer, Vacher shot her three times in the head with the revolver. Barant was badly injured from a shot through the mouth, which broke off two front teeth, and grazes by both temples, but survived the shooting. Vacher then attempted suicide by shooting himself twice in the head. Vacher survived these injuries, instead paralyzing one side of his face, deforming him severely. One of the bullets remained lodged in his ear for the remainder of his life, and the damage to his brain likely exacerbated his existing mental illness. He felt that the shooting damaged him more than physically: he later claimed, after his arrest, that the reactions of strangers to this self-inflicted deformity drove him to hatred of society at large. Barant received dentistry treatment and returned to work within two weeks of the shooting the following July.

On 7 July 1893, Vacher was confined to Saint-Ylle Psychiatric Hospital in Dole, Jura, where he often attacked staff, destroyed furniture, and wrote letters to officials, claiming he suffered abuse there. On 2 August, Vacher was discharged from the army in relation to the attempted killing, but still received a certificate of good conduct. He briefly escaped the facility on 25 August, but was caught a few weeks later, though once more fleeing by jumping out of a train window while he was being transported back to Dole. When he was found and brought back two days later, he tried to commit suicide by repeatedly bashing his head against a wall. On 21 December of the same year, a court found him not guilty of the attempted murder of Louise Barant by reason of insanity and he was transferred to the state-run Saint-Robert Psychiatric Hospital outside of Grenoble. He stayed there for three months until his doctors pronounced him "completely cured," and released on 1 April 1894. In total, Vacher spent less than ten months in treatment. That same day, during a meeting with his former subordinate, Private Mathieu, Vacher stated that he had "tricked" staff into the release by claiming he had suffered only "temporary insanity".

== Murders ==
Vacher began murdering his victims shortly after his release at the age of 25. During a three-year period beginning in 1894, Vacher murdered and mutilated at least 11 people (one woman, six teenage girls, and four teenage boys). Many of them were shepherds watching their flocks in isolated fields. The victims were stabbed repeatedly, often disemboweled, raped, and sodomized, the last two occasionally post-mortem. Vacher became a drifter, travelling from town to town, from Normandy to Provence, staying mainly in the southeast of France and surviving by begging or working on farms as a day labourer. Most murders occurred in what is now the Auvergne-Rhône-Alpes region. By most accounts, Vacher was unkempt and frightening, wandering from town to town as a vagrant in filthy clothes, begging in the streets and surviving on the scraps he received from anyone who would show him kindness. The few times he took temporary work such as shepherding from farmers, Vacher would often quit midway and still demand full payment. During this time, he was twice arrested for vagrancy, but never suspected of the killings. He reportedly attributed being undetected by police to God's grace and would regularly undertake pilgrimages to Lourdes to pray to the statue of the Virgin Mary.

Authorities did not make a connection between any of the killings until the summer of 1897, when newly installed judge Émile Fourquet, who had investigated the murder of Augustine Mortureux in 1895, had judicial offices in départements across Southern France collect records of unsolved murders, having concluded that a single individual was behind some of the gruesome murders reported to him due to their shared mutilation and/or victim group.

=== Notable sightings and incidents ===
On 2 September 1895, a man matching Vacher's exact description was reported in Belley, having squatted for a night at the local washhouse and become aggressive with locals, including a ten-year-old girl he tried to buy wine from with just ten centimes and farmers who had denied him work, but offered him alms.

On 31 July 1896, while in Précy, Vacher went to the home of a ferryman named Abel Sandrin, with whom he had an unspecified dispute, and started a fistfight. Sandrin deflected each blow and retaliated with punches of his own, which left Vacher bloodied while Sandrin remained unharmed.

On 17 October 1896, Vacher passed through the commune of Job, where he knocked on the house of a woman surnamed Gouttebel and asked her for cheese. Gouttebel turned to the kitchen to bring him some food when Vacher threw himself on her when she returned. Gouttebel tore away from his grip and ran outside to alert her neighbours. He was arrested for the assault, but eventually let go after a short stay in jail.

Through early-mid February, 1897, Vacher lodged in Couloubrac, a hamlet near Lacaune, first accompanied by another vagrant named Gautrais. He stayed with two families, the Farencs and the Moffres, who later identified him by photograph, wearing his old infantry fatigues. He often entertained the children of his lodgers by reading them books or showing off "souvenirs" from his past, including two large hiking sticks and a photo of a woman in miller's garb, whom he claimed was his "mistress" Maria Lourdes, a name that was also engraved on a knife and leather sheath he carried. (Note: Vacher apparently claimed "Maria Lourdes" was the name of a real woman he was involved with, when it was a common name for the statue of the Virgin Mary in Lourdes.) On 17 February, he knocked on the door of Suzanne Cabrol, who allowed him in to warm himself by the fireplace. Two talked amicably until Cabrol mentioned that she had received a 2500-franc inheritance from her sister in Castres. At this point, the previously tranquil Vacher stared at her "with bad air", at which point Cabrol shouted for her husband (who was actually away that night), causing Vacher to bolt out of the house. She was confirmed to be telling the truth as she independently noted the sergeant chevrons on Vacher's clothing. Most witnesses recalled that Vacher made frequent mention of the Virgin Mary, specifically in relation to the Lourdes apparitions. Also, on either 13 or 17 February, he passed through the hamlet of Carausse and rested at the house of 43-year-old Virginie Bousquet, who let him rest by the hearth for the night. She left Vacher at the house for a while to go for a walk because he made her uncomfortable with stories of "crude, strange things that happened at the convents" he was raised in. When Bousquet returned, she found her youngest daughter, 6-year-old Germaine, sitting on Vacher's knees. Bousquet was able to get her guest to get leave by threatening to call for her neighbours and barred the door afterwards to be safe. She asked Germaine if anything had happened and the girl revealed that Vacher had been clutching a knife behind her back in a hand hidden between his thighs.

He was sighted again on 22 February in Lagarrigue, when he stayed with family of Paul Valette, whose 11- or 12-year-old daughter he taught to write a sentence in "elegant English writing": "Among travelers there are often great minds and sometimes even great friends of God". Afterwards, he begged for food at the house of a miller, Mme Hue, who first gave him soup, but went back on her offer when he did not thank her. In the ensuing argument, he insulted Hue and ran off. Vacher went to the house of Mme Assimot to warm himself at the fireplace. While they talked, one of Vacher's canes fell to the ground, revealing a long blade inside and frightened by this, Assimot ordered Vacher to leave. Her account was substantiated due to the matching description of the swordstick, an item Vacher was known to own, having been catalogued during his arrest for the Barant affair.

On 13 July, Vacher bought a small black-white dog from a cobbler named Joseph Passas in Colombier-le-Jeune, which he named Loulette. According to a family who let Vacher lodge with them for a few days in Dunières, they took him in on 14 July after seeing him beg outside of a pub, playing the accordion while Loulette pranced around with a tamed magpie perched on her back. Although Vacher had claimed to play the accordion to the families back in Couloubrac, onlooker Vital Vallonre said his tune was off-key and that he was unable to play la Marseillaise when asked. The family recalled that he was kind to the couple's four daughters and their friends, for whom he performed music and made funny faces. He had reportedly asked their neighbors if there were any open shepherd jobs. One of them, Mme Ranc in nearby Vernoux turned him away when she asked where he was from and he replied, with a glare, "from a mental asylum". On 2 August, Vacher was ousted from the area by locals following an incident at the farm of Régis Bac near Alboussière. Bac had given Vacher some stew, which Vacher then tried to share with his dog Loulette. When the animal did not eat, Vacher said "If you don't want to eat this, I will kill you" before grabbing Loulette and throwing her to the ground until the dog's head caved in, doing the same to his pet bird. Bac gave Vacher a shovel to bury the animals before telling him to leave.

=== Final attacks and capture ===
In the morning hours of 4 August 1897 Vacher tried to assault Marie Héraud gathering wood and pinecones in a field in Champis. She fought back and her screams soon alerted two of her children, as well as her husband, 31-year-old Séraphin Plantier, who came rushing to her aid. Although Plantier was of slight build and shorter than Vacher, he fought off the attacker and pelted him with two stones. The commotion was heard by four neighbours, also collecting cinder, who rushed to Plantier's aid and restrained Vacher. As the men escorted him to the residential area, Vacher told a different tramp as they passed, "Look, I wanted to have a quickie, they wouldn't let me". (Note: French: "Tiens, je voulais tirer un coup, l’on ne m’a pas laissé faire.") They locked him in a shed at a nearby inn, with Dupré Charlon, the homeowner, and the four neighbours keeping watch as Plantier left with his wife to get police from the station in Saint-Péray, leaving the men to guard Vacher for the next six hours.

Charlon would later recall that Vacher spouted all manner of obscenities at them and ranted about how he had "rights" and wanted to exercise them on "all women". When Charlon joked that Vacher should "pay for the personnel, get married", Vacher took the statement seriously, saying "No, I have as many rights as anyone over all women and I want to use them". (Note: French: "Non, j’ai autant de droits que quiconque sur toutes les femmes et je veux en user.") When Vacher noticed Charlon's wife and children were in the house, he exclaimed "La garce!" ("The bitch!") and continued to scream vulgar insults for the next hours, refusing to interact further with Charlon outside of spitting at him when he got close. Vacher would attempt twice to escape the shed, being prevented by Charlon, who would kick him back. At one point, Vacher asked for a drink. Charlon gave him a glass and while in the process of filling it with fresh water, a few drops landed on Vacher's shoe. This resulted in Vacher throwing the glass in Charlon's face, who reciprocated by hitting him with the metal water jug and kicking him to the ground. While Vacher proceeded to threaten Charlon and his family with death and torture once he got out of prison, Charlon asked why he didn't just hire prostitutes instead of attacking random women, to which Vacher replied "No, no, I respect myself more than you do. I don't want the ones you talk about. I need young girls, shepherdesses or cowgirls". (Note: French: "Non, non, je me respecte plus que toi. Je ne veux pas de celles dont tu parles. Il me faut des jeunes filles, bergères ou vachères.") Charlon then asked why he attacked Héraud, a mother of three, if he wanted "young girls", with Vacher stating "Oh, I would have much preferred to have the other one, the young girl from Gravil [a nearby farm]. That's the one I had wanted". (Note: French: "Oh, j ’aurais bien préféré avoir l'autre. La jeune fille du Gravil. C’est celle-là que je voulais.") When Plantier returned with two officers, Vacher was sitting near a tree, playing his accordion, and upon seeing the gendarmerie, he simply said, "If you were in my place, you would do like me, but you have women and I have none". (Note: French: "Si vous étiez à ma place, vous feriez comme moi, mais vous avez des femmes et moi je n’en ai pas.")

Vacher was first charged with public indecency for attempted rape, receiving a three-month and one day prison sentence. Based on judge Fourquet's belief that the arrested tramp might be the killer he was looking for, Vacher was transported to Prison Saint-Paul by train via the Lyon-Saint-Paul to Montbrison Line, where he briefly escaped at the exit of La Mulatière tunnel before he was recaptured at Perrache station. Fifteen residents of Bénonces, where a murder linked to Vacher had taken place, were called in and all identified Vacher as having been in town at the time of the murder. Despite their belief that they had apprehended the man responsible, the authorities had little physical evidence that Vacher was responsible for the series of murders, and Vacher adamantly denied involvement during questioning. However, on 7 October, with little apparent prompting, Vacher confessed to committing the some of murders brought against him, first only to eight, but later eleven, saying, "I have come to tell you the whole truth. Yes, I am the one who committed all the crimes you have accused me of... and that in a moment of rage". (Note: French: "Je viens vous faire savoir toute la vérité. Oui c'est moi qui ai commis tous les crimes que vous m'avez reprochés... et cela dans un moment de rage.")

== Insanity plea ==
After his arrest, Vacher claimed he was insane and attempted to prove it in a variety of ways. He claimed that a rabid dog's bite had poisoned his blood, causing madness, but later blamed the quack cure he received for the bite. He also claimed he was sent by God, comparing himself to Joan of Arc. Despite his protestations, he was pronounced sane after lengthy investigations by a team of doctors that included the eminent professor Alexandre Lacassagne. Court documents say that investigators were able to confirm that Vacher kept close contact with sheep dogs as a child, but believed that Vacher's insistence on their responsibility for his condition actually ties back to their owner, the commune's garde champêtre, who may have raped Vacher when he was six years old. He was tried and convicted by judge Émile Fourquet of the Cour d'Assises of Ain, the département where he had murdered two of his victims, and was sentenced to death for the murder of Victor Portalier on 28 October 1898. On 26 January 1898, Vacher broke out of his cell and seriously injured the on-duty guard by battering him with a chair before he was subdued by other staff. Vacher was executed by guillotine at 7:03 a.m. on 31 December 1898, in front of a crowd of 3,500 people. He refused to walk to the scaffold under his own power and was dragged to the guillotine by the executioners.

== Victims ==
=== Confirmed ===
A list of Vacher's known victims.

- 19 May 1894 in Beaurepaire: Eugénie Delhomme (21), silk factory worker (Note: Some sources describe her as also moonlighting as a sex worker)
- 20 November 1894 in La Vacquière, near Vidauban: Louise Marcel (13), shepherd
- 12 May 1895 in Étaules: Augustine Mortureux (17), shepherd (Note: Full name either Augustine-Adèle Mortureux or Augustine Ernestine Mortureux. Sometimes erroneously named only Adèle Mortureux)
- Unknown date between 27 May and 5 June 1895 in Tassin-la-Demi-Lune: Claudius Beaupied (12), (Note: Misstated his age as 14 to his employer) shepherd from Lyon
- 24 August 1895 in Saint-Ours: Péronne Moraud (née Baud; 68), farmer
- 31 August 1895 in Onglas, near Bénonces: Victor Portalier (16), shepherd
- 21 September 1895 in Saint-Étienne-de-Boulogne: Pierre Massot-Pellet (14), shepherd from Marseille
- 23 September 1895 in Truinas: Aline Alaise (16), shepherd
- 10 September 1896 in Busset: Marie Lorut (née Moussier; 19), shepherd
- 1 October 1896 in Varenne-Saint-Honorat: Rosine (Note: Some sources mistakenly identify this victim as male, mistaking Rosine with her 13-year-old brother Alphonse, whom Vacher had planned to attack on 30 September, but relented due to the arrival of other workers) Rodier (14), shepherd
- 19 June 1897 in Courzieu-la-Giraudière: Pierre Laurent (14), (Note: He is sometimes mistakenly identified as "Bully". This comes from reporting regarding previous victim Claudius Beaupied, who, before being identified, was rumored to be a 17-year-old boy named "François Bully" from Fontaines-sur-Saône. It was later used by Vacher as mockery in a letter to the investigating judge. Due to the relative infamy of the letter in the case, American media ended up incorrectly attributing the name to Vacher's final victim, as his killing was more prominent.) shepherd

In some of the murders, false accusations were made by local residents and the press. Not long after the discovery of Eugénie Delhomme's body, farmer Louis François was arrested by police as a suspect. Eugène Grenier, a land owner in Daix who employed victim Augustine Mortureux and one of the men who found her, was detained for 45 days after being publicly accused by Le Bourguignon Salé and Le Bien Public, with the locals outside the jail calling for him to be lynched. Even after he was released due to lack of evidence, Grenier and his family were treated as outcasts, with suspicions still remaining after Vacher's confessions two years later.

Additionally, Vacher is suspected to have committed serial rapes in the départements of Drôme, Puy-de-Dôme, and Isère. A rape against a female juvenile in Brioude during December 1896 was linked to Vacher.

=== Suspected ===
During his trial, Vacher was also accused of the following murders:

- 18 July 1884 in Eclose: Joseph Amieux (10)
- 26 June 1888 in Joux: Unidentified woman (c.35)
- 1 July 1888 in Chambérat: Clémence Grangeon (14)
- 30 June 1889 in Moirans: Augustine-Mélanie Perrin (23)
- 29 September 1890 in Varacieux: Olympe Buisson (9)
- 3 February 1892 in Rochegude: Élisabeth Laborel (53) (also robbed)
- 22 October 1892 in La Comelle: Unidentified man, vagrant
- 10 June 1893 in La Romieu: Léa-Catherine Marie Anne Gourrange (7) (Note: Claimed in the 31 October 1897 print of L'Express du Midi. Generally subject to dispute due to the long distance between Besançon and La Romieu, taking around 13 days back and forth on foot, although not impossible to rule out as there is a 15 day gap between the killing and Vacher's later murder-suicide attempt in Baumes-de-Dames)
- 24 February 1894 in Tencin: Jean-Baptiste Piraud (Note: Claimed in the October 27, 1897 print of La Lanterne. Although the location fits, being near Grenoble, Vacher was still institutionalised at the time, albeit with much laxer security with no surviving protocol records about his movements)
- 6–7 December 1894 in Châteaudouble: Jean Honorat (75) and Marianne Perrimond (71), husband and wife (possibly committed with an accomplice)
- 17 February 1895 in the arrondissement of Autun: "Jobey" Corneau (74) (also robbed)
- 22–23 July 1895 in Chambuet near Yenne: Mme Reynaud (64)
- 7 September 1895 in Montmort: Francine Rouvray (30s)
- 22 September 1895 in Four: Marguerite "Madeleine" Martelât (64)
- 22 September 1895 in Hauterives: Mme Wassy
- 22 December 1895 in La Baronnière, near Guéret: Unnamed elderly woman
- May–June 1896 in Tain: Unidentified man, vagrant
- 22 August 1896 in Reims: Maria Clement (17)
- 6–7 September 1896 between Chambost and Sain-Bel: Antoine Bonnassieux (58), chicken farmer (also robbed)
- 26 September 1896 between Chissey-en-Morvan and Moux-en-Morvan: Marguerite Charlot (née Renaud; 66)
- 27 September 1896 in Allègre: Marie Monatte (60), washerwoman
- 29 October 1896 in Parnans: Marie Ageron (65)
- 11–12 November 1896 in Brive: Louradour, soldier
- 23 November 1896 in Baume-d'Hostun: Mme Montfort
- 22–23 February 1897 in Lacaune: Célestin Gautrais (39), vagrant from Bourberain
- 18 March 1897 in Belfort: Adrienne Reuillard (9) (Note: Her parents, Amélie André and Pierre François Célestine Reuillard, give Adrienne's age as "four and a half" in the case ledger)
- 5 April 1897 between Vienne-le-Château and Binarville: Thérèse Ply (19), woodworker
- 11 April 1897 in Les Haïes: Geneviève Heymein (née Cadet, 68)
- 1 May 1897 between Chaumont-la-Ville and Vrécourt: Jeanne-Elise-Clémentine Henrion (14), seamstress
- 18 May 1897 in Communay: François Castigliano (66), busker, originally from Alpette, Italy (Note: Supposedly Vacher stole his accordion from Castigliano, although his death was reported as an accident in Le Journal de Vienne)
- 16 June 1897 in Raimbeaucourt: Amélie Debreuille
- 6 July 1897 in Volvent: Jean Marie Lagier (née Faure; 60)
- 23–24 July 1897 in Coux: Mélanie Victoire Laville (née Vianet; 61), pub owner (possibly committed with an accomplice)

False arrests were made in at least two of the murders. A shop owner named Thalmann was briefly detained for the murder of Adrienne Reuillard and forced out of town by locals after he could not be tied to the scene. In the murder of Jeanne Henrion a man surnamed Munier was incriminated by witness Montchablon for returning a day after the killing with scratches on his face. It was found that Munier had, on the day following Henrion's death, attempted to rape a young Swiss girl, who "fell ill and died" after the act. The judicial error accusing him of the Henrion murder led to his exoneration on both charges, after which locals shunned him and his family.

A public poster published titled "52 Crimes: Attributed to Vacher or confessed by him" (Note: French: 52 Crimes: Imputés á Vacher ou avoués par lui) listed his tentative offenses as 46 murders, three attempted murders, two attempted rapes and connection to one disappearance, though with several misspelled names and other mistakes, such as placing the murder of Joseph Amieux, who was killed in 1884, in 1894.

In addition to Louise Barant, Vacher was alleged to have made the following murder attempts:

- 1 July 1888 in Saint-Pal-de-Chalençon: Unidentified woman, sherpherd (occurred after the Grangeon murder)
- 17 May 1894 in Roches: Victorine Gay (née Gueyfier; 55), gardener (also attempted rape)
- 18 May 1894 in Roches: Mme Eydan, gardener (also attempted rape)
- 19 May 1894 in Roches: Mélanie Pallas (née Jay), gardener (also attempted rape)
- 31 March 1895 in Saint-Fons: Antoinette-Augustine Marchand (28), saleswoman
- 14 April 1895 in Lyon or Dijon: Unnamed woman, orange vendor (also attempted rape)
- 15 or 20 August 1895 in Belley: Alexandre Léger (7), shepherd
- 25 February 1896 in Nouans: Mlle de L. (38) (also attempted rape)
- 1 March 1896 in Noyen: Alphonsine Derouet (11) (also attempted rape)
- 30 September 1896 in Varenne-Saint-Honorat: Alphonse Rodier (13), shepherd
- 17 October 1896 in Job: Mme Gouttebel
- November 1896 in Riousset near Brugeron: Marie Dubreuil (née Roure) (robbed)
- 12–15 February 1897 in Couloubrac near Lacaune: Blavy and Chalbert, domestic servants
- 17 February 1897 in Couloubrac: Suzanne Cabrol (née Fabre; 65)
- 26 April 1897 in Graffigny: Léonie Soyer (18), glovemaker
- 1 May 1897 in Daillecourt and Vrécourt: Blanche Humbert (15), shepherd, and Mme Henriot (occurred before the Henrion murder)
- 18 July 1897 in Rochemaure: Marguerite Siratat (née Epp; 61)
- 21 July 1897 in Baix: Marie-Eugénie Malartre (née Durieu; 60s) and her son
- 21 July 1897 in Darbres: Marie Vantalon (28), Henri Marnas (8) and Louis Delhomme (14), shepherds
- 25 July 1897 in Valettes near Flaviac: Maria Pradal (18–20), silk factory worker
- 4 August 1897 in Champis: Fanny Issartel (16), shepherd (Note: Vacher initially intended to abduct another shepherd, 12-year-old Fanny Lebrat, from a neighbouring farm on 1 August, but relented after a boy told him his brothers were present too)
- 4 August 1897 in Champis: Marie-Eugénie Héraud (28)

American newspapers would somewhat exaggerate Vacher's killings, reporting the high end estimation of 38 possible victims as fact. The newspapers also named victims that are not mentioned in surviving French newspapers nor alleged by court or investigators. (Note: From the New York Journal and Advertiser, apparently quoting "Courrier de Lyon" and claiming a total of 19 confirmed victims (unique names only): Philomene Lozere (18), 1889, Marie Terrier (16), 1890, Attalle Pedron (14), 1891, Nanette Poirier (11), 1891, Gabrielle Maret (14), 1892, Severine Troncon (14), 1893, Armande Rosier (17), 1893, Suzanne Flairet (14), 1894, Lizette Thiriot (14), 1894) One of the most widely shared, yet unconfirmed cases of this kind is the supposed murder of a French nobleman, named only as the "Marquis de Villeplaine", who had fallen victim to a fatal robbery during a park walk near the French-Spanish border. After his execution, it was widely reported by the same sources that Vacher was a self-admitted anarchist, after proclaiming during a prison transport that he was "the anarchist of God" and his murders related to his "oppos[ition] to society, no matter what form of government may be [sic]".

== Legacy ==
Vacher's place in French social history is similar to Jack the Ripper's place in British social history.

== In popular culture ==
- In 1976 French filmmaker Bertrand Tavernier made a film called Le juge et l'assassin (The Judge and the Murderer) that was inspired by Vacher's story. The name of the murderer, played by Michel Galabru, is slightly changed into "Joseph Bouvier" (in French, the words bouvier and vacher describe the same profession, herdsman).
- In the 1949 novel The Sheltering Sky by Paul Bowles, in a private dialogue with her husband Port, the character Kit Morseby says of the character Eric Lyle: "He looks like a young Vacher".
- In the episode "Probable Cause" of the TV series Castle, serial killer 3XK uses Vacher's name as an alias.
- In the film Psychopathia Sexualis Vacher is the first case study of a sexual mental illness presented.
- In the video game Genshin Impact, the character "Vacher" (Marcel) during the Fontaine Archon Quest is inspired by the real-life Vacher.

== See also ==
- Jack the Ripper
- List of French serial killers

== General bibliography ==
- Lacassagne, Alexandre, Vacher l'éventreur et les crimes sadiques, 1899 On-line (French)
- Bouchardon, Pierre, Vacher l'éventreur, Albin Michel, 1939, 252 p.
- Deloux, Jean-Pierre, Vacher l'éventreur, E/dite Histoire, 2000 (1995), 191 p. (Main source used to improve this article)
- Garet, Henri and Tavernier, René, Le juge et l'assassin, Presses de la cité, 1976, 315 p.
- Kershaw, Alister. Murder in France, Constable, London, 1955, 188 p.
- Lane, Brian. "Encyclopedia of Serial Killers", Diamond Books, 1994.
- Starr, Douglas: The Killer of Little Shepherds: A True Crime Story and the Birth of Forensic Science. Alfred A. Knopf, New York 2010. ISBN 978-0-307-26619-4 [hard cover, 300 p], ISBN 978-0-307-59458-7 [eBook]
