= Craponne-sur-Arzon =

- Commune
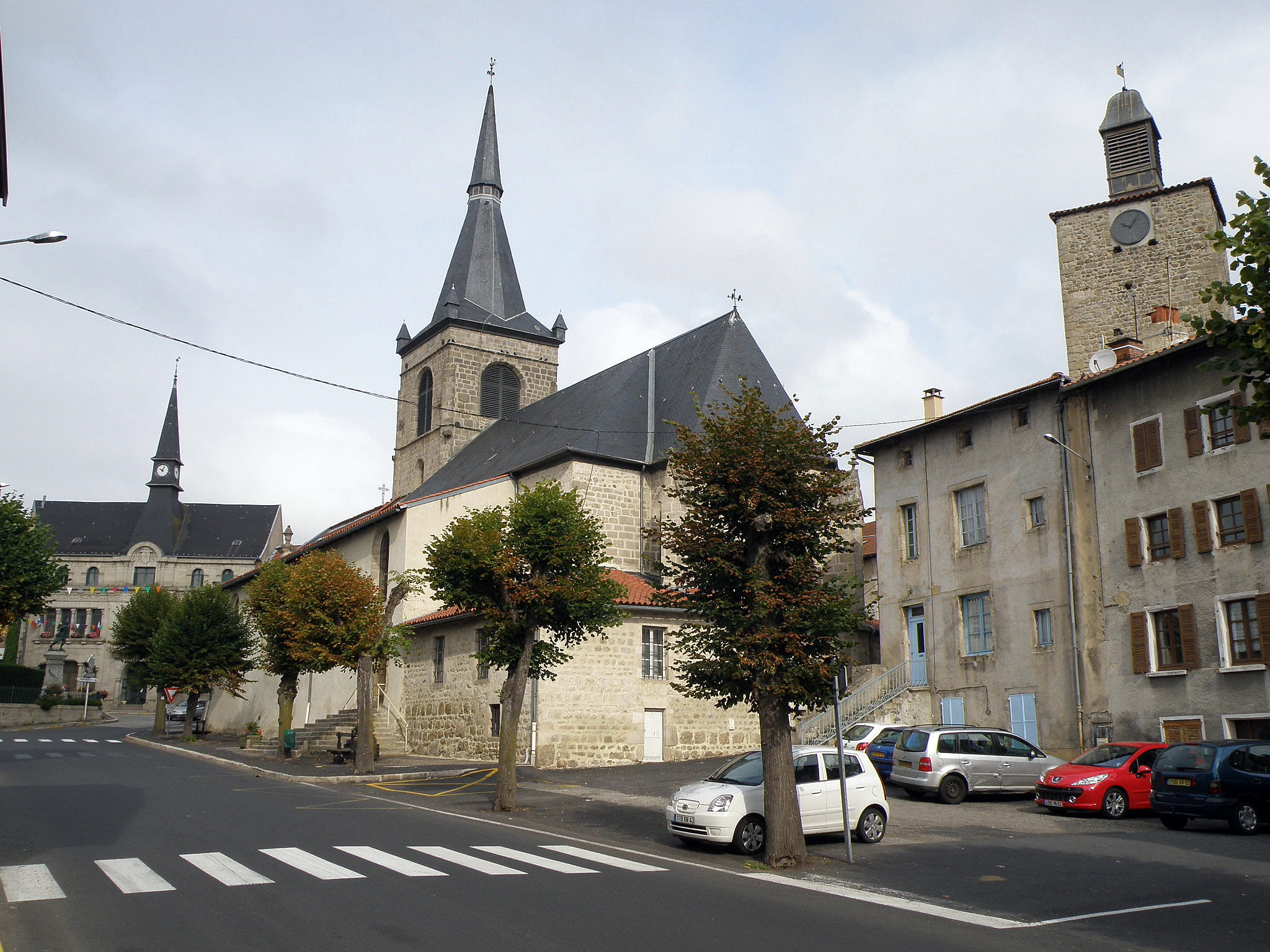

- Coat of arms
- Location of Craponne-sur-Arzon
- Location within France Location within Auvergne-Rhône-Alpes
- Coordinates: 45°19′55″N 3°50′56″E
- Country: France
- Region: Auvergne-Rhône-Alpes
- Department: Haute-Loire
- Arrondissement: Le Puy-en-Velay
- Canton: Plateau du Haut-Velay granitique
- Intercommunality: CA du Puy-en-Velay

Government
  - Mayor (2020–2026): Laurent Mirmand
- Area^{1}: 33.37 km^{2} (12.88 sq mi)
- Elevation: 937 m (3,074 ft)
- Highest elevation: 1,063 m (3,488 ft)
- Lowest elevation: 771 m (2,530 ft)
- Population (2023): 1,998
  - Density: 59.87/km^{2} (155.1/sq mi)
- Time zone: UTC+01:00 (CET)
  - Summer (DST): UTC+02:00 (CEST)
- INSEE/Postal code: 43080 /43500
- ^{1} French Land Register data, which excludes lakes, ponds, glaciers > 1 km^{2} (0.386 sq mi or 247 acres) and river estuaries.

Craponne-sur-Arzon (French pronunciation: [kʁapɔn syʁ aʁzɔ̃]; Auvergnat: Crapòna) is a commune in the Haute-Loire department in south-central France.

== Location ==
The town of Craponne-sur-Arzon is located in the north of the department of Haute-Loire, on the border with the departments of Puy-de-Dôme in the north, and the Loire in the east. Sauvessanges, Usson-en-Forez, Saint-Georges-Lagricol, Beaune-sur-Arzon, Jullianges, Saint-Victor-sur-Arlanc and Saint-Jean-d'Aubrigoux are the bordering communes. Finally, as the crow flies, the town is located 32 km from Le Puy-en-Velay, the prefecture, 45 km from Saint-Étienne and 77 km from Clermont-Ferrand.

Located on a granitic plateau mostly situated at more than 900 meters elevation, the commune has a minimum elevation of 771 meters, near the Bois de l'Or along the river Ance in the south-east part of the commune. Its maximum elevation is about 1063 meters, the highest point being located near the place called Le Fêtre, in the north of the town.

The area of the town is 3337 hectares.

== History ==
Located since the Gallo-Roman era at the crossroads of strategic routes, the rural town of Craponne-sur-Arzon developed into a market town, where markets and fairs were held, as evidenced by many toponyms (rue de la Friperie, Marchedial, etc.). In the feudal era, the town was surrounded by a wall, built in 1450—from which two small defensive towers have been preserved until today—and this wall was defended by a castle. In 1576, the castle was demolished, with the exception of the tower entrance (improperly called today, the "donjon"). This castle belonged until 1240 to the barons of Beaumont, before passing into the hands of the lords of Chalençon, who became the Polignac family in 1420.

== Hydrography ==
Two main rivers traverse the municipality of Craponne-sur-Arzon. The first, the Ance, has its source in the Forez mountains near Pierre-sur-Haute, crossing the town on its western part. The Arzon crosses the commune on its eastern part, forming the natural frontier of the commune. Its source is located in the wood of Viviers, in the town of Medeyrolles.

The town is located in the Loire river basin.

== Population ==
Historical population
Year	Pop.	±% p.a.
1968	3,004	—
1975	3,086	+0.39%
1982	3,186	+0.46%
1990	3,008	−0.72%
1999	2,653	−1.39%
2007	2,172	−2.47%
2012	2,196	+0.22%
2017	1,982	−2.03%
2023	1,998	+0.13%
Source: INSEE

== Events ==
Astronomical Spring Meetings have been held in the city since 2004. More than 300 amateur astronomers gather every year during the weekend of Ascension to observe the sky and for friendly exchanges between enthusiasts.

Since 1993, Craponne-sur-Arzon has hosted a large country music festival, among the largest in Europe, every year on the last weekend of July. Since 2013 the festival has declined and in 2018 the producers changed its name into The Green Escape with a wider variety of musical genres including Rock, Blues, Folk, French commercial music. After two years the event bankrupted. The City of Craponne with a few volunteers are trying to put on a new event but it will only be a very local event. Craponne has lost the most renowned country music festival in France in Europe.

== See also ==
- Communes of the Haute-Loire department
