= 2005 Paris–Nice =

UCI ProTour

Race details
- Dates: 6–13 March 2005
- Stages: 7 + Prologue
- Distance: 950.5 km (590.6 mi)
- Winning time: 22h 32' 13"

Results
Jersey awarded to the overall winner	Winner	Bobby Julich (USA)	(Team CSC)
	Second	Alejandro Valverde (ESP)	(Illes Balears–Caisse d'Epargne)
	Third	Constantino Zaballa (ESP)	(Saunier Duval–Prodir)
Jersey awarded to the points classification winner	Points	Jens Voigt (GER)	(Team CSC)
Jersey awarded to the mountains classification winner	Mountains	David Moncoutié (FRA)	(Cofidis)
Jersey awarded to the young rider classification winner	Young rider	Alejandro Valverde (ESP)	(Illes Balears–Caisse d'Epargne)
	Team	(Denmark) Team CSC	

The 2005 Paris–Nice was the 63rd edition of the Paris–Nice cycle race and was held from 6 March to 13 March 2005. The race started in Issy-les-Moulineaux and finished in Nice. The race was won by Bobby Julich of Team CSC.

== Teams ==
Twenty-one teams, containing a total of 168 riders, participated in the race:

- Liberty Seguros–Würth
- Gerolsteiner
- Team CSC
- T-Mobile Team
- Rabobank
- Discovery Channel
- Quick-Step–Innergetic
- Phonak
- Fassa Bortolo
- Cofidis
- Illes Balears–Caisse d'Epargne
- Davitamon–Lotto
- Saunier Duval–Prodir
- Euskaltel–Euskadi
- Bouygues Télécom
- Française des Jeux
- Crédit Agricole
- Lampre–Caffita
- Domina Vacanze
- Liquigas–Bianchi
- AG2R Prévoyance

== Route ==
Stage characteristics and winners
Stage	Date	Course	Distance	Type	Winner
P	6 March	Issy-les-Moulineaux	4 km (2.5 mi)	Individual time trial	Jens Voigt (GER)
1	7 March	Étampes to Chabris	186.5 km (115.9 mi)	Flat stage	Tom Boonen (BEL)
2	8 March	La Châtre to Thiers	46.5 km (28.9 mi) (Note: The stage was shortened from 191 km (119 mi) due to bad weather.)	Hilly stage	Tom Boonen (BEL)
3	9 March	Thiers to Craponne-sur-Arzon	117.5 km (73.0 mi) (Note: The stage was shortened from 174 km (108 mi) due to bad weather.)	Hilly stage	Vicente Reynés (ESP)
4	10 March	Le Chambon-sur-Lignon to Montélimar	104.5 km (64.9 mi) (Note: The stage was shortened from 185 km (115 mi) due to bad weather.)	Hilly stage	Fabian Cancellara (SUI)
5	11 March	Rognes to Mont Faron	172.5 km (107.2 mi)	Medium mountain stage	Gilberto Simoni (ITA)
6	12 March	La Crau to Cannes	184 km (114 mi)	Medium mountain stage	Joost Posthuma (NED)
7	13 March	Nice to Nice	135 km (84 mi)	Medium mountain stage	Alejandro Valverde (ESP)

== Stages ==
=== Prologue ===
6 March 2005 — Issy-les-Moulineaux, 4 km (2.5 mi) (ITT)

	Cyclist	Team	Time
1	Jens Voigt (GER)	Team CSC	5'15"
2	Fabian Cancellara (SUI)	Fassa Bortolo	+ 2"
3	Erik Dekker (NED)	Rabobank	+ 3"

=== Stage 1 ===
7 March 2005 — Étampes to Chabris, 186.5 km (115.9 mi)

	Cyclist	Team	Time
1	Tom Boonen (BEL)	Quick-Step–Innergetic	4h 19'15"
2	Luciano Pagliarini (BRA)	Liquigas–Bianchi	s.t.
3	Jaan Kirsipuu (EST)	Crédit Agricole	s.t.

=== Stage 2 ===
8 March 2005 — Aigueperse to Thiers, 46.5 km (28.9 mi)

	Cyclist	Team	Time
1	Tom Boonen (BEL)	Quick-Step–Innergetic	53'31"
2	Kurt Asle Arvesen (NOR)	Team CSC	s.t.
3	Jaroslav Popovych (UKR)	Discovery Channel	s.t.

=== Stage 3 ===
9 March 2005 — Thiers to Craponne-sur-Arzon, 118 km (73 mi)

	Cyclist	Team	Time
1	Vicente Reynés (ESP)	Illes Balears–Caisse d'Epargne	2h 41'51"
2	Guido Trenti (ITA)	Quick-Step–Innergetic	s.t.
3	Fred Rodriguez (USA)	Davitamon–Lotto	s.t.

=== Stage 4 ===
10 March 2005 — Saint-Péray to Montélimar, 101 km (63 mi)

	Cyclist	Team	Time
1	Fabian Cancellara (SUI)	Fassa Bortolo	2h 11'03"
2	Jaan Kirsipuu (EST)	Crédit Agricole	s.t.
3	Juan Antonio Flecha (ARG)	Fassa Bortolo	+ 2"

=== Stage 5 ===
11 March 2005 — Rognes to Mont Faron, 172.5 km (107.2 mi)

	Cyclist	Team	Time
1	Gilberto Simoni (ITA)	Lampre–Caffita	4h 07'27"
2	Cadel Evans (AUS)	Davitamon–Lotto	+ 19"
3	David Moncoutié (FRA)	Cofidis	s.t.

=== Stage 6 ===
12 March 2005 — La Crau to Cannes, 184 km (114 mi)

	Cyclist	Team	Time
1	Joost Posthuma (NED)	Rabobank	4h 21'24"
2	Jörg Ludewig (GER)	Domina Vacanze	+ 1'11
3	Aaron Kemps (AUS)	Liberty Seguros–Würth	+ 1'43"

=== Stage 7 ===
13 March 2005 — Nice to Nice, 135 km (84 mi)

	Cyclist	Team	Time
1	Alejandro Valverde (ESP)	Illes Balears–Caisse d'Epargne	3h 28'29"
2	Franco Pellizotti (ITA)	Liquigas–Bianchi	s.t.
3	Kim Kirchen (LUX)	Fassa Bortolo	s.t.

== General Standings ==
	Cyclist	Team	Time
1	Bobby Julich (USA)	Team CSC	22h 32' 13"
2	Alejandro Valverde (ESP)	Illes Balears–Caisse d'Epargne	+ 10"
3	Constantino Zaballa (ESP)	Saunier Duval–Prodir	+ 19"
4	Jens Voigt (GER)	Team CSC	+ 44"
5	Jörg Jaksche (GER)	Liberty Seguros–Würth	+ 45"
6	Franco Pellizotti (ITA)	Liquigas–Bianchi	+ 49"
7	Fränk Schleck (LUX)	Team CSC	+ 58"
8	Cadel Evans (AUS)	Davitamon–Lotto	s.t.
9	José Ángel Gómez (ESP)	Saunier Duval–Prodir	+ 1'20"
10	Davide Rebellin (ITA)	Gerolsteiner	+ 1'21"

== Mountains Classification ==
	Cyclist	Team	Points
1	David Moncoutié (FRA)	Cofidis	58 pts
2	Jörg Ludewig (GER)	Domina Vacanze	28 pts
3	Óscar Pereiro (ESP)	Phonak	19 pts

== Points Classification ==
	Cyclist	Team	Points
1	Jens Voigt (GER)	Team CSC	94 pts
2	Erik Dekker (NED)	Rabobank	70 pts
3	Alejandro Valverde (ESP)	Illes Balears–Caisse d'Epargne	68 pts

== Best Young Rider ==
	Cyclist	Team	Time
1	Alejandro Valverde (ESP)	Illes Balears–Caisse d'Epargne	22h 32' 23"
2	Fränk Schleck (LUX)	Team CSC	+ 0'48"
3	José Ángel Gómez (ESP)	Saunier Duval–Prodir	+ 1'10"

== Best Team ==
	Team	Country	Time
1	Team CSC	Denmark	67h 38' 08"
2	Saunier Duval–Prodir	Spain	+ 0'17"
3	Liberty Seguros–Würth	Spain	+ 1'50"
