= Berbezit =

- Commune
- Location of Berbezit
- Location within France Location within Auvergne-Rhône-Alpes
- Coordinates: 45°17′08″N 3°35′45″E
- Country: France
- Region: Auvergne-Rhône-Alpes
- Department: Haute-Loire
- Arrondissement: Brioude
- Canton: Plateau du Haut-Velay granitique

Government
  - Mayor (2020–2026): Nathalie Boudoul
- Area^{1}: 10.39 km^{2} (4.01 sq mi)
- Highest elevation: 1,163 m (3,816 ft)
- Lowest elevation: 712 m (2,336 ft)
- Population (2023): 45
  - Density: 4.3/km^{2} (11/sq mi)
- Time zone: UTC+01:00 (CET)
  - Summer (DST): UTC+02:00 (CEST)
- INSEE/Postal code: 43027 /43160
- ^{1} French Land Register data, which excludes lakes, ponds, glaciers > 1 km^{2} (0.386 sq mi or 247 acres) and river estuaries.

Berbezit (French pronunciation: [bɛʁbəzi]) is a commune in the Haute-Loire department in south-central France.

== Population ==
Historical population
Year	Pop.	±% p.a.
1968	101	—
1975	91	−1.48%
1982	91	+0.00%
1990	83	−1.14%
1999	59	−3.72%
2007	61	+0.42%
2012	59	−0.66%
2017	47	−4.45%
2023	45	−0.72%
Source: INSEE

== See also ==
- Communes of the Haute-Loire department
