= Cistrières =

- Commune
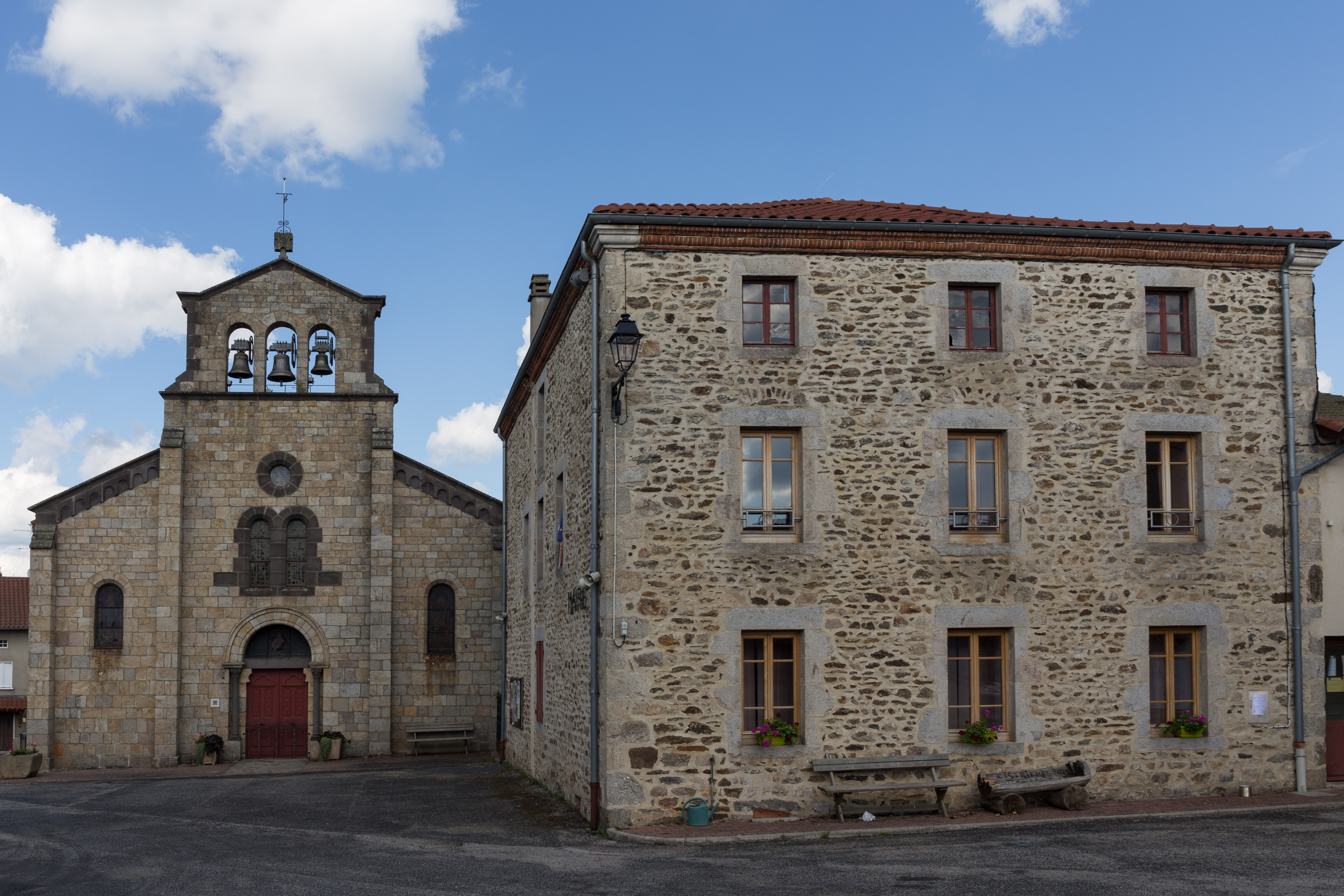
- Town hall and church
- Location of Cistrières
- Location within France Location within Auvergne-Rhône-Alpes
- Coordinates: 45°19′21″N 3°37′20″E
- Country: France
- Region: Auvergne-Rhône-Alpes
- Department: Haute-Loire
- Arrondissement: Brioude
- Canton: Plateau du Haut-Velay granitique
- Intercommunality: CA du Puy-en-Velay

Government
  - Mayor (2020–2026): Sylvie Barbé
- Area^{1}: 21.89 km^{2} (8.45 sq mi)
- Elevation: 1,000 m (3,300 ft)
- Highest elevation: 1,155 m (3,789 ft)
- Lowest elevation: 711 m (2,333 ft)
- Population (2023): 136
  - Density: 6.21/km^{2} (16.1/sq mi)
- Time zone: UTC+01:00 (CET)
  - Summer (DST): UTC+02:00 (CEST)
- INSEE/Postal code: 43073 /43160
- ^{1} French Land Register data, which excludes lakes, ponds, glaciers > 1 km^{2} (0.386 sq mi or 247 acres) and river estuaries.

Cistrières (French pronunciation: [sistʁijɛʁ]) is a commune in the Haute-Loire department and Auvergne-Rhône-Alpes region of southeast central France.

== Population ==
Historical population
Year	Pop.	±% p.a.
1968	312	—
1975	257	−2.73%
1982	202	−3.38%
1990	160	−2.87%
1999	139	−1.55%
2007	140	+0.09%
2012	139	−0.14%
2017	140	+0.14%
2023	136	−0.48%
Source: INSEE

== See also ==
- Communes of the Haute-Loire department
