= Félines, Haute-Loire =

Félines
- Commune
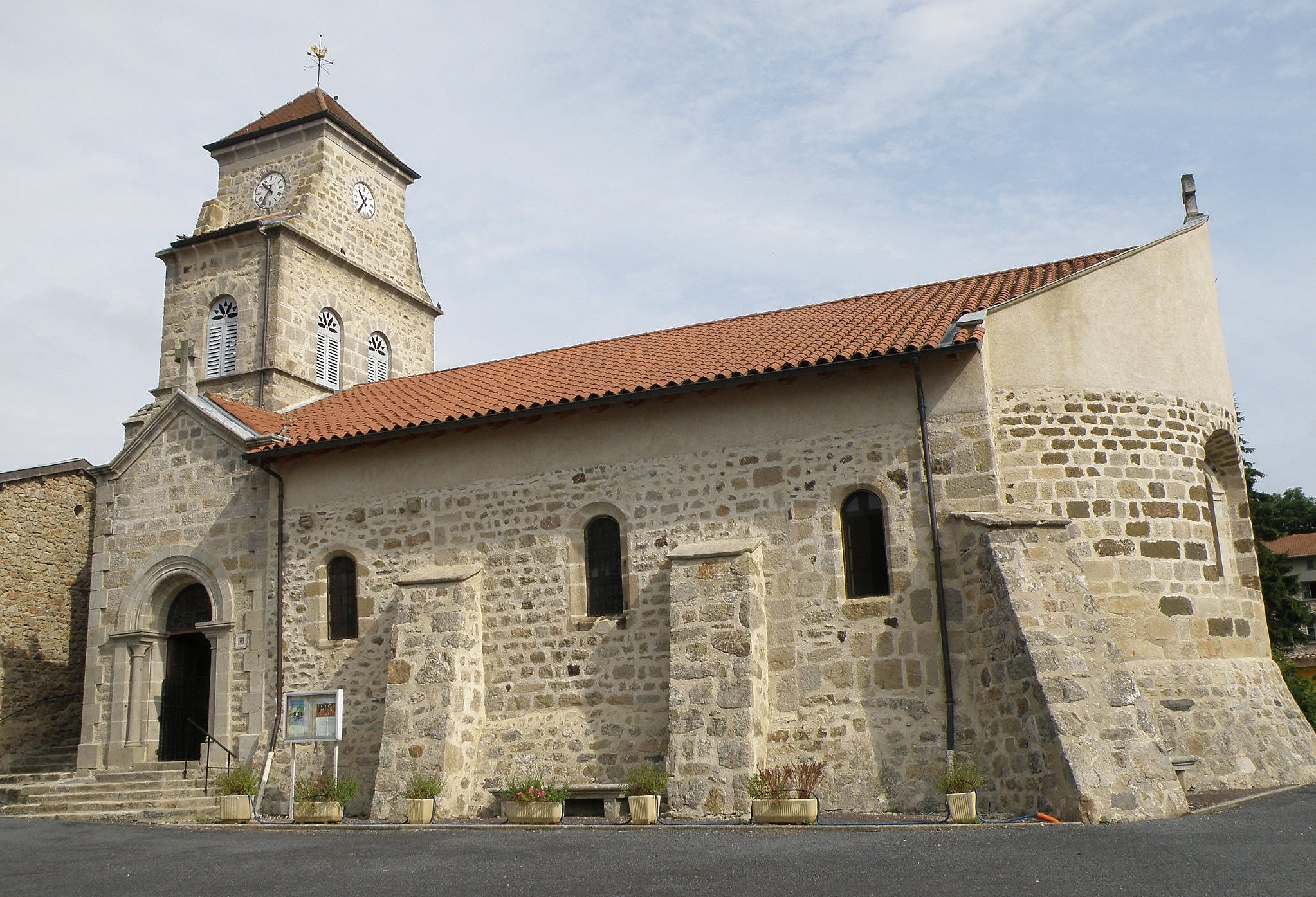

- Coat of arms
- Location of Félines
- Location within France Location within Auvergne-Rhône-Alpes
- Coordinates: 45°16′23″N 3°44′39″E
- Country: France
- Region: Auvergne-Rhône-Alpes
- Department: Haute-Loire
- Arrondissement: Brioude
- Canton: Plateau du Haut-Velay granitique
- Intercommunality: CA du Puy-en-Velay

Government
  - Mayor (2020–2026): Philippe Meyzonet
- Area^{1}: 20.5 km^{2} (7.9 sq mi)
- Elevation: 1,018 m (3,340 ft)
- Highest elevation: 1,122 m (3,681 ft)
- Lowest elevation: 958 m (3,143 ft)
- Population (2023): 298
  - Density: 14.5/km^{2} (37.6/sq mi)
- Time zone: UTC+01:00 (CET)
  - Summer (DST): UTC+02:00 (CEST)
- INSEE/Postal code: 43093 /43160
- ^{1} French Land Register data, which excludes lakes, ponds, glaciers > 1 km^{2} (0.386 sq mi or 247 acres) and river estuaries.

Félines (French pronunciation: [felin]; Occitan: Felinas) is a commune in the Haute-Loire department in south-central France.

== Climate ==
Climate data for Félines, 1014m (1991−2020 normals, extremes 1987−present)
Month	Jan	Feb	Mar	Apr	May	Jun	Jul	Aug	Sep	Oct	Nov	Dec	Year
Record high °C (°F)	19.7 (67.5)	20.7 (69.3)	22.7 (72.9)	25.8 (78.4)	30.3 (86.5)	36.3 (97.3)	35.1 (95.2)	34.7 (94.5)	31.2 (88.2)	28.1 (82.6)	21.8 (71.2)	18.9 (66.0)	36.3 (97.3)
Mean daily maximum °C (°F)	4.0 (39.2)	4.8 (40.6)	8.8 (47.8)	11.6 (52.9)	15.7 (60.3)	20.2 (68.4)	22.5 (72.5)	22.4 (72.3)	17.8 (64.0)	13.4 (56.1)	7.7 (45.9)	4.7 (40.5)	12.8 (55.0)
Daily mean °C (°F)	0.1 (32.2)	0.5 (32.9)	3.6 (38.5)	6.2 (43.2)	9.9 (49.8)	13.8 (56.8)	15.8 (60.4)	15.6 (60.1)	11.8 (53.2)	8.5 (47.3)	3.7 (38.7)	0.9 (33.6)	7.5 (45.6)
Mean daily minimum °C (°F)	−3.7 (25.3)	−3.9 (25.0)	−1.5 (29.3)	0.8 (33.4)	4.3 (39.7)	7.4 (45.3)	9.1 (48.4)	8.9 (48.0)	5.8 (42.4)	3.6 (38.5)	−0.3 (31.5)	−2.9 (26.8)	2.3 (36.1)
Record low °C (°F)	−28.4 (−19.1)	−25.1 (−13.2)	−25.3 (−13.5)	−10.9 (12.4)	−4.5 (23.9)	−2.5 (27.5)	0.4 (32.7)	−1.0 (30.2)	−2.9 (26.8)	−12.2 (10.0)	−16.3 (2.7)	−18.9 (−2.0)	−28.4 (−19.1)
Average precipitation mm (inches)	57.9 (2.28)	45.8 (1.80)	52.1 (2.05)	80.3 (3.16)	104.5 (4.11)	94.9 (3.74)	86.2 (3.39)	82.0 (3.23)	85.7 (3.37)	92.3 (3.63)	88.3 (3.48)	60.5 (2.38)	930.5 (36.62)
Average precipitation days (≥ 1.0 mm)	9.7	9.5	9.3	11.8	12.4	10.2	9.4	9.1	8.8	10.8	11.3	10.3	122.6
Source: Meteociel

== Population ==
Historical population
Year	Pop.	±% p.a.
1968	450	—
1975	382	−2.31%
1982	371	−0.42%
1990	341	−1.05%
1999	322	−0.63%
2007	290	−1.30%
2012	283	−0.49%
2017	318	+2.36%
2023	298	−1.08%
Source: INSEE

== See also ==
- Communes of the Haute-Loire department
