= Laval-sur-Doulon =

- Commune
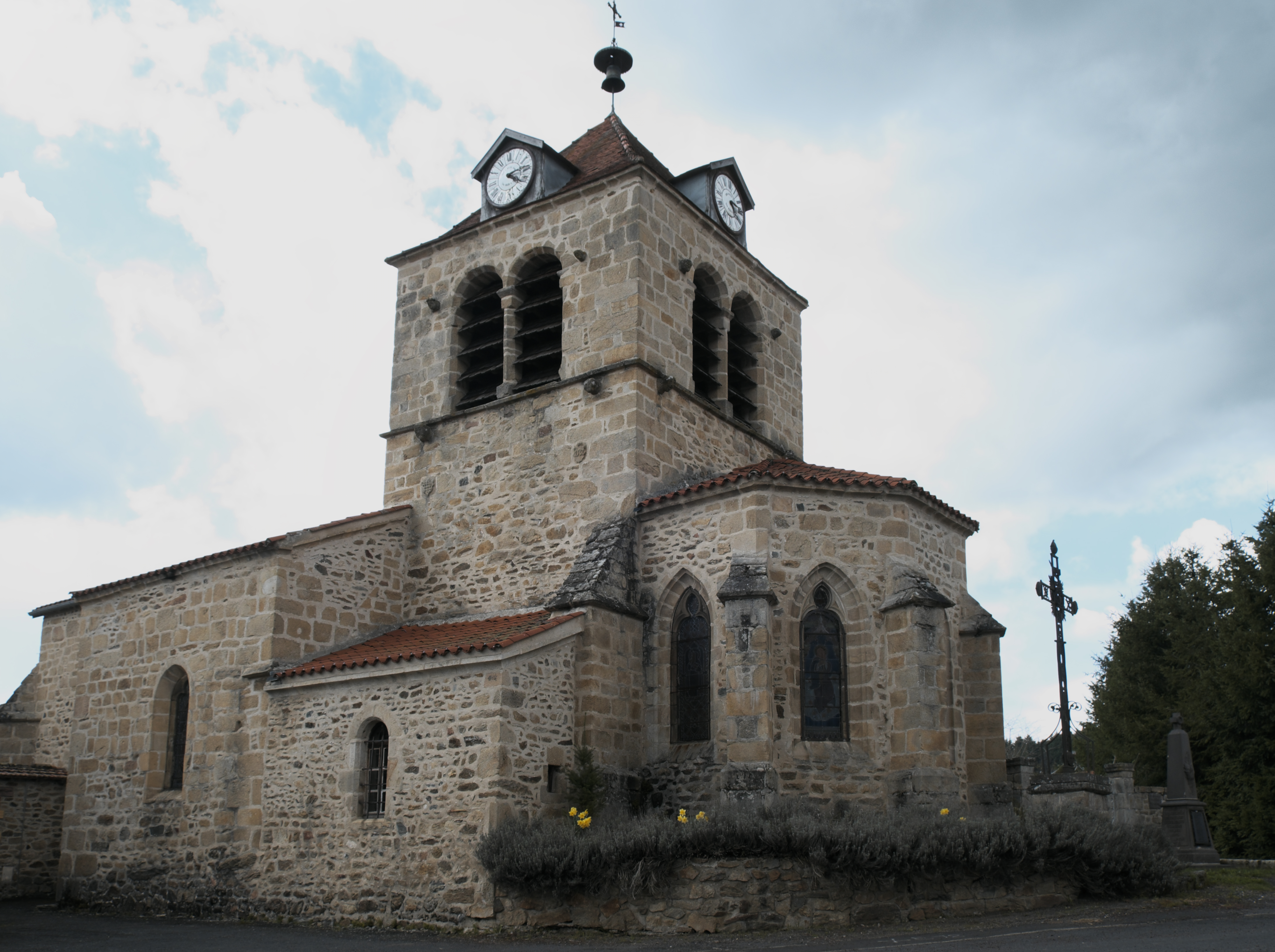
- Location of Laval-sur-Doulon
- Location within France Location within Auvergne-Rhône-Alpes
- Coordinates: 45°21′09″N 3°33′43″E
- Country: France
- Region: Auvergne-Rhône-Alpes
- Department: Haute-Loire
- Arrondissement: Brioude
- Canton: Plateau du Haut-Velay granitique
- Intercommunality: CA du Puy-en-Velay

Government
  - Mayor (2020–2026): Jean-Noël Lapeyre
- Area^{1}: 12.28 km^{2} (4.74 sq mi)
- Elevation: 732 m (2,402 ft)
- Highest elevation: 1,110 m (3,640 ft)
- Lowest elevation: 642 m (2,106 ft)
- Population (2023): 59
  - Density: 4.8/km^{2} (12/sq mi)
- Time zone: UTC+01:00 (CET)
  - Summer (DST): UTC+02:00 (CEST)
- INSEE/Postal code: 43116 /43440
- ^{1} French Land Register data, which excludes lakes, ponds, glaciers > 1 km^{2} (0.386 sq mi or 247 acres) and river estuaries.

Laval-sur-Doulon (French pronunciation: [laval syʁ dulɔ̃]) is a commune in the Haute-Loire department in south-central France.

== Population ==
Historical population
Year	Pop.	±% p.a.
1968	125	—
1975	105	−2.46%
1982	91	−2.02%
1990	63	−4.49%
1999	60	−0.54%
2007	61	+0.21%
2012	64	+0.96%
2017	63	−0.31%
2023	59	−1.09%
Source: INSEE

== See also ==
- Communes of the Haute-Loire department
