= Saint-Pierre-du-Champ =

- Commune
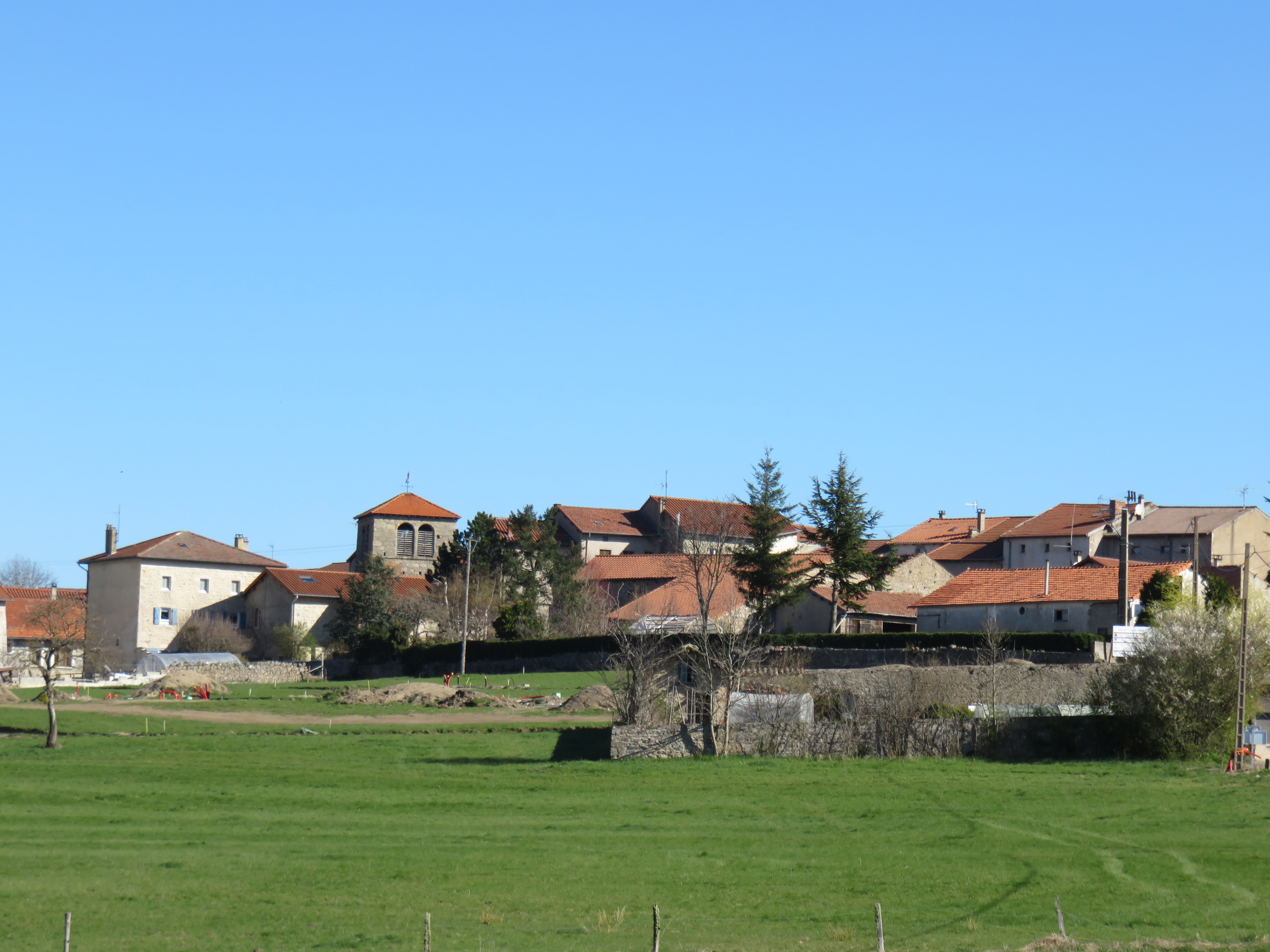
- Location of Saint-Pierre-du-Champ
- Location within France Location within Auvergne-Rhône-Alpes
- Coordinates: 45°14′56″N 3°54′00″E
- Country: France
- Region: Auvergne-Rhône-Alpes
- Department: Haute-Loire
- Arrondissement: Le Puy-en-Velay
- Canton: Plateau du Haut-Velay granitique
- Intercommunality: CA du Puy-en-Velay

Government
  - Mayor (2020–2026): Didier Dantony
- Area^{1}: 31.09 km^{2} (12.00 sq mi)
- Elevation: 950 m (3,120 ft)
- Highest elevation: 963 m (3,159 ft)
- Lowest elevation: 631 m (2,070 ft)
- Population (2023): 565
  - Density: 18.2/km^{2} (47.1/sq mi)
- Time zone: UTC+01:00 (CET)
  - Summer (DST): UTC+02:00 (CEST)
- INSEE/Postal code: 43217 /43130
- ^{1} French Land Register data, which excludes lakes, ponds, glaciers > 1 km^{2} (0.386 sq mi or 247 acres) and river estuaries.

Saint-Pierre-du-Champ (French pronunciation: [sɛ̃ pjɛʁ dy ʃɑ̃]; Auvergnat: Sent Pèire del Champ) is a commune in the Haute-Loire department in south-central France.

== Population ==
Historical population
Year	Pop.	±% p.a.
1968	715	—
1975	618	−2.06%
1982	541	−1.88%
1990	520	−0.49%
1999	520	+0.00%
2007	502	−0.44%
2012	503	+0.04%
2017	530	+1.05%
2023	565	+1.07%
Source: INSEE

== See also ==
- Communes of the Haute-Loire department
