= Chomelix =

- Commune
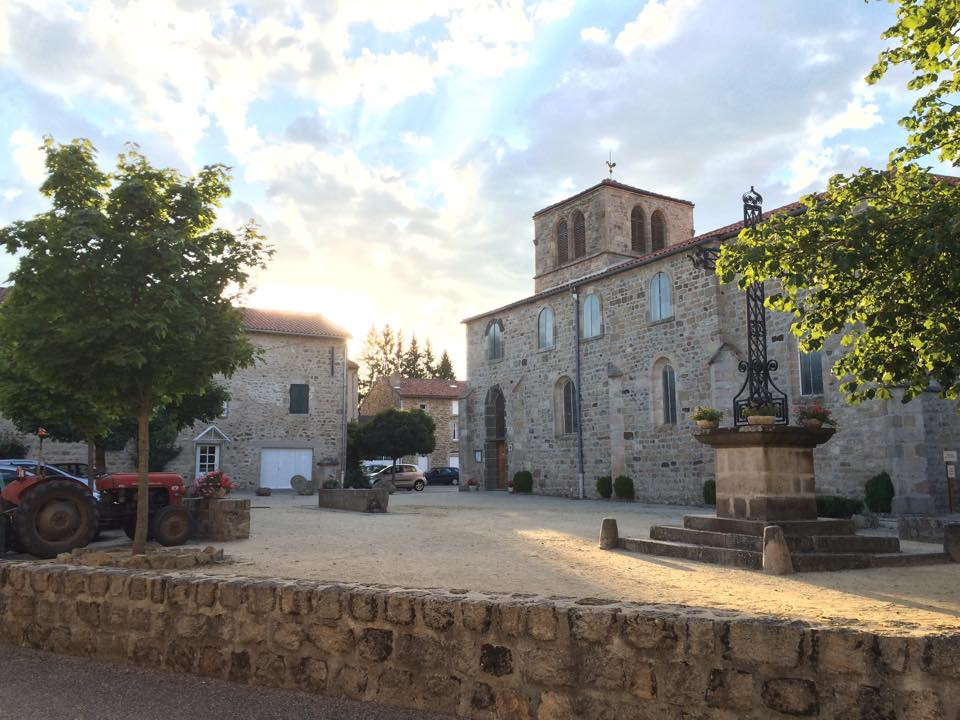
- Location of Chomelix
- Location within France Location within Auvergne-Rhône-Alpes
- Coordinates: 45°15′47″N 3°49′43″E
- Country: France
- Region: Auvergne-Rhône-Alpes
- Department: Haute-Loire
- Arrondissement: Le Puy-en-Velay
- Canton: Plateau du Haut-Velay granitique
- Intercommunality: CA du Puy-en-Velay

Government
  - Mayor (2020–2026): Roselyne Beyssac
- Area^{1}: 26.47 km^{2} (10.22 sq mi)
- Elevation: 900 m (3,000 ft)
- Highest elevation: 1,089 m (3,573 ft)
- Lowest elevation: 674 m (2,211 ft)
- Population (2023): 457
  - Density: 17.3/km^{2} (44.7/sq mi)
- Time zone: UTC+01:00 (CET)
  - Summer (DST): UTC+02:00 (CEST)
- INSEE/Postal code: 43071 /43500
- ^{1} French Land Register data, which excludes lakes, ponds, glaciers > 1 km^{2} (0.386 sq mi or 247 acres) and river estuaries.

Chomelix (French pronunciation: [ʃɔmli]; Occitan: Chomelh) is a commune in the Haute-Loire department in south-central France.

== Population ==
Historical population
Year	Pop.	±% p.a.
1968	631	—
1975	509	−3.02%
1982	438	−2.12%
1990	376	−1.89%
1999	409	+0.94%
2007	504	+2.65%
2012	488	−0.64%
2017	475	−0.54%
2023	457	−0.64%
Source: INSEE

== See also ==
- Communes of the Haute-Loire department
