= Château d'Allègre =

Castle in France

Coordinates: 45°12′06″N 3°42′40″E

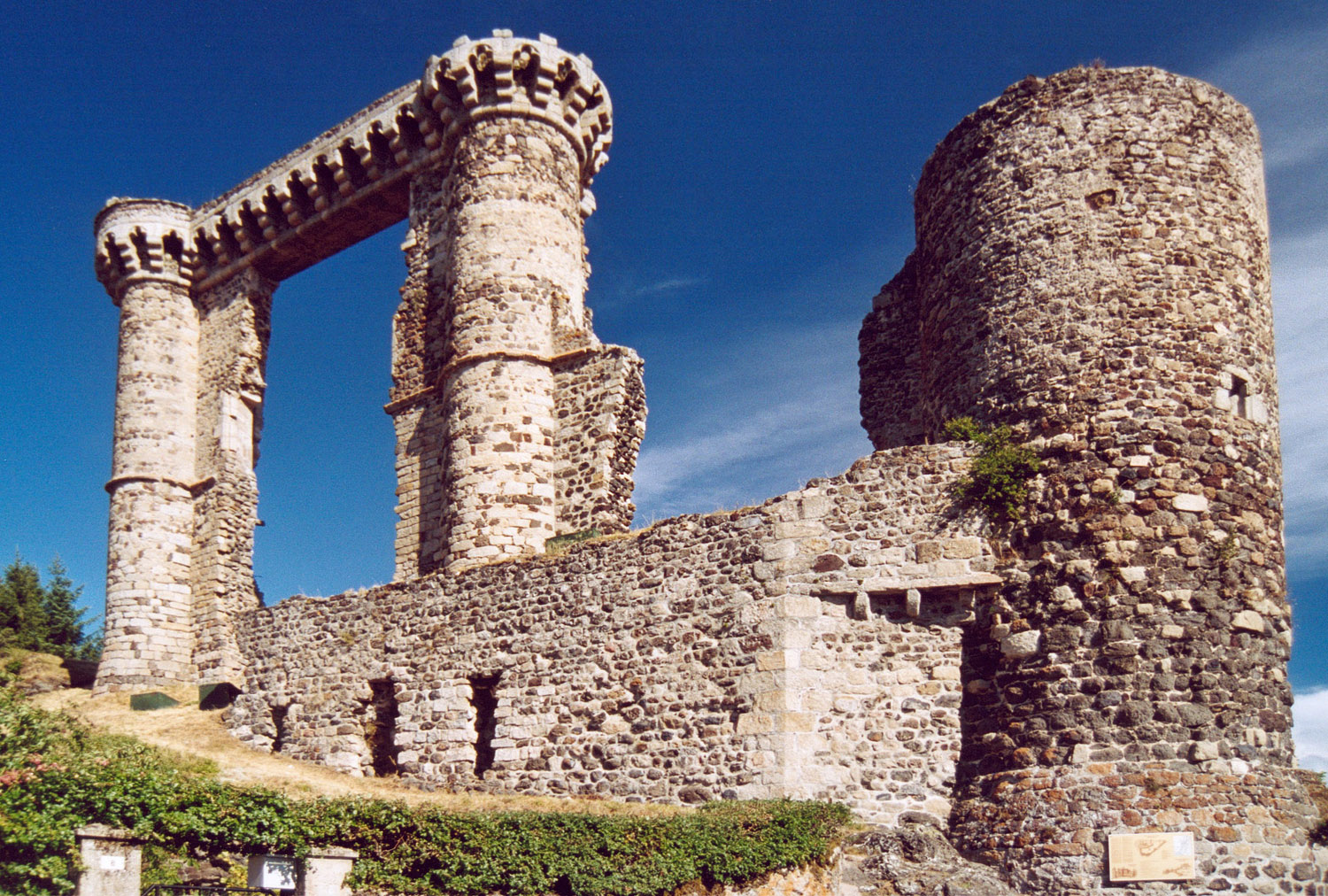
Château d'Allègre

The Château d'Allègre is a ruined castle in the commune of Allègre in the Haute-Loire département of France.

== Description ==
The ruins consist of two corner towers of the former keep, joined by a section of machicolation and round walk, and the base of a tower in the enceinte.

== History ==
The castle was the seat of the second barony of Auvergne. It was constructed towards the end of the 14th century with three fortified enceintes. It was built by Morinot de Tourzel, a favourite of the Duc de Berry, using plans drawn up by the architect Hugues Aubriot, architect of the Bastille.

The castle underwent several sieges during the Hundred Years' War and, in 1593, the war against the Catholic League. It was burned down on 15 November 1698.

The castle has been the property of the commune since the French Revolution and has been used as a source of building material. It has been protected since 1935 as a monument historique by the French Ministry of Culture.

== See also ==
- List of castles in France
