= Roche-en-Régnier =

- Commune
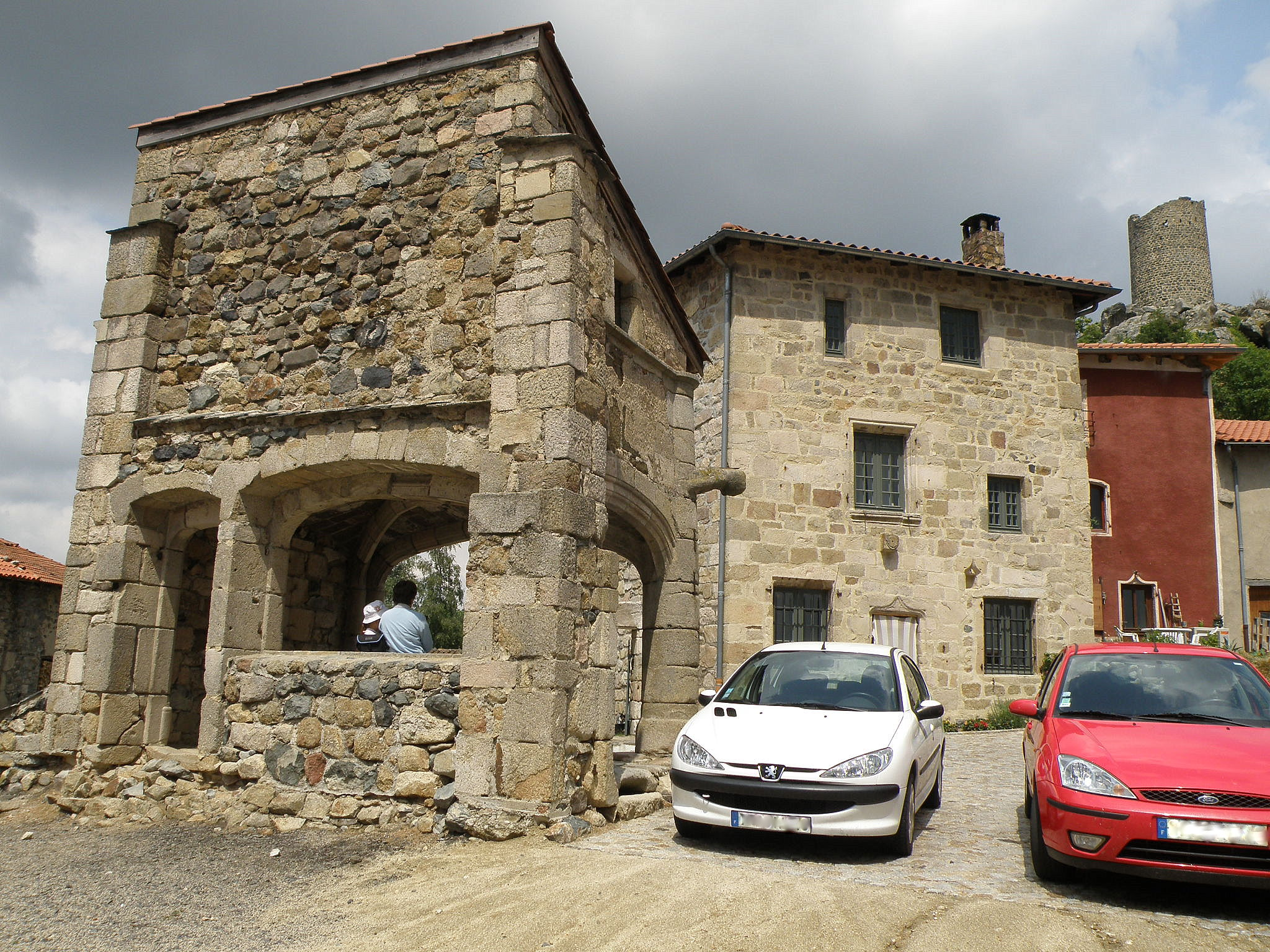

- Coat of arms
- Location of Roche-en-Régnier
- Location within France Location within Auvergne-Rhône-Alpes
- Coordinates: 45°13′20″N 3°56′32″E
- Country: France
- Region: Auvergne-Rhône-Alpes
- Department: Haute-Loire
- Arrondissement: Le Puy-en-Velay
- Canton: Plateau du Haut-Velay granitique
- Intercommunality: CA du Puy-en-Velay

Government
  - Mayor (2023–2026): David Mathieu
- Area^{1}: 26.92 km^{2} (10.39 sq mi)
- Elevation: 860 m (2,820 ft)
- Highest elevation: 1,076 m (3,530 ft)
- Lowest elevation: 504 m (1,654 ft)
- Population (2023): 476
  - Density: 17.7/km^{2} (45.8/sq mi)
- Time zone: UTC+01:00 (CET)
  - Summer (DST): UTC+02:00 (CEST)
- INSEE/Postal code: 43164 /43810
- ^{1} French Land Register data, which excludes lakes, ponds, glaciers > 1 km^{2} (0.386 sq mi or 247 acres) and river estuaries.

Roche-en-Régnier (French pronunciation: [ʁɔʃ ɑ̃ ʁeɲe]; Occitan: Ròcha de Renier) is a commune in the Haute-Loire department in south-central France. It is best known for a medieval castle and "Table d'orientation" which points out the other visible towns and hills of the Loire Valley.

== Population ==
Historical population
Year	Pop.	±% p.a.
1968	542	—
1975	447	−2.72%
1982	409	−1.26%
1990	409	+0.00%
1999	387	−0.61%
2007	481	+2.76%
2012	481	+0.00%
2017	500	+0.78%
2023	476	−0.82%
Source: INSEE

== See also ==
- Communes of the Haute-Loire department
