= Saint-Julien-d'Ance =

- Commune
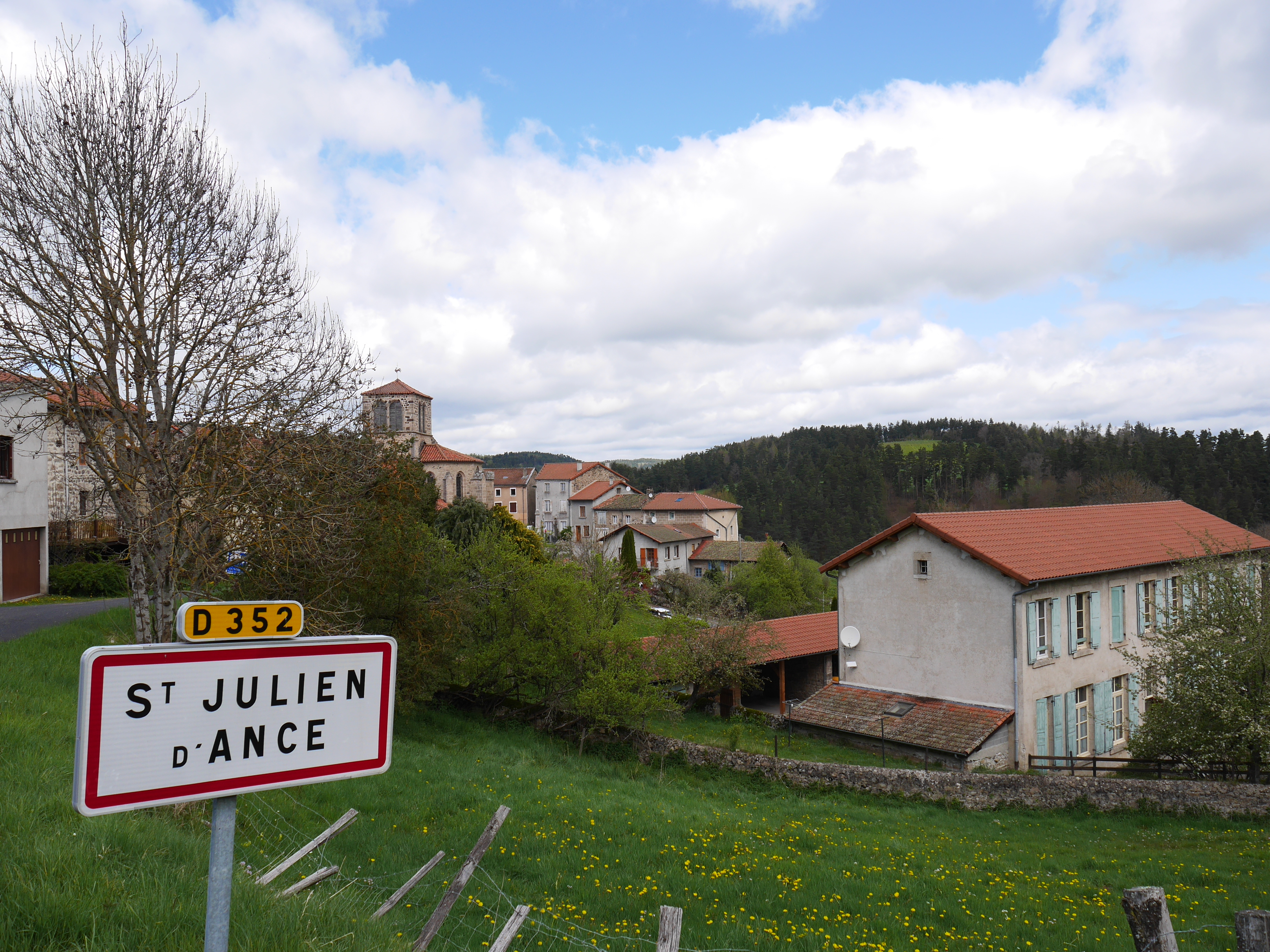
- Location of Saint-Julien-d'Ance
- Location within France Location within Auvergne-Rhône-Alpes
- Coordinates: 45°18′17″N 3°54′48″E
- Country: France
- Region: Auvergne-Rhône-Alpes
- Department: Haute-Loire
- Arrondissement: Le Puy-en-Velay
- Canton: Plateau du Haut-Velay granitique
- Intercommunality: CA du Puy-en-Velay

Government
  - Mayor (2020–2026): Gérard Triolaire
- Area^{1}: 17.82 km^{2} (6.88 sq mi)
- Elevation: 775 m (2,543 ft)
- Highest elevation: 954 m (3,130 ft)
- Lowest elevation: 653 m (2,142 ft)
- Population (2023): 245
  - Density: 13.7/km^{2} (35.6/sq mi)
- Time zone: UTC+01:00 (CET)
  - Summer (DST): UTC+02:00 (CEST)
- INSEE/Postal code: 43201 /43500
- ^{1} French Land Register data, which excludes lakes, ponds, glaciers > 1 km^{2} (0.386 sq mi or 247 acres) and river estuaries.

Saint-Julien-d'Ance (French pronunciation: [sɛ̃ ʒyljɛ̃ dɑ̃s]; Auvergnat: Sant Julian d'Ança) is a commune in the Haute-Loire department in south-central France.

== Population ==
Historical population
Year	Pop.	±% p.a.
1968	348	—
1975	263	−3.92%
1982	251	−0.66%
1990	224	−1.41%
1999	213	−0.56%
2007	232	+1.07%
2012	241	+0.76%
2017	247	+0.49%
2023	245	−0.14%
Source: INSEE

== See also ==
- Communes of the Haute-Loire department
