= Canton of Plateau du Haut-Velay granitique =

Coordinates: 45.33°N 3.85°E

The canton of Plateau du Haut-Velay granitique is an administrative division of the Haute-Loire department, south-central France. It was created at the French canton reorganisation which came into effect in March 2015. Its seat is in Craponne-sur-Arzon.

It consists of the following communes:

1. Allègre
2. Beaune-sur-Arzon
3. Berbezit
4. Bonneval
5. La Chaise-Dieu
6. La Chapelle-Bertin
7. La Chapelle-Geneste
8. Chomelix
9. Cistrières
10. Connangles
11. Craponne-sur-Arzon
12. Félines
13. Jullianges
14. Laval-sur-Doulon
15. Malvières
16. Monlet
17. Roche-en-Régnier
18. Saint-Georges-Lagricol
19. Saint-Jean-d'Aubrigoux
20. Saint-Julien-d'Ance
21. Saint-Pal-de-Chalencon
22. Saint-Pal-de-Senouire
23. Saint-Pierre-du-Champ
24. Saint-Victor-sur-Arlanc
25. Sembadel
26. Varennes-Saint-Honorat
