= Saint-Victor-sur-Arlanc =

- Commune
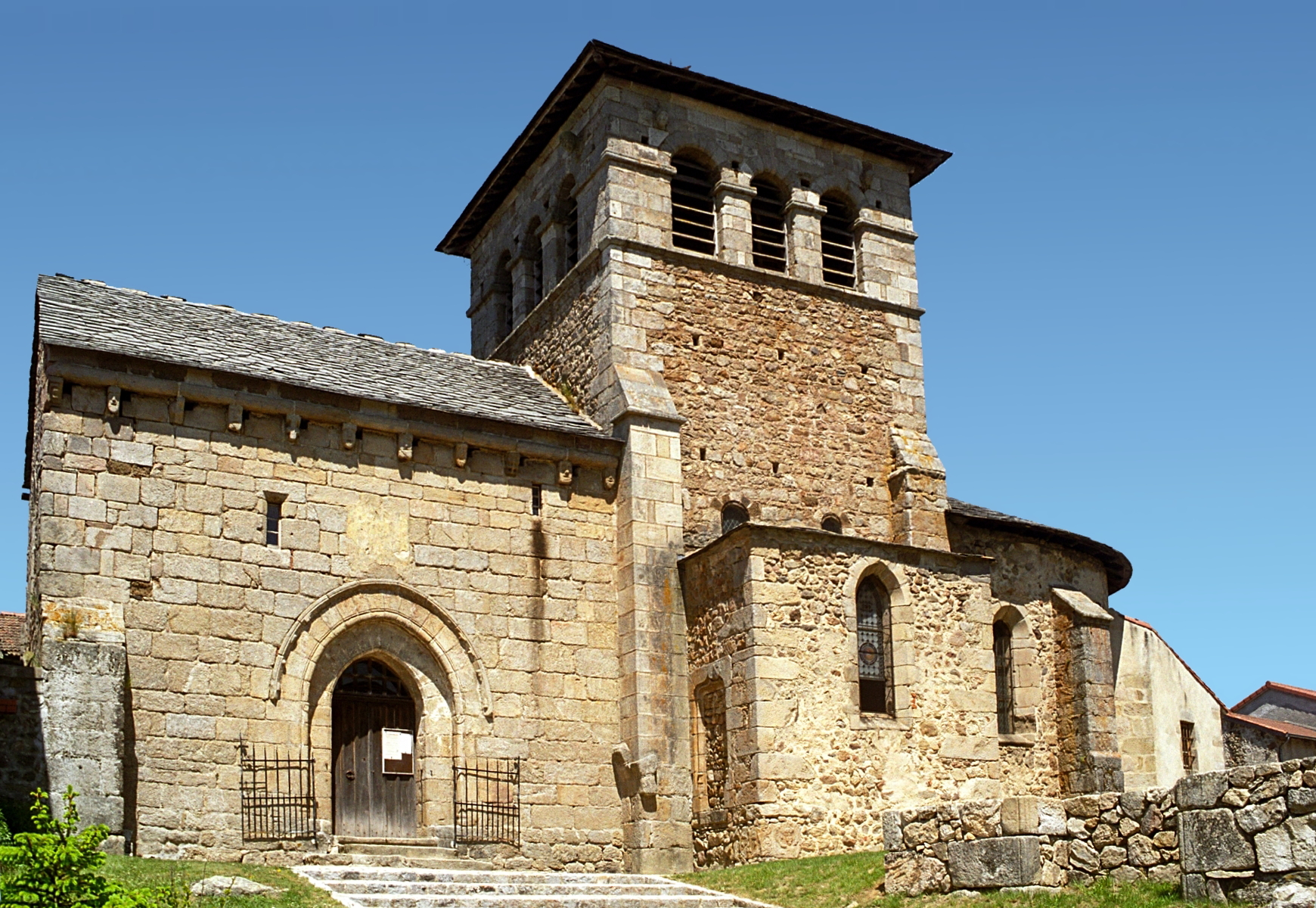
- Location of Saint-Victor-sur-Arlanc
- Location within France Location within Auvergne-Rhône-Alpes
- Coordinates: 45°20′07″N 3°46′29″E
- Country: France
- Region: Auvergne-Rhône-Alpes
- Department: Haute-Loire
- Arrondissement: Le Puy-en-Velay
- Canton: Plateau du Haut-Velay granitique
- Intercommunality: CA du Puy-en-Velay

Government
  - Mayor (2020–2026): Jean-Luc Borie
- Area^{1}: 11.88 km^{2} (4.59 sq mi)
- Elevation: 1,006 m (3,301 ft)
- Highest elevation: 1,044 m (3,425 ft)
- Lowest elevation: 659 m (2,162 ft)
- Population (2023): 92
  - Density: 7.7/km^{2} (20/sq mi)
- Time zone: UTC+01:00 (CET)
  - Summer (DST): UTC+02:00 (CEST)
- INSEE/Postal code: 43228 /43500
- ^{1} French Land Register data, which excludes lakes, ponds, glaciers > 1 km^{2} (0.386 sq mi or 247 acres) and river estuaries.

Saint-Victor-sur-Arlanc (French pronunciation: [sɛ̃ viktɔʁ syʁ aʁlɑ̃], literally Saint-Victor on Arlanc; Occitan: Sent Victor d'Alanc) is a commune in the Haute-Loire department in south-central France.

== Population ==
Historical population
Year	Pop.	±% p.a.
1968	185	—
1975	144	−3.52%
1982	128	−1.67%
1990	111	−1.77%
1999	107	−0.41%
2007	105	−0.24%
2012	95	−1.98%
2017	89	−1.30%
2023	92	+0.55%
Source: INSEE

== See also ==
- Communes of the Haute-Loire department
