= Champis, Ardèche =

Champis
- Commune
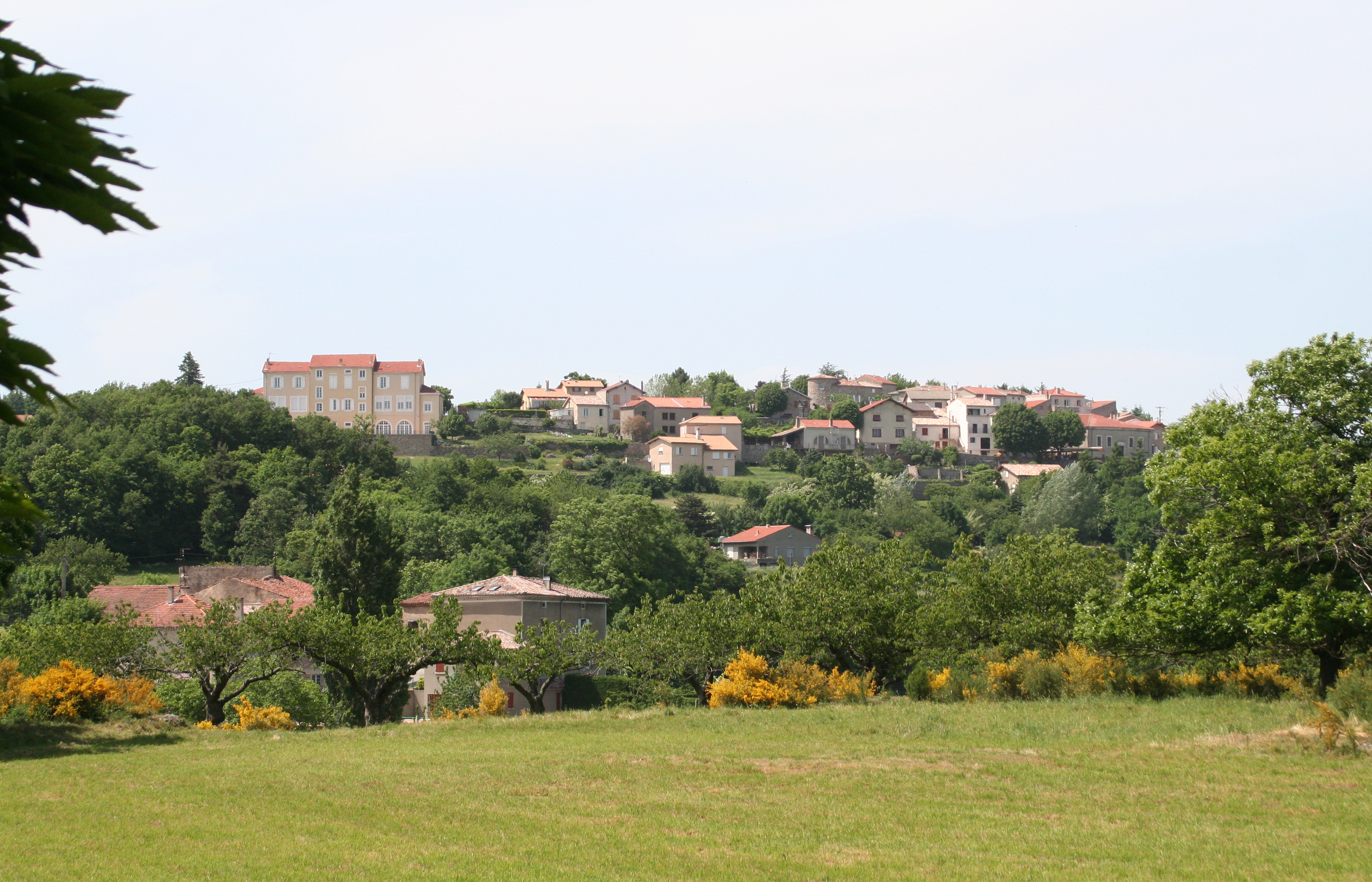
- A general view of Champis
- Location of Champis
- Location within France Location within Auvergne-Rhône-Alpes
- Coordinates: 44°57′39″N 4°44′03″E
- Country: France
- Region: Auvergne-Rhône-Alpes
- Department: Ardèche
- Arrondissement: Tournon-sur-Rhône
- Canton: Haut-Vivarais

Government
  - Mayor (2020–2026): Denis Dupin
- Area^{1}: 16.34 km^{2} (6.31 sq mi)
- Elevation: 550 m (1,800 ft)
- Highest elevation: 652 m (2,139 ft)
- Lowest elevation: 346 m (1,135 ft)
- Population (2023): 680
  - Density: 42/km^{2} (110/sq mi)
- Time zone: UTC+01:00 (CET)
  - Summer (DST): UTC+02:00 (CEST)
- INSEE/Postal code: 07052 /07440
- ^{1} French Land Register data, which excludes lakes, ponds, glaciers > 1 km^{2} (0.386 sq mi or 247 acres) and river estuaries.

Champis (Occitan: Champignons) is a commune of the Ardèche department in southern France.

== Population ==
Historical population
Year	Pop.	±% p.a.
1968	488	—
1975	420	−2.12%
1982	332	−3.30%
1990	407	+2.58%
1999	442	+0.92%
2007	558	+2.96%
2012	595	+1.29%
2017	623	+0.92%
2023	680	+1.47%
Source: INSEE

== See also ==
- Communes of the Ardèche department
