= Allègre =

- Commune
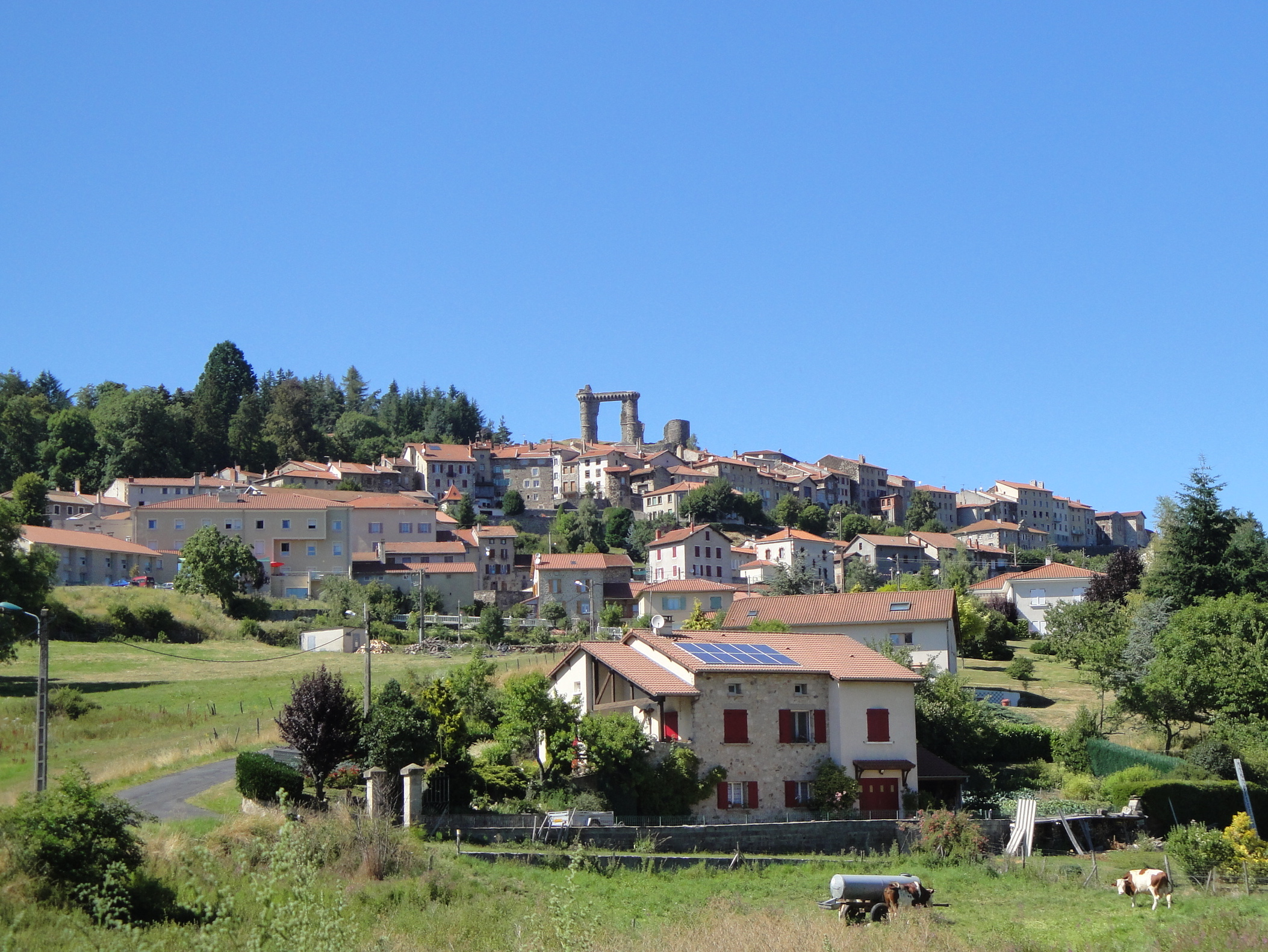

- Coat of arms
- Location of Allègre
- Location within France Location within Auvergne-Rhône-Alpes
- Coordinates: 45°12′01″N 3°42′45″E
- Country: France
- Region: Auvergne-Rhône-Alpes
- Department: Haute-Loire
- Arrondissement: Le Puy-en-Velay
- Canton: Plateau du Haut-Velay granitique
- Intercommunality: CA du Puy-en-Velay

Government
  - Mayor (2020–2026): Gilbert Meyssonnier
- Area^{1}: 23.57 km^{2} (9.10 sq mi)
- Elevation: 1,050 m (3,440 ft)
- Highest elevation: 1,172 m (3,845 ft)
- Lowest elevation: 880 m (2,890 ft)
- Population (2023): 922
  - Density: 39.1/km^{2} (101/sq mi)
- Time zone: UTC+01:00 (CET)
  - Summer (DST): UTC+02:00 (CEST)
- INSEE/Postal code: 43003 /43270
- ^{1} French Land Register data, which excludes lakes, ponds, glaciers > 1 km^{2} (0.386 sq mi or 247 acres) and river estuaries.

Allègre (French pronunciation: [alɛɡʁ]; Occitan: Alègre) is a commune in the Haute-Loire department in south-central France.

== Population ==
Historical population
Year	Pop.	±% p.a.
1968	1,512	—
1975	1,459	−0.51%
1982	1,313	−1.49%
1990	1,176	−1.37%
1999	1,007	−1.71%
2007	1,008	+0.01%
2012	968	−0.81%
2017	907	−1.29%
2023	922	+0.27%
Source: INSEE

== Sights ==
- Château d'Allègre: ruined castle, protected since 1935 as a monument historique

== Personalities ==
- Germaine Tillion (30 May 1907 – 19 April 2008), French anthropologist, was born in Allègre. She was interred at the Panthéon in Paris on May 27, 2015, for her role in the French Resistance.

== Twin towns – sister cities ==
Allègre is twinned with Krostitz, Germany.

== See also ==
- Communes of the Haute-Loire department
