= Job, Puy-de-Dôme =

Job
- Commune
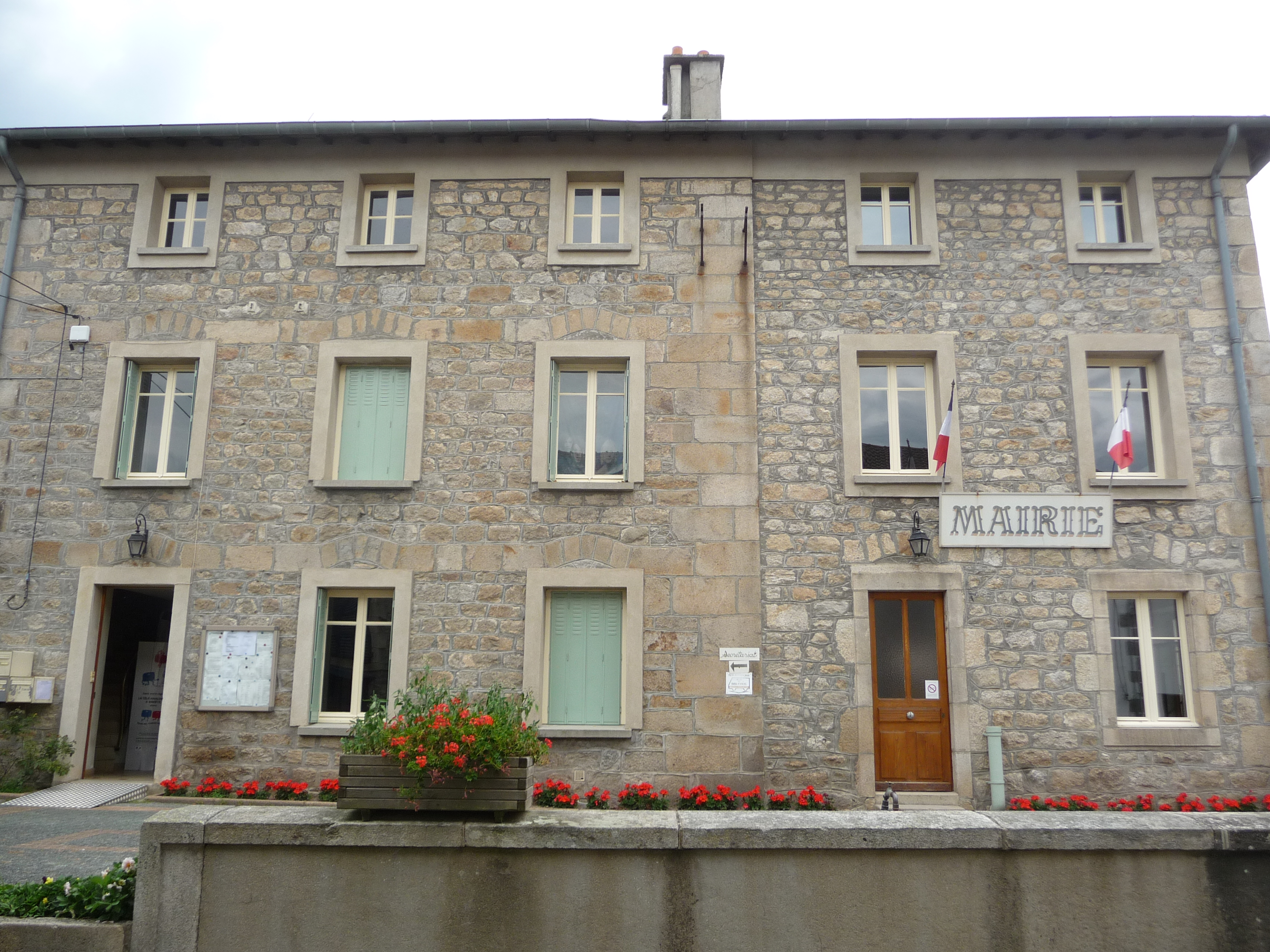
- The town hall in Job

- Coat of arms
- Location of Job
- Location within France Location within Auvergne-Rhône-Alpes
- Coordinates: 45°37′01″N 3°44′46″E
- Country: France
- Region: Auvergne-Rhône-Alpes
- Department: Puy-de-Dôme
- Arrondissement: Ambert
- Canton: Ambert
- Intercommunality: Ambert Livradois Forez

Government
  - Mayor (2026–32): François Dauphin
- Area^{1}: 42.68 km^{2} (16.48 sq mi)
- Elevation: 630 m (2,070 ft)
- Highest elevation: 1,631 m (5,351 ft)
- Lowest elevation: 492 m (1,614 ft)
- Population (2023): 1,016
  - Density: 23.81/km^{2} (61.65/sq mi)
- Time zone: UTC+01:00 (CET)
  - Summer (DST): UTC+02:00 (CEST)
- INSEE/Postal code: 63179 /63990
- ^{1} French Land Register data, which excludes lakes, ponds, glaciers > 1 km^{2} (0.386 sq mi or 247 acres) and river estuaries.

Job (French pronunciation: [ʒɔb]) is a commune in the Puy-de-Dôme department in Auvergne in central France.

== See also ==
- Communes of the Puy-de-Dôme department
