= Varennes-Saint-Honorat =

- Commune
- Location of Varennes-Saint-Honorat
- Location within France Location within Auvergne-Rhône-Alpes
- Coordinates: 45°10′49″N 3°38′21″E
- Country: France
- Region: Auvergne-Rhône-Alpes
- Department: Haute-Loire
- Arrondissement: Le Puy-en-Velay
- Canton: Plateau du Haut-Velay granitique

Government
  - Mayor (2020–2026): Robert Besse
- Area^{1}: 11.91 km^{2} (4.60 sq mi)
- Elevation: 1,129 m (3,704 ft)
- Highest elevation: 1,174 m (3,852 ft)
- Lowest elevation: 720 m (2,360 ft)
- Population (2023): 26
  - Density: 2.2/km^{2} (5.7/sq mi)
- Time zone: UTC+01:00 (CET)
  - Summer (DST): UTC+02:00 (CEST)
- INSEE/Postal code: 43252 /43270
- ^{1} French Land Register data, which excludes lakes, ponds, glaciers > 1 km^{2} (0.386 sq mi or 247 acres) and river estuaries.

Varennes-Saint-Honorat (French pronunciation: [vaʁɛn sɛ̃.t‿ɔnɔʁa]; Occitan: Varenas de Sent Onorat) is a commune in the Haute-Loire department in south-central France.

== Population ==
Historical population
Year	Pop.	±% p.a.
1968	90	—
1975	64	−4.75%
1982	46	−4.61%
1990	46	+0.00%
1999	39	−1.82%
2007	39	+0.00%
2012	31	−4.49%
2017	24	−4.99%
2023	26	+1.34%
Source: INSEE

== See also ==
- Communes of the Haute-Loire department
