= Saint-Georges-Lagricol =

- Commune
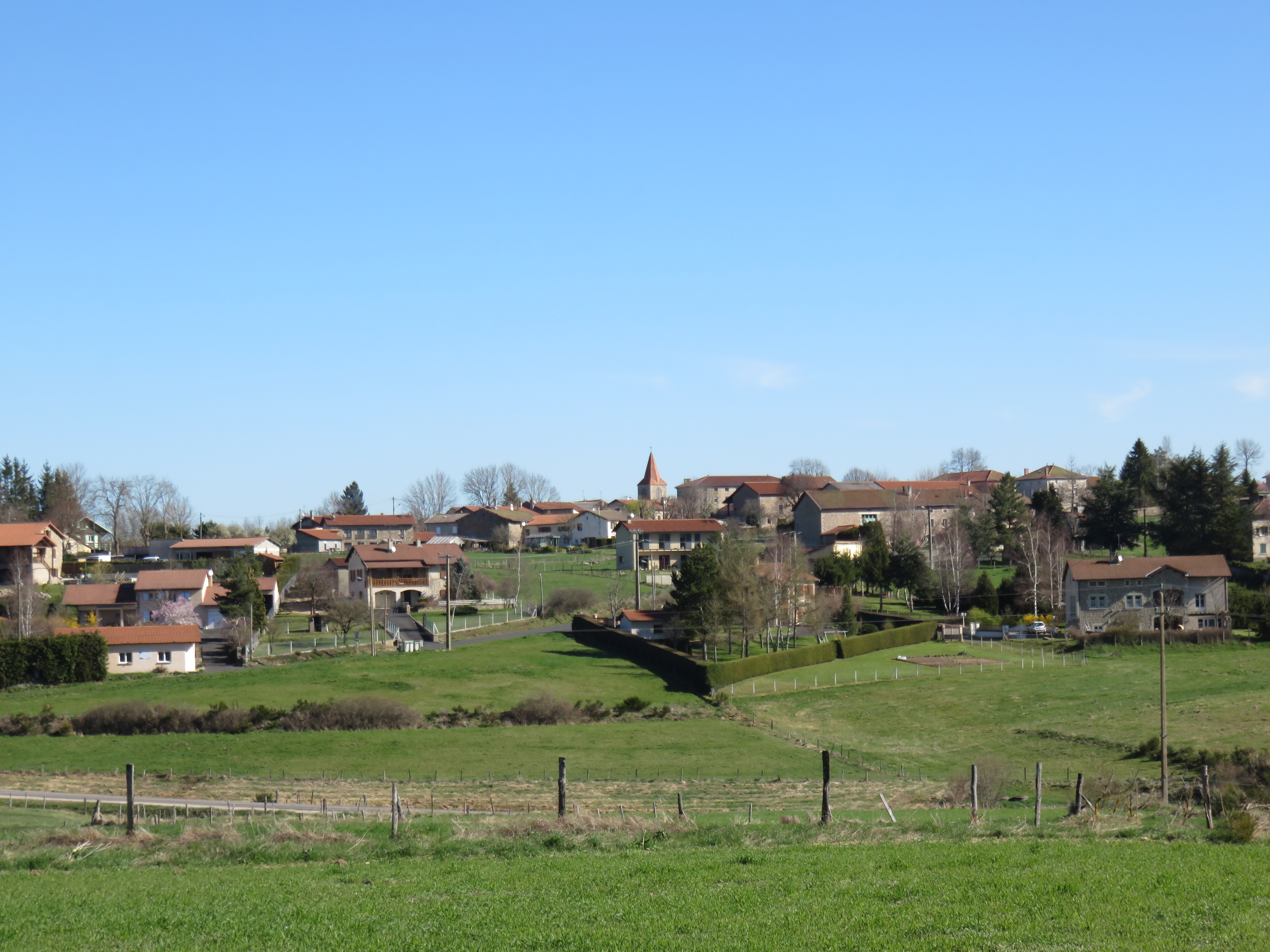
- Location of Saint-Georges-Lagricol
- Location within France Location within Auvergne-Rhône-Alpes
- Coordinates: 45°17′56″N 3°53′13″E
- Country: France
- Region: Auvergne-Rhône-Alpes
- Department: Haute-Loire
- Arrondissement: Le Puy-en-Velay
- Canton: Plateau du Haut-Velay granitique
- Intercommunality: CA du Puy-en-Velay

Government
  - Mayor (2020–2026): André Roche
- Area^{1}: 19.17 km^{2} (7.40 sq mi)
- Elevation: 850 m (2,790 ft)
- Highest elevation: 963 m (3,159 ft)
- Lowest elevation: 743 m (2,438 ft)
- Population (2023): 518
  - Density: 27.0/km^{2} (70.0/sq mi)
- Time zone: UTC+01:00 (CET)
  - Summer (DST): UTC+02:00 (CEST)
- INSEE/Postal code: 43189 /43500
- ^{1} French Land Register data, which excludes lakes, ponds, glaciers > 1 km^{2} (0.386 sq mi or 247 acres) and river estuaries.

Saint-Georges-Lagricol (French pronunciation: [sɛ̃ ʒɔʁʒ laɡʁikɔl]; Occitan: Sent Jòrdi l'Agricòl) is a commune in the Haute-Loire department in south-central France.

== Population ==
Historical population
Year	Pop.	±% p.a.
1968	446	—
1975	447	+0.03%
1982	411	−1.19%
1990	400	−0.34%
1999	411	+0.30%
2007	463	+1.50%
2012	509	+1.91%
2017	527	+0.70%
2023	518	−0.29%
Source: INSEE

== See also ==
- Communes of the Haute-Loire department
