= Jullianges =

- Commune
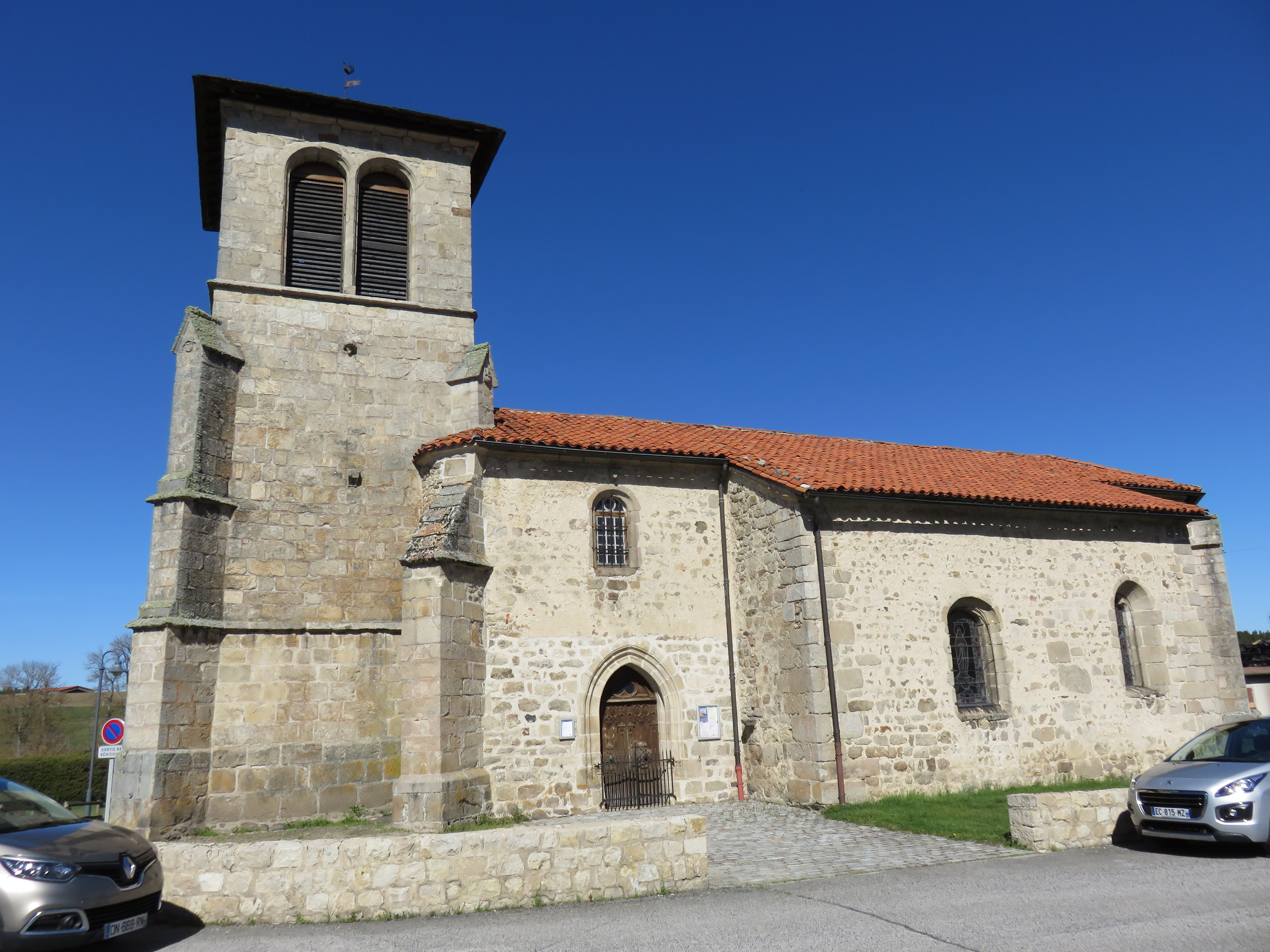
- Location of Jullianges
- Location within France Location within Auvergne-Rhône-Alpes
- Coordinates: 45°18′26″N 3°47′31″E
- Country: France
- Region: Auvergne-Rhône-Alpes
- Department: Haute-Loire
- Arrondissement: Le Puy-en-Velay
- Canton: Plateau du Haut-Velay granitique
- Intercommunality: CA du Puy-en-Velay

Government
  - Mayor (2020–2026): Bernard Brignon
- Area^{1}: 18.44 km^{2} (7.12 sq mi)
- Elevation: 958 m (3,143 ft)
- Highest elevation: 1,089 m (3,573 ft)
- Lowest elevation: 838 m (2,749 ft)
- Population (2023): 426
  - Density: 23.1/km^{2} (59.8/sq mi)
- Time zone: UTC+01:00 (CET)
  - Summer (DST): UTC+02:00 (CEST)
- INSEE/Postal code: 43108 /43500
- ^{1} French Land Register data, which excludes lakes, ponds, glaciers > 1 km^{2} (0.386 sq mi or 247 acres) and river estuaries.

Jullianges (French pronunciation: [ʒyljɑ̃ʒ]; Occitan: Julhanja) is a commune in the Haute-Loire department in south-central France.

== Population ==
Historical population
Year	Pop.	±% p.a.
1968	529	—
1975	439	−2.63%
1982	402	−1.25%
1990	343	−1.96%
1999	382	+1.20%
2007	413	+0.98%
2012	461	+2.22%
2017	442	−0.84%
2023	426	−0.61%
Source: INSEE

== See also ==
- Communes of the Haute-Loire department
