= Saint-Jean-d'Aubrigoux =

- Commune
- Location of Saint-Jean-d'Aubrigoux
- Location within France Location within Auvergne-Rhône-Alpes
- Coordinates: 45°21′43″N 3°48′51″E
- Country: France
- Region: Auvergne-Rhône-Alpes
- Department: Haute-Loire
- Arrondissement: Le Puy-en-Velay
- Canton: Plateau du Haut-Velay granitique
- Intercommunality: CA du Puy-en-Velay

Government
  - Mayor (2020–2026): Pierrette Bouthéron
- Area^{1}: 17.8 km^{2} (6.9 sq mi)
- Elevation: 948 m (3,110 ft)
- Highest elevation: 1,191 m (3,907 ft)
- Lowest elevation: 880 m (2,890 ft)
- Population (2023): 184
  - Density: 10.3/km^{2} (26.8/sq mi)
- Time zone: UTC+01:00 (CET)
  - Summer (DST): UTC+02:00 (CEST)
- INSEE/Postal code: 43196 /43500
- ^{1} French Land Register data, which excludes lakes, ponds, glaciers > 1 km^{2} (0.386 sq mi or 247 acres) and river estuaries.

Saint-Jean-d'Aubrigoux (French pronunciation: [sɛ̃ ʒɑ̃ dobʁiɡu]; Auvergnat: Sant Joan d'Abrigós) is a commune in the Haute-Loire department in south-central France.

== Population ==
Historical population
Year	Pop.	±% p.a.
1968	356	—
1975	314	−1.78%
1982	301	−0.60%
1990	260	−1.81%
1999	184	−3.77%
2007	179	−0.34%
2012	189	+1.09%
2017	177	−1.30%
2023	184	+0.65%
Source: INSEE

== See also ==
- Communes of the Haute-Loire department
