= Saint-Pal-de-Chalencon =

- Commune
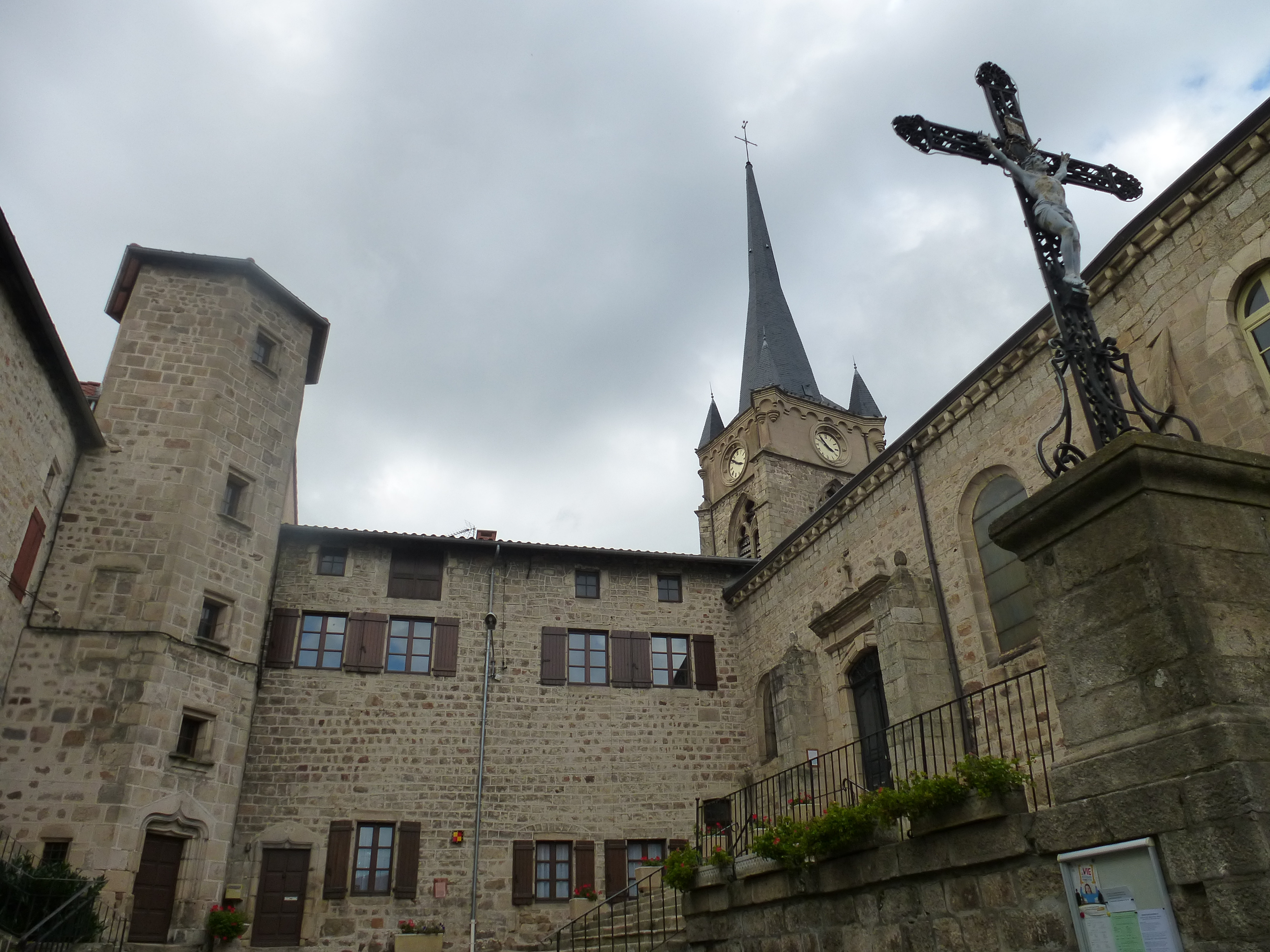

- Coat of arms
- Location of Saint-Pal-de-Chalencon
- Location within France Location within Auvergne-Rhône-Alpes
- Coordinates: 45°21′27″N 3°57′27″E
- Country: France
- Region: Auvergne-Rhône-Alpes
- Department: Haute-Loire
- Arrondissement: Yssingeaux
- Canton: Plateau du Haut-Velay granitique

Government
  - Mayor (2020–2026): Pierre Brun
- Area^{1}: 28.95 km^{2} (11.18 sq mi)
- Elevation: 878 m (2,881 ft)
- Highest elevation: 978 m (3,209 ft)
- Lowest elevation: 700 m (2,300 ft)
- Population (2023): 1,038
  - Density: 35.85/km^{2} (92.86/sq mi)
- Time zone: UTC+01:00 (CET)
  - Summer (DST): UTC+02:00 (CEST)
- INSEE/Postal code: 43212 /43500
- ^{1} French Land Register data, which excludes lakes, ponds, glaciers > 1 km^{2} (0.386 sq mi or 247 acres) and river estuaries.

Saint-Pal-de-Chalencon (French pronunciation: [sɛ̃ pal də ʃalɑ̃kɔ̃]) is a commune in the Haute-Loire department in south-central France.

== Population ==
Historical population
Year	Pop.	±% p.a.
1968	1,206	—
1975	1,039	−2.11%
1982	1,043	+0.05%
1990	1,029	−0.17%
1999	1,046	+0.18%
2007	1,014	−0.39%
2012	1,027	+0.26%
2017	1,016	−0.22%
2023	1,038	+0.36%
Source: INSEE

== See also ==
- Communes of the Haute-Loire department
