= Saint-Éloy-la-Glacière =

- Commune
- Location of Saint-Éloy-la-Glacière
- Location within France Location within Auvergne-Rhône-Alpes
- Coordinates: 45°33′42″N 3°34′28″E
- Country: France
- Region: Auvergne-Rhône-Alpes
- Department: Puy-de-Dôme
- Arrondissement: Ambert
- Canton: Les Monts du Livradois
- Intercommunality: Haut-Livradois

Government
  - Mayor (2026–32): Mickael Coupat
- Area^{1}: 12.02 km^{2} (4.64 sq mi)
- Elevation: 1,050 m (3,440 ft)
- Highest elevation: 1,118 m (3,668 ft)
- Lowest elevation: 854 m (2,802 ft)
- Population (2023): 63
  - Density: 5.2/km^{2} (14/sq mi)
- Time zone: UTC+01:00 (CET)
  - Summer (DST): UTC+02:00 (CEST)
- INSEE/Postal code: 63337 /63890
- ^{1} French Land Register data, which excludes lakes, ponds, glaciers > 1 km^{2} (0.386 sq mi or 247 acres) and river estuaries.

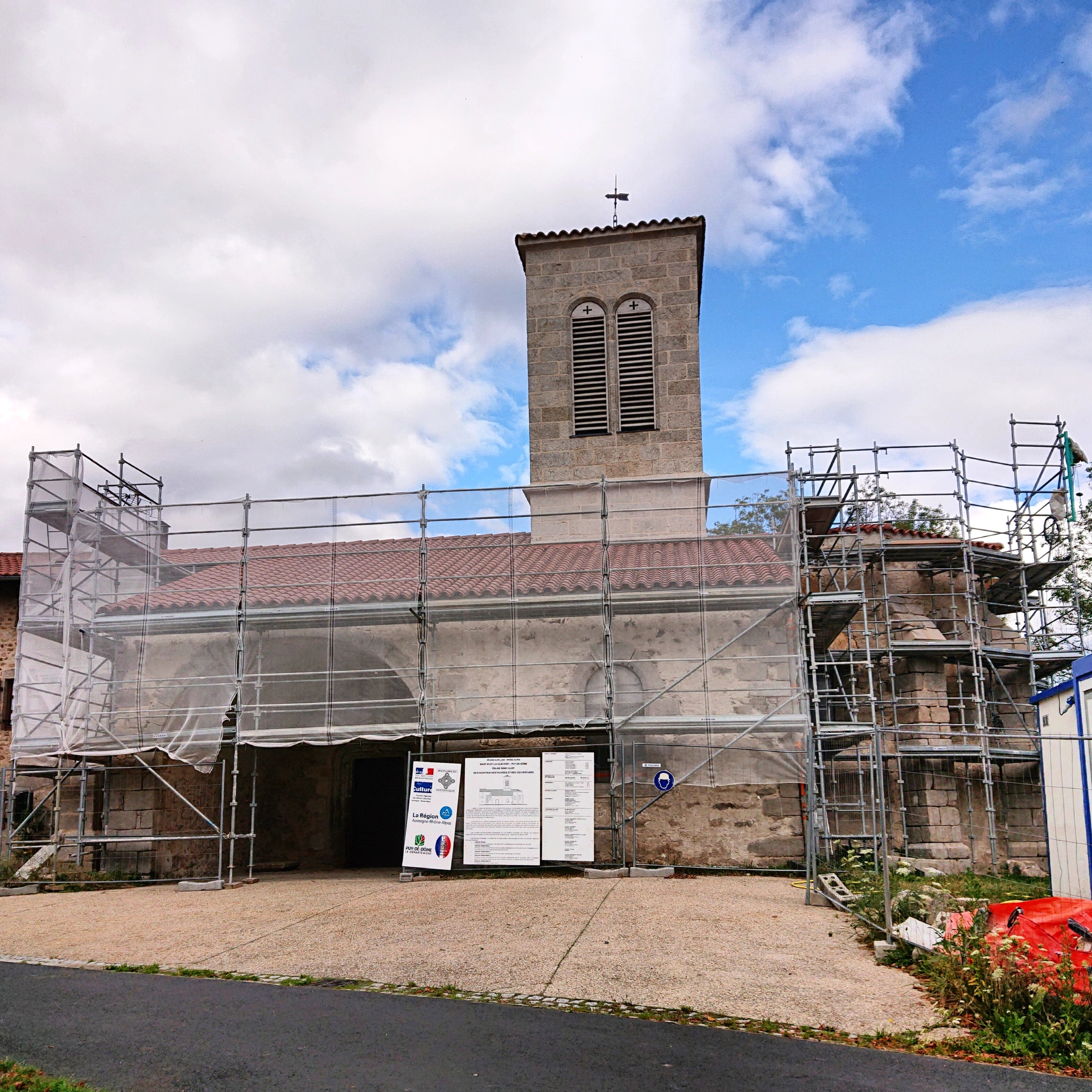
Saint-Éloy-la-Glacière

Saint-Éloy-la-Glacière (French pronunciation: [sɛ̃.t‿elwa la glasjɛʁ]; Occitan: Sent Alòi de la Glaciera) is a commune in the Puy-de-Dôme department in Auvergne in central France. It is a member commune of the Parc naturel régional Livradois-Forez.

== Geography ==
The commune Saint-Éloy-la-Glacière contains the following localities: Les Amouillaux, Le Bourg, La Faye (shared with the commune of Échandelys), Le Griffol, Montgheol, Montgrain, Le Redondet, Sagne Neyre, Les Salles and La Vaisse (shared with the commune of Auzelles).

It borders on the following communes, clockwise from the north:

- Auzelles
- Saint-Amant-Roche-Savine
- Fournols
- Échandelys

== Population ==
Historical population

Year	Pop.	±% p.a.
1793	550	—
1846	604	+0.18%
1881	411	−1.09%
1901	351	−0.79%
1921	293	−0.90%
1946	172	−2.11%
1962	113	−2.59%
1968	86	−4.45%

Year	Pop.	±% p.a.
1975	82	−0.68%
1982	58	−4.83%
1990	54	−0.89%
1999	59	+0.99%
2007	62	+0.62%
2012	64	+0.64%
2017	56	−2.64%
2023	63	+1.98%

Source: EHESS and INSEE

== See also ==
- Communes of the Puy-de-Dôme department
