= Auzelles =

- Commune
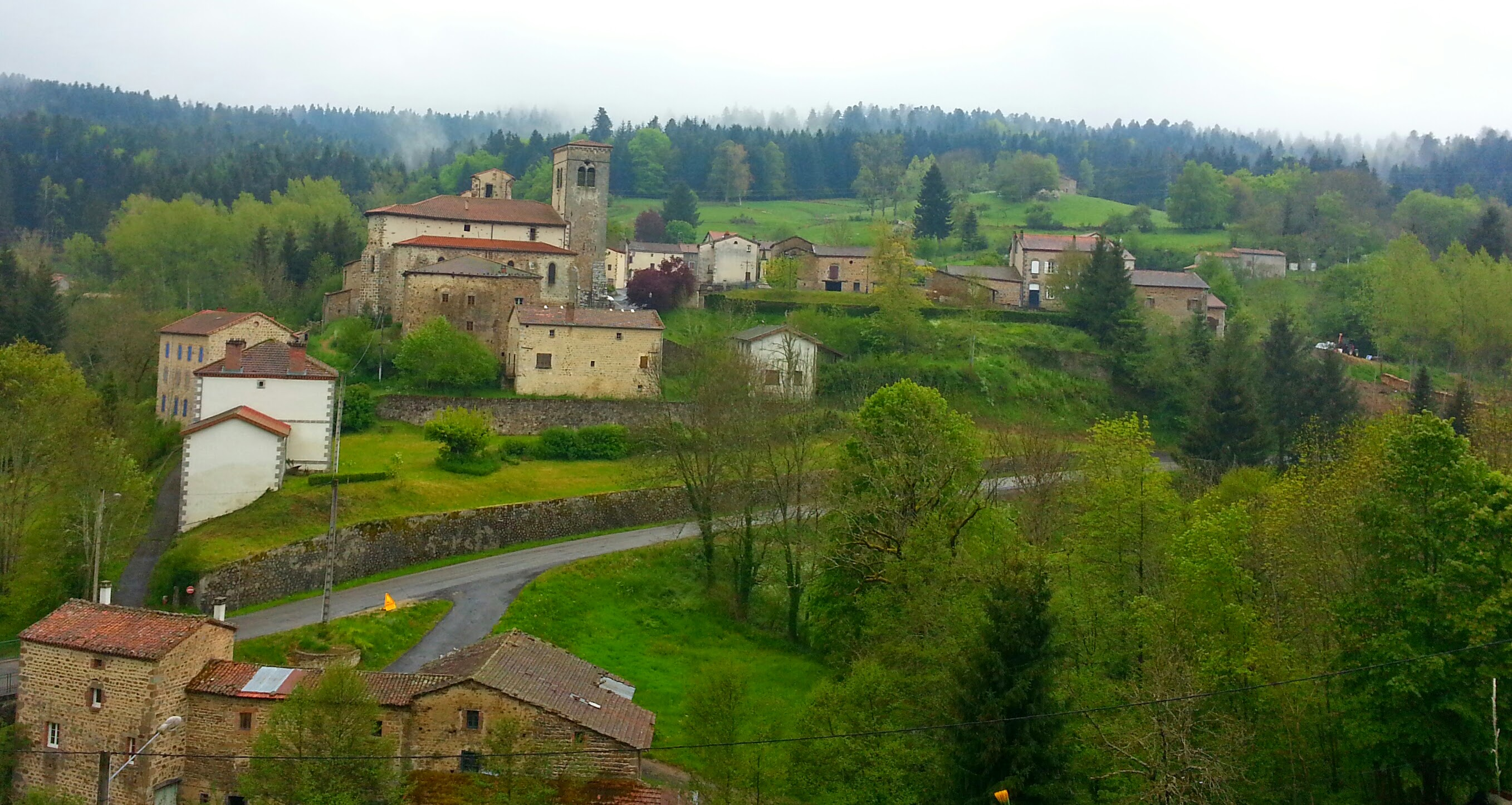
- A general view of Auzelles

- Coat of arms
- Location of Auzelles
- Location within France Location within Auvergne-Rhône-Alpes
- Coordinates: 45°36′10″N 3°30′37″E
- Country: France
- Region: Auvergne-Rhône-Alpes
- Department: Puy-de-Dôme
- Arrondissement: Ambert
- Canton: Les Monts du Livradois
- Intercommunality: CC Ambert Livradois Forez

Government
  - Mayor (2026–32): Marie-Laure Nunes
- Area^{1}: 33.42 km^{2} (12.90 sq mi)
- Elevation: 730 m (2,400 ft)
- Highest elevation: 1,064 m (3,491 ft)
- Lowest elevation: 449 m (1,473 ft)
- Population (2023): 391
  - Density: 11.7/km^{2} (30.3/sq mi)
- Time zone: UTC+01:00 (CET)
  - Summer (DST): UTC+02:00 (CEST)
- INSEE/Postal code: 63023 /63590
- ^{1} French Land Register data, which excludes lakes, ponds, glaciers > 1 km^{2} (0.386 sq mi or 247 acres) and river estuaries.

Auzelles (French pronunciation: [ozɛl]) is a commune in the Puy-de-Dôme department in Auvergne-Rhône-Alpes in central France.

== Population ==
Historical population
Year	Pop.	±% p.a.
1968	465	—
1975	390	−2.48%
1982	328	−2.44%
1990	325	−0.11%
1999	331	+0.20%
2007	337	+0.22%
2012	352	+0.87%
2017	364	+0.67%
2023	391	+1.20%
Source: INSEE

== See also ==
- Communes of the Puy-de-Dôme department
