= Échandelys =

- Commune
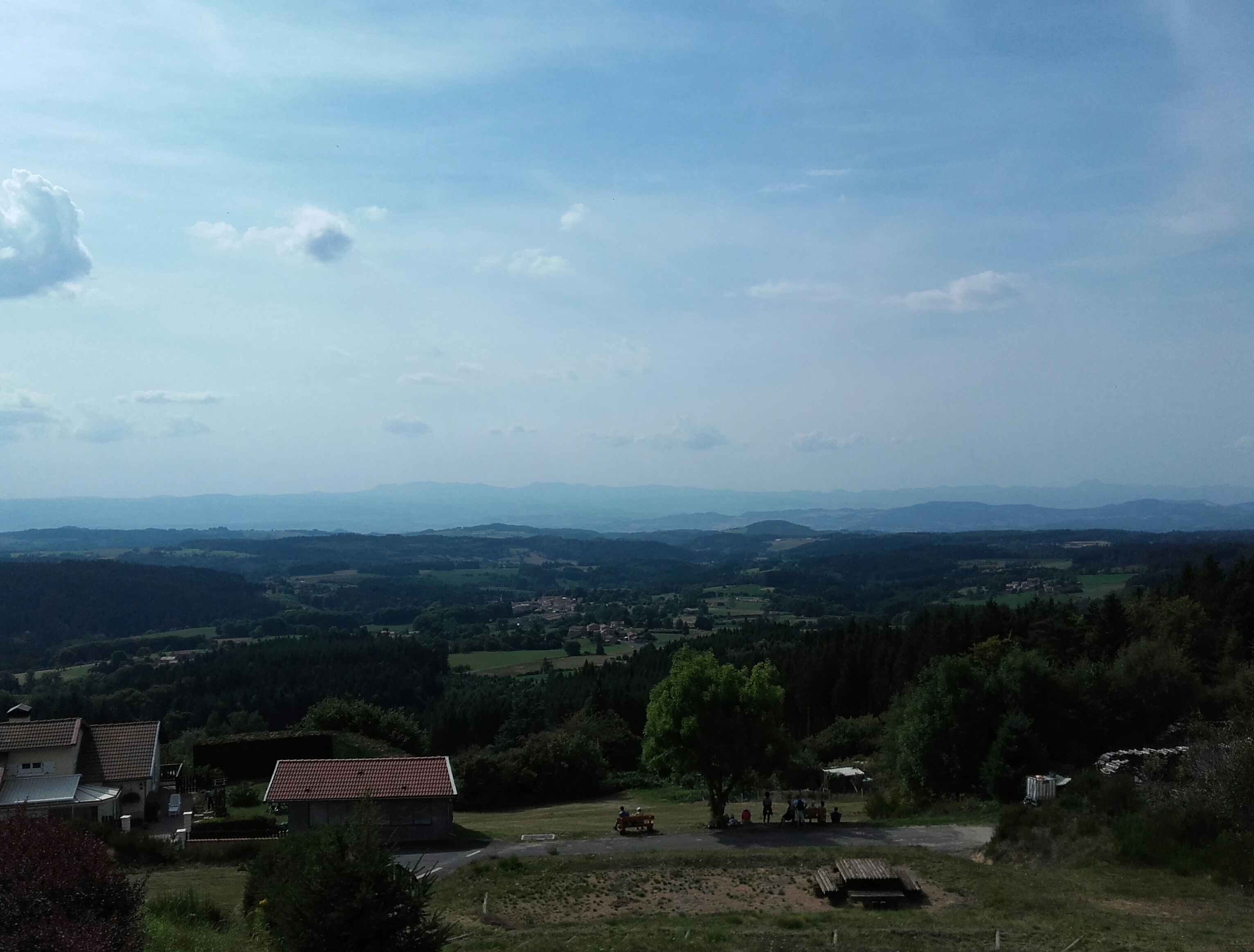
- A general view of Échandelys

- Coat of arms
- Location of Échandelys
- Location within France Location within Auvergne-Rhône-Alpes
- Coordinates: 45°32′40″N 3°31′50″E
- Country: France
- Region: Auvergne-Rhône-Alpes
- Department: Puy-de-Dôme
- Arrondissement: Ambert
- Canton: Les Monts du Livradois
- Intercommunality: Ambert Livradois Forez

Government
  - Mayor (2026–32): Christian Heux
- Area^{1}: 23.59 km^{2} (9.11 sq mi)
- Elevation: 850 m (2,790 ft)
- Highest elevation: 1,108 m (3,635 ft)
- Lowest elevation: 780 m (2,560 ft)
- Population (2023): 248
  - Density: 10.5/km^{2} (27.2/sq mi)
- Time zone: UTC+01:00 (CET)
  - Summer (DST): UTC+02:00 (CEST)
- INSEE/Postal code: 63142 /63980
- ^{1} French Land Register data, which excludes lakes, ponds, glaciers > 1 km^{2} (0.386 sq mi or 247 acres) and river estuaries.

Échandelys (French pronunciation: [eʃɑ̃dli]; Occitan: Eschandalis) is a commune in the Puy-de-Dôme department in Auvergne in central France.

== See also ==
- Communes of the Puy-de-Dôme department
