= Saint-Quentin-sur-Sauxillanges =

- Commune
- Coat of arms
- Location of Saint-Quentin-sur-Sauxillanges
- Location within France Location within Auvergne-Rhône-Alpes
- Coordinates: 45°33′N 3°23′E
- Country: France
- Region: Auvergne-Rhône-Alpes
- Department: Puy-de-Dôme
- Arrondissement: Issoire
- Canton: Brassac-les-Mines
- Intercommunality: Agglo Pays d'Issoire

Government
  - Mayor (2020–2026): Jean-Claude Druelle
- Area^{1}: 8.25 km^{2} (3.19 sq mi)
- Elevation: 600 m (2,000 ft)
- Highest elevation: 795 m (2,608 ft)
- Lowest elevation: 447 m (1,467 ft)
- Population (2023): 109
  - Density: 13.2/km^{2} (34.2/sq mi)
- Time zone: UTC+01:00 (CET)
  - Summer (DST): UTC+02:00 (CEST)
- INSEE/Postal code: 63389 /63490
- ^{1} French Land Register data, which excludes lakes, ponds, glaciers > 1 km^{2} (0.386 sq mi or 247 acres) and river estuaries.

Saint-Quentin-sur-Sauxillanges (French pronunciation: [sɛ̃ kɑ̃tɛ̃ syʁ soksilɑ̃ʒ], literally Saint Quentin on Sauxillanges) is a commune in the Puy-de-Dôme department in Auvergne in central France.

== See also ==
- Communes of the Puy-de-Dôme department
