= Saint-Genès-la-Tourette =

- Commune
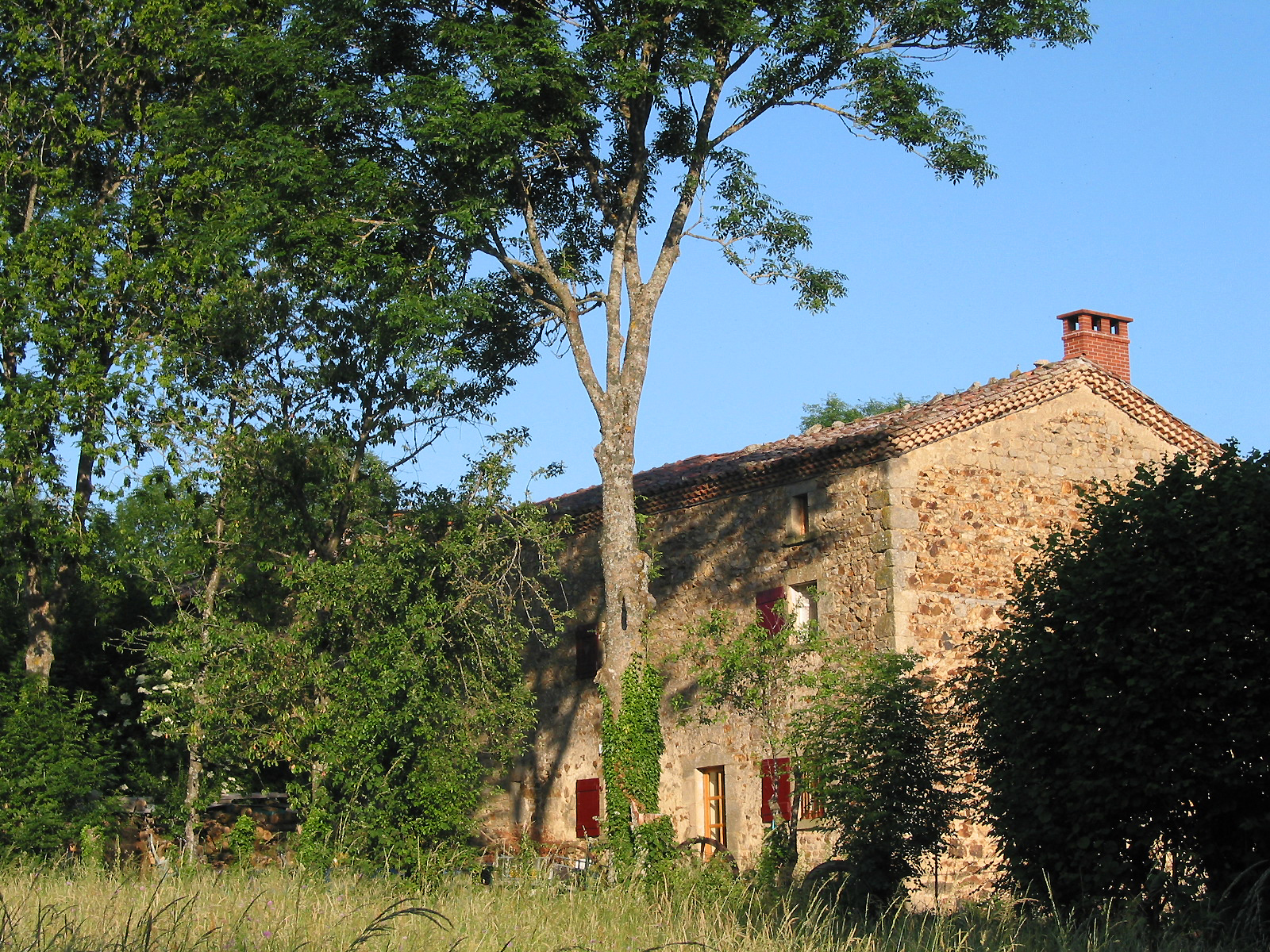
- Ancient farm in the Maredon hamlet

- Coat of arms
- Location of Saint-Genès-la-Tourette
- Location within France Location within Auvergne-Rhône-Alpes
- Coordinates: 45°31′N 3°28′E
- Country: France
- Region: Auvergne-Rhône-Alpes
- Department: Puy-de-Dôme
- Arrondissement: Issoire
- Canton: Brassac-les-Mines
- Intercommunality: Agglo Pays d'Issoire

Government
  - Mayor (2020–2026): Odile Gilbert
- Area^{1}: 18.49 km^{2} (7.14 sq mi)
- Elevation: 790 m (2,590 ft)
- Highest elevation: 1,046 m (3,432 ft)
- Lowest elevation: 639 m (2,096 ft)
- Population (2023): 195
  - Density: 10.5/km^{2} (27.3/sq mi)
- Time zone: UTC+01:00 (CET)
  - Summer (DST): UTC+02:00 (CEST)
- INSEE/Postal code: 63348 /63580
- ^{1} French Land Register data, which excludes lakes, ponds, glaciers > 1 km^{2} (0.386 sq mi or 247 acres) and river estuaries.

Saint-Genès-la-Tourette is a commune in the Puy-de-Dôme department in Auvergne in central France.

== See also ==
- Communes of the Puy-de-Dôme department
