= Peslières =

- Commune
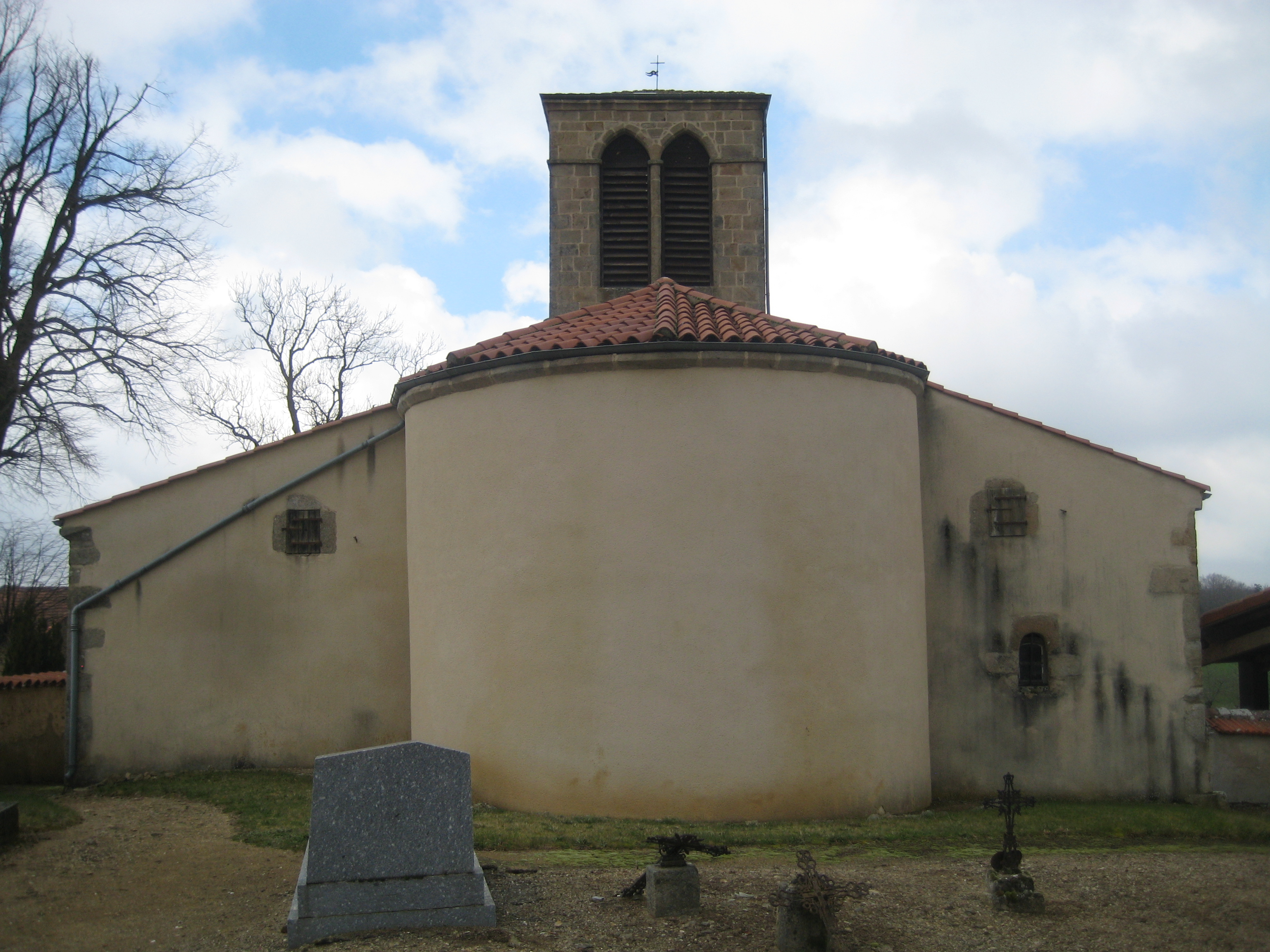
- The church in Peslières
- Location of Peslières
- Location within France Location within Auvergne-Rhône-Alpes
- Coordinates: 45°26′24″N 3°27′40″E
- Country: France
- Region: Auvergne-Rhône-Alpes
- Department: Puy-de-Dôme
- Arrondissement: Issoire
- Canton: Brassac-les-Mines
- Intercommunality: Agglo Pays d'Issoire

Government
  - Mayor (2026–32): David Coston
- Area^{1}: 6.86 km^{2} (2.65 sq mi)
- Elevation: 800 m (2,600 ft)
- Highest elevation: 1,158 m (3,799 ft)
- Lowest elevation: 591 m (1,939 ft)
- Population (2023): 56
  - Density: 8.2/km^{2} (21/sq mi)
- Time zone: UTC+01:00 (CET)
  - Summer (DST): UTC+02:00 (CEST)
- INSEE/Postal code: 63277 /63580
- ^{1} French Land Register data, which excludes lakes, ponds, glaciers > 1 km^{2} (0.386 sq mi or 247 acres) and river estuaries.

Peslières (French pronunciation: [pɛljɛʁ]) is a commune in the Puy-de-Dôme department in Auvergne in central France.

== See also ==
- Communes of the Puy-de-Dôme department
