= Égliseneuve-des-Liards =

- Commune
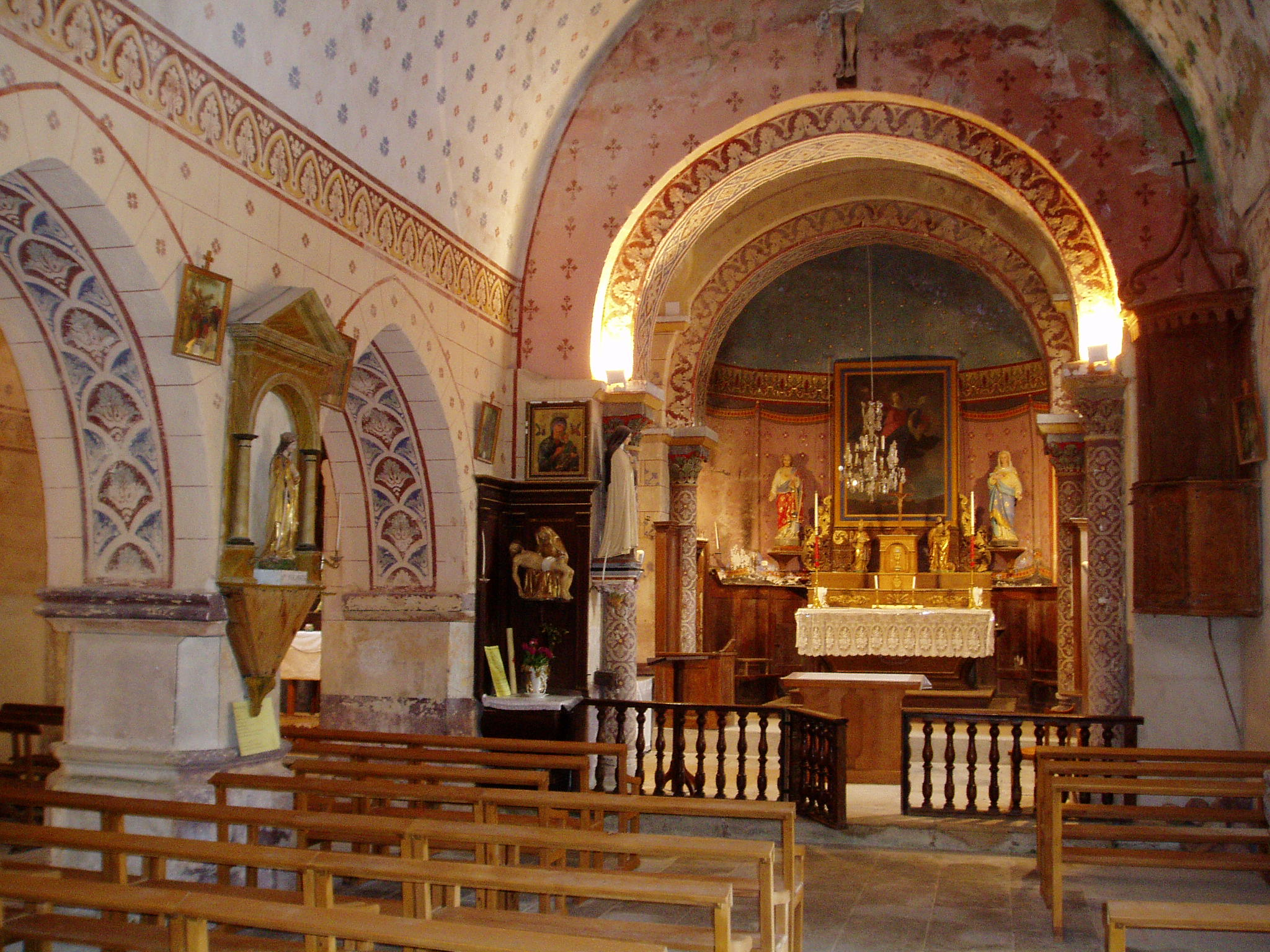
- Interior of Our Lady's Church

- Coat of arms
- Location of Égliseneuve-des-Liards
- Location within France Location within Auvergne-Rhône-Alpes
- Coordinates: 45°34′08″N 3°25′29″E
- Country: France
- Region: Auvergne-Rhône-Alpes
- Department: Puy-de-Dôme
- Arrondissement: Issoire
- Canton: Brassac-les-Mines
- Intercommunality: Agglo Pays d'Issoire

Government
  - Mayor (2026–32): Christophe Vezon
- Area^{1}: 8.35 km^{2} (3.22 sq mi)
- Elevation: 710 m (2,330 ft)
- Highest elevation: 804 m (2,638 ft)
- Lowest elevation: 480 m (1,570 ft)
- Population (2023): 157
  - Density: 18.8/km^{2} (48.7/sq mi)
- Time zone: UTC+01:00 (CET)
  - Summer (DST): UTC+02:00 (CEST)
- INSEE/Postal code: 63145 /63490
- ^{1} French Land Register data, which excludes lakes, ponds, glaciers > 1 km^{2} (0.386 sq mi or 247 acres) and river estuaries.

Égliseneuve-des-Liards (French pronunciation: [eɡliznœv de ljaʁ]) is a commune in the Puy-de-Dôme department in Auvergne in central France.

== See also ==
- Communes of the Puy-de-Dôme department
