= Rentières =

Rentiè
- Commune
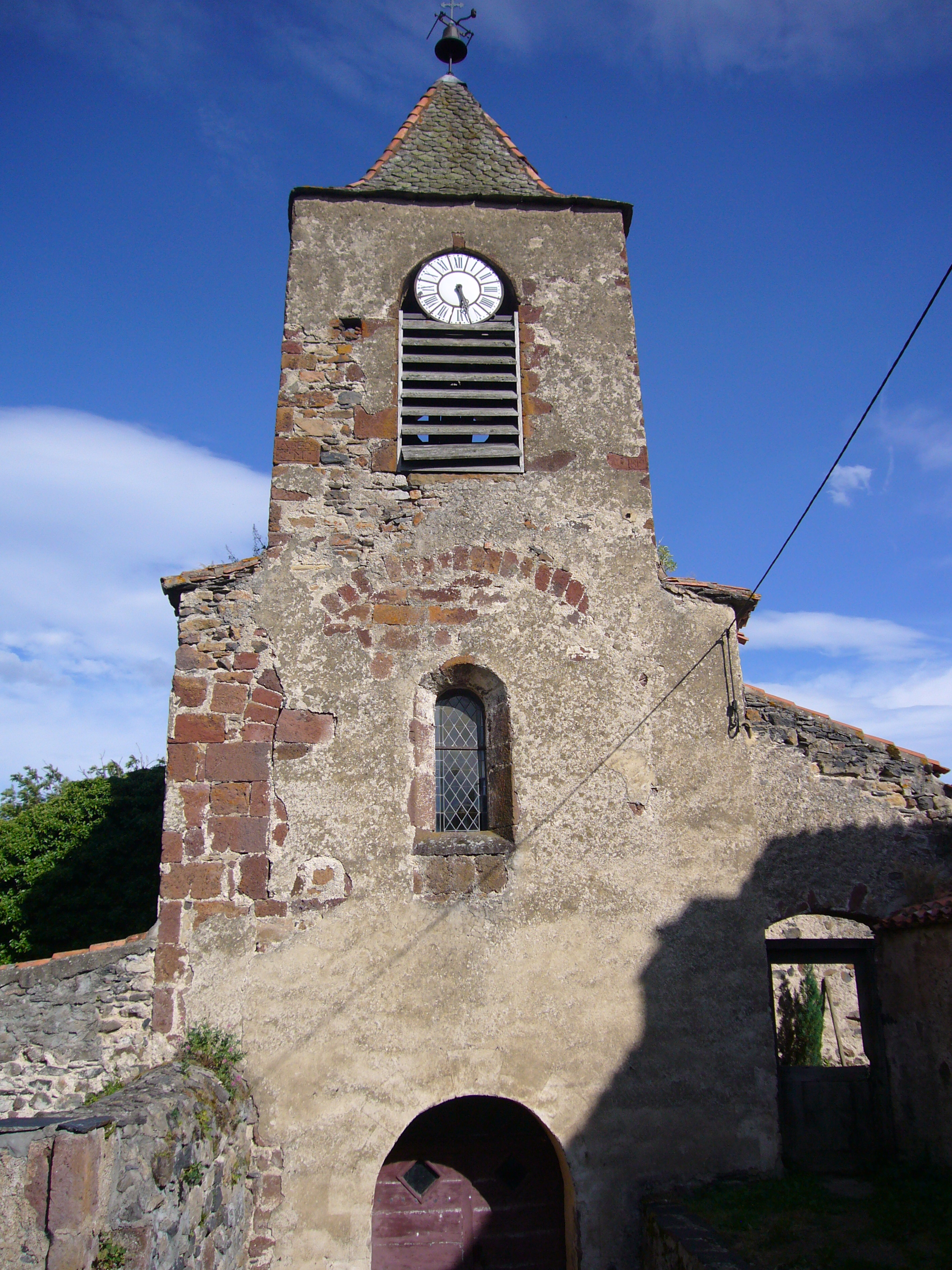
- The church in Rentières
- Location of Rentiè
- Location within France Location within Auvergne-Rhône-Alpes
- Coordinates: 45°25′01″N 3°05′56″E
- Country: France
- Region: Auvergne-Rhône-Alpes
- Department: Puy-de-Dôme
- Arrondissement: Issoire
- Canton: Brassac-les-Mines
- Intercommunality: Agglo Pays d'Issoire

Government
  - Mayor (2020–2026): Jean-Louis Lenègre
- Area^{1}: 15.59 km^{2} (6.02 sq mi)
- Elevation: 740 m (2,430 ft)
- Highest elevation: 1,095 m (3,593 ft)
- Lowest elevation: 520 m (1,710 ft)
- Population (2023): 106
  - Density: 6.80/km^{2} (17.6/sq mi)
- Time zone: UTC+01:00 (CET)
  - Summer (DST): UTC+02:00 (CEST)
- INSEE/Postal code: 63299 /63420
- ^{1} French Land Register data, which excludes lakes, ponds, glaciers > 1 km^{2} (0.386 sq mi or 247 acres) and river estuaries.

Rentières (French pronunciation: [ʁɑ̃tjɛʁ]) is a commune in the Puy-de-Dôme department in Auvergne in central France.

== See also ==
- Communes of the Puy-de-Dôme department
