= Valz-sous-Châteauneuf =

- Commune
- Location of Valz-sous-Châteauneuf
- Location within France Location within Auvergne-Rhône-Alpes
- Coordinates: 45°26′02″N 3°25′01″E
- Country: France
- Region: Auvergne-Rhône-Alpes
- Department: Puy-de-Dôme
- Arrondissement: Issoire
- Canton: Brassac-les-Mines
- Intercommunality: Agglo Pays d'Issoire

Government
  - Mayor (2026–32): Christine Decourteix
- Area^{1}: 5.14 km^{2} (1.98 sq mi)
- Elevation: 543 m (1,781 ft)
- Highest elevation: 791 m (2,595 ft)
- Lowest elevation: 509 m (1,670 ft)
- Population (2023): 52
  - Density: 10/km^{2} (26/sq mi)
- Time zone: UTC+01:00 (CET)
  - Summer (DST): UTC+02:00 (CEST)
- INSEE/Postal code: 63442 /63580
- ^{1} French Land Register data, which excludes lakes, ponds, glaciers > 1 km^{2} (0.386 sq mi or 247 acres) and river estuaries.

Valz-sous-Châteauneuf is a commune in the Puy-de-Dôme department in Auvergne in central France.

== See also ==
- Communes of the Puy-de-Dôme department
