= Bansat =

- Commune
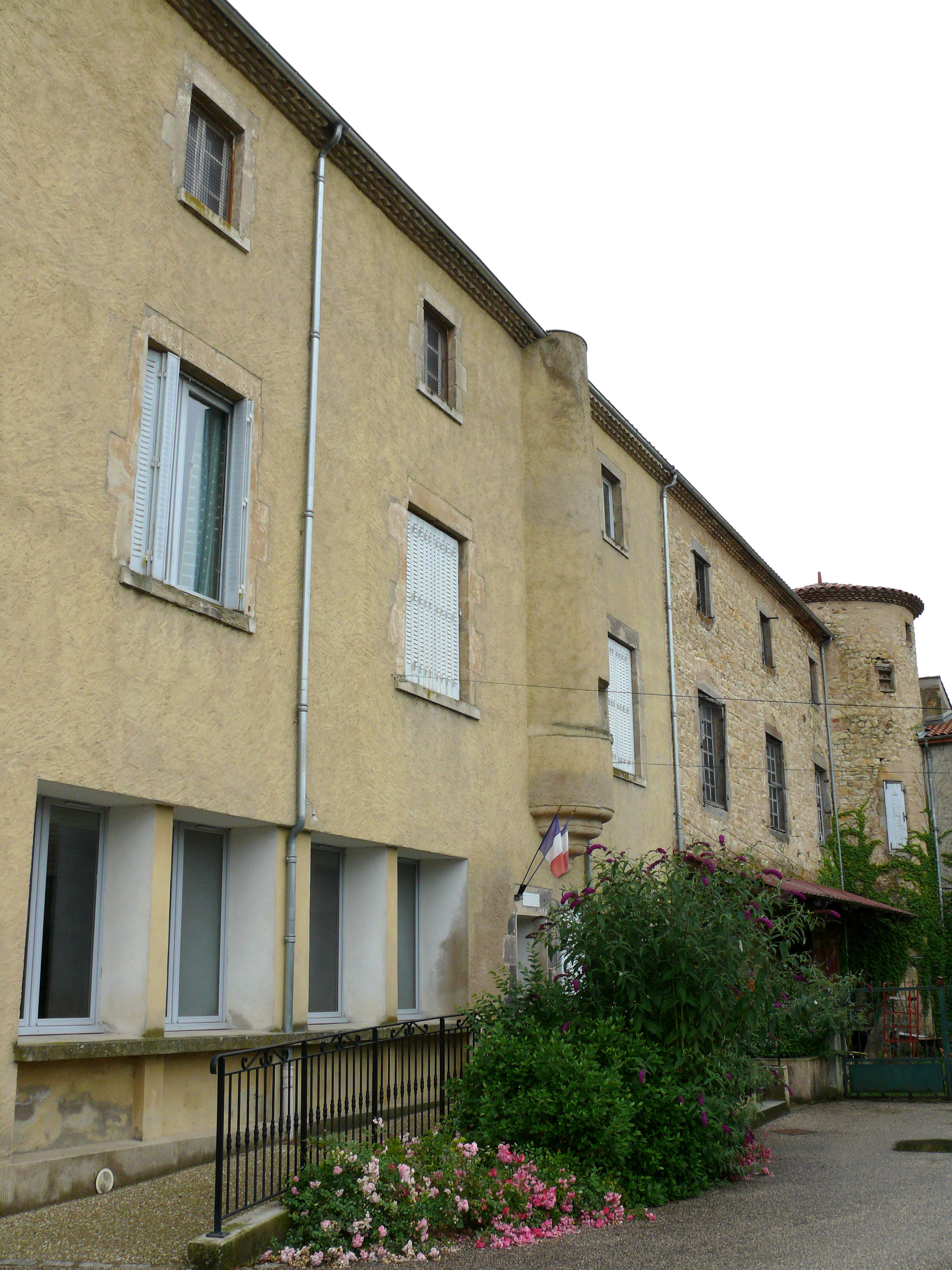
- The town hall in Bansat
- Location of Bansat
- Location within France Location within Auvergne-Rhône-Alpes
- Coordinates: 45°29′06″N 3°20′41″E
- Country: France
- Region: Auvergne-Rhône-Alpes
- Department: Puy-de-Dôme
- Arrondissement: Issoire
- Canton: Brassac-les-Mines
- Intercommunality: Agglo Pays d'Issoire

Government
  - Mayor (2026–32): Annie Maloron
- Area^{1}: 10.31 km^{2} (3.98 sq mi)
- Elevation: 449 m (1,473 ft)
- Highest elevation: 731 m (2,398 ft)
- Lowest elevation: 424 m (1,391 ft)
- Population (2023): 264
  - Density: 25.6/km^{2} (66.3/sq mi)
- Time zone: UTC+01:00 (CET)
  - Summer (DST): UTC+02:00 (CEST)
- INSEE/Postal code: 63029 /63570
- ^{1} French Land Register data, which excludes lakes, ponds, glaciers > 1 km^{2} (0.386 sq mi or 247 acres) and river estuaries.

Bansat (French pronunciation: [bɑ̃sa]) is a commune in the Puy-de-Dôme department in Auvergne-Rhône-Alpes in central France. It is in the canton of Brassac-les-Mines.

== Population ==
Historical population
Year	Pop.	±% p.a.
1968	240	—
1975	211	−1.82%
1982	184	−1.94%
1990	220	+2.26%
1999	203	−0.89%
2007	243	+2.27%
2012	250	+0.57%
2017	253	+0.24%
2023	264	+0.71%
Source: INSEE

== See also ==
- Communes of the Puy-de-Dôme department
