= Collanges =

- Commune
- Coat of arms
- Location of Collanges
- Location within France Location within Auvergne-Rhône-Alpes
- Coordinates: 45°26′18″N 3°13′07″E
- Country: France
- Region: Auvergne-Rhône-Alpes
- Department: Puy-de-Dôme
- Arrondissement: Issoire
- Canton: Brassac-les-Mines
- Intercommunality: Agglo Pays d'Issoire

Government
  - Mayor (2026–32): Nathalie Zanin
- Area^{1}: 4.45 km^{2} (1.72 sq mi)
- Elevation: 450 m (1,480 ft)
- Highest elevation: 651 m (2,136 ft)
- Lowest elevation: 437 m (1,434 ft)
- Population (2023): 157
  - Density: 35.3/km^{2} (91.4/sq mi)
- Time zone: UTC+01:00 (CET)
  - Summer (DST): UTC+02:00 (CEST)
- INSEE/Postal code: 63114 /63340
- ^{1} French Land Register data, which excludes lakes, ponds, glaciers > 1 km^{2} (0.386 sq mi or 247 acres) and river estuaries.

Collanges (French pronunciation: [kɔlɑ̃ʒ]; Occitan: Colanjas) is a commune in the Puy-de-Dôme department in Auvergne-Rhône-Alpes in central France. It is in the canton of Brassac-les-Mines.

== History ==
The historical development of the site and the region from medieval times were directly linked to the evolution of the families of the Lords of Collanges and the establishment of the Château de Collanges (castle of Collanges). Therefore, since the occupations of WW2, the village and territory went under reconstruction until current days. Today, Collanges presents modern transportation and communication while preserving its heritage of a historical site of France in the European Community.

== See also ==
- Communes of the Puy-de-Dôme department
