= Champagnat-le-Jeune =

- Commune
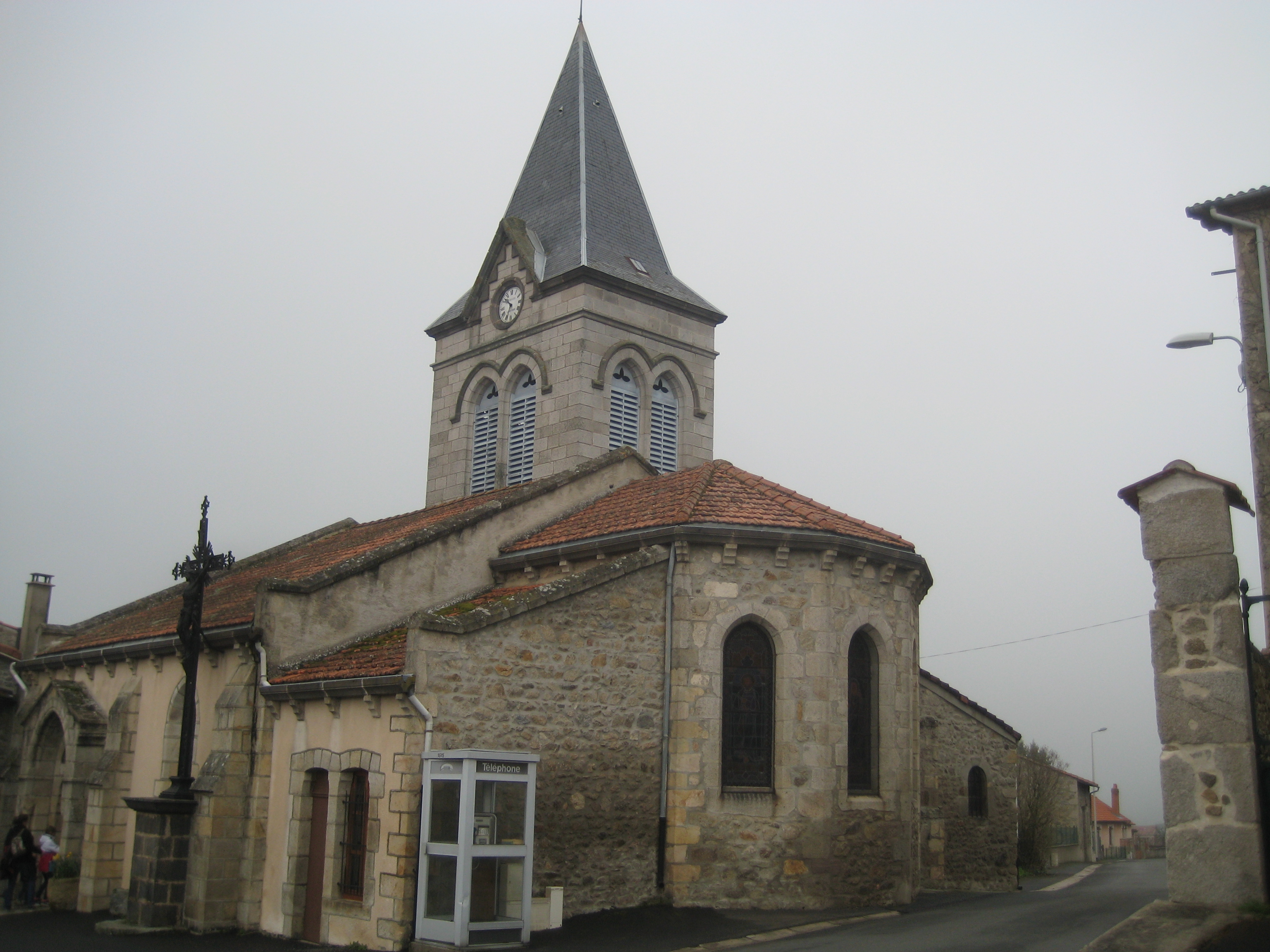
- The church in Champagnat-le-Jeune
- Location of Champagnat-le-Jeune
- Location within France Location within Auvergne-Rhône-Alpes
- Coordinates: 45°27′02″N 3°25′38″E
- Country: France
- Region: Auvergne-Rhône-Alpes
- Department: Puy-de-Dôme
- Arrondissement: Issoire
- Canton: Brassac-les-Mines
- Intercommunality: Agglo Pays d'Issoire

Government
  - Mayor (2026–32): André Bardy
- Area^{1}: 9.39 km^{2} (3.63 sq mi)
- Elevation: 670 m (2,200 ft)
- Highest elevation: 868 m (2,848 ft)
- Lowest elevation: 505 m (1,657 ft)
- Population (2023): 149
  - Density: 15.9/km^{2} (41.1/sq mi)
- Time zone: UTC+01:00 (CET)
  - Summer (DST): UTC+02:00 (CEST)
- INSEE/Postal code: 63079 /63580
- ^{1} French Land Register data, which excludes lakes, ponds, glaciers > 1 km^{2} (0.386 sq mi or 247 acres) and river estuaries.

Champagnat-le-Jeune (French pronunciation: [ʃɑ̃paɲa lə ʒœn]; Occitan: Champanhat lo Jove) is a commune in the Puy-de-Dôme department in Auvergne-Rhône-Alpes in central France. It is in the canton of Brassac-les-Mines.

== See also ==
- Communes of the Puy-de-Dôme department
