= Saint-Jean-en-Val =

- Commune
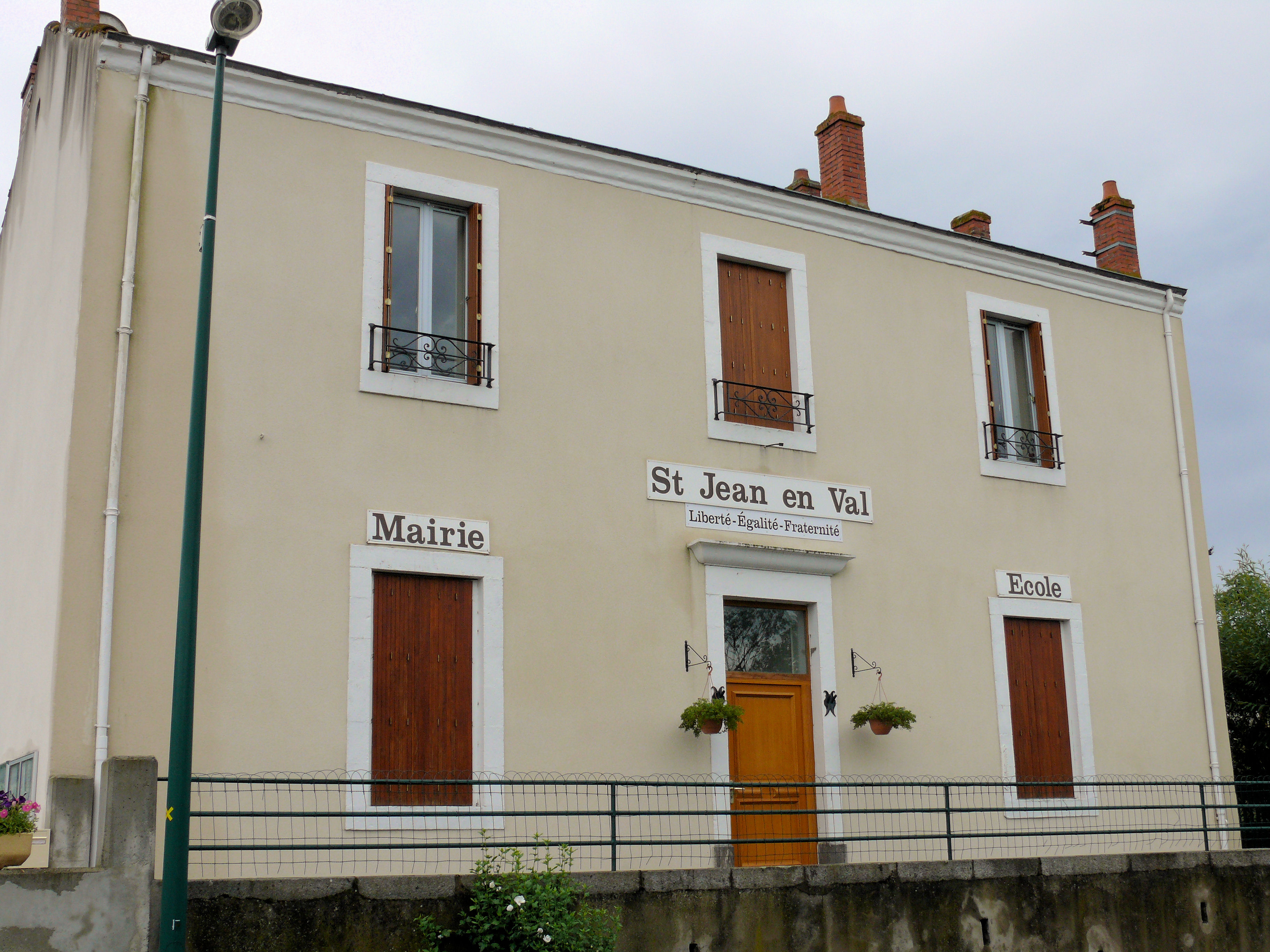
- The town hall in Saint-Jean-en-Val
- Location of Saint-Jean-en-Val
- Location within France Location within Auvergne-Rhône-Alpes
- Coordinates: 45°31′23″N 3°21′22″E
- Country: France
- Region: Auvergne-Rhône-Alpes
- Department: Puy-de-Dôme
- Arrondissement: Issoire
- Canton: Brassac-les-Mines
- Intercommunality: Agglo Pays d'Issoire

Government
  - Mayor (2020–2026): Gérard Bastien
- Area^{1}: 12.09 km^{2} (4.67 sq mi)
- Elevation: 430 m (1,410 ft)
- Highest elevation: 663 m (2,175 ft)
- Lowest elevation: 399 m (1,309 ft)
- Population (2023): 356
  - Density: 29.4/km^{2} (76.3/sq mi)
- Time zone: UTC+01:00 (CET)
  - Summer (DST): UTC+02:00 (CEST)
- INSEE/Postal code: 63366 /63490
- ^{1} French Land Register data, which excludes lakes, ponds, glaciers > 1 km^{2} (0.386 sq mi or 247 acres) and river estuaries.

Saint-Jean-en-Val (French pronunciation: [sɛ̃ ʒɑ̃ ɑ̃ val]) is a commune in the Puy-de-Dôme department in Auvergne in central France.

== See also ==
- Communes of the Puy-de-Dôme department
