= Chalus, Puy-de-Dôme =

Chalus
- Commune
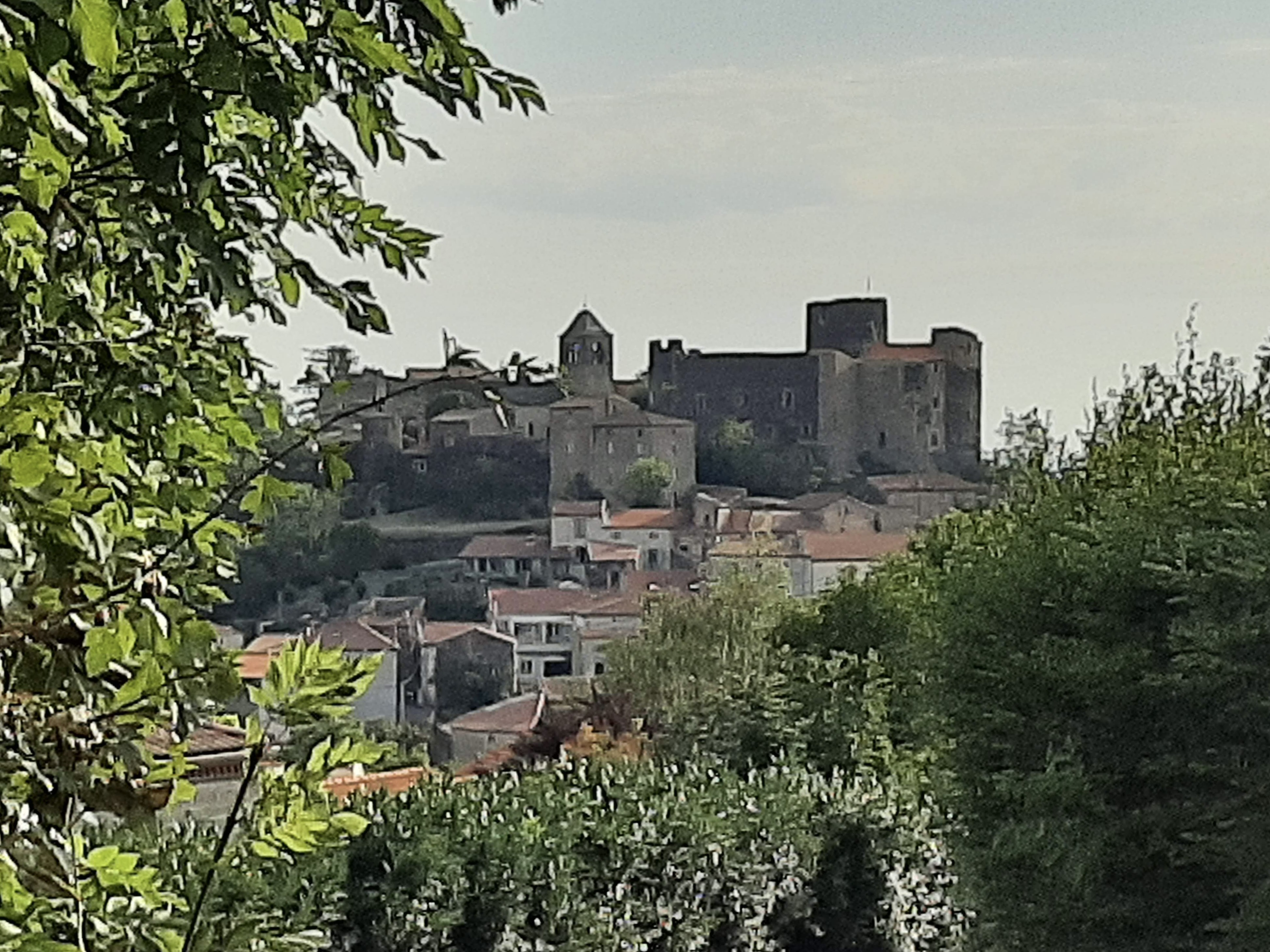
- Château of Chalus and Church of Sainte-Foy

- Coat of arms
- Location of Chalus
- Location within France Location within Auvergne-Rhône-Alpes
- Coordinates: 45°27′58″N 3°12′32″E
- Country: France
- Region: Auvergne-Rhône-Alpes
- Department: Puy-de-Dôme
- Arrondissement: Issoire
- Canton: Brassac-les-Mines
- Intercommunality: Agglo Pays d'Issoire

Government
  - Mayor (2026–32): Frédéric Ligniere
- Area^{1}: 6.58 km^{2} (2.54 sq mi)
- Elevation: 530 m (1,740 ft)
- Highest elevation: 647 m (2,123 ft)
- Lowest elevation: 417 m (1,368 ft)
- Population (2023): 177
  - Density: 26.9/km^{2} (69.7/sq mi)
- Time zone: UTC+01:00 (CET)
  - Summer (DST): UTC+02:00 (CEST)
- INSEE/Postal code: 63074 /63340
- ^{1} French Land Register data, which excludes lakes, ponds, glaciers > 1 km^{2} (0.386 sq mi or 247 acres) and river estuaries.

Chalus (Occitan: Chasluç) is a commune in the Puy-de-Dôme department in Auvergne in central France.

== See also ==
- Communes of the Puy-de-Dôme department
