= Apchat =

- Commune
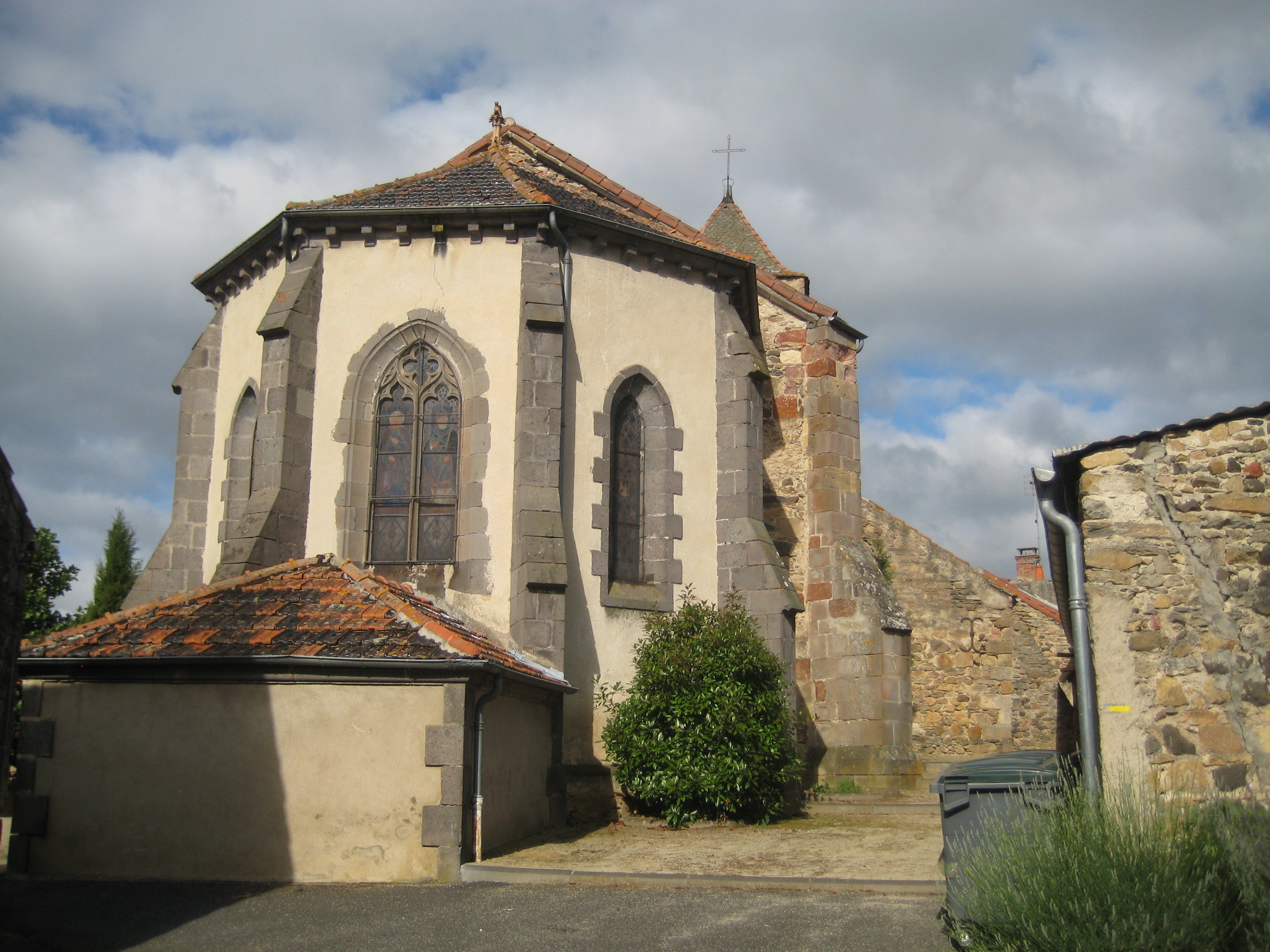
- The church in Apchat

- Coat of arms
- Location of Apchat
- Location within France Location within Auvergne-Rhône-Alpes
- Coordinates: 45°23′25″N 3°08′48″E
- Country: France
- Region: Auvergne-Rhône-Alpes
- Department: Puy-de-Dôme
- Arrondissement: Issoire
- Canton: Brassac-les-Mines
- Intercommunality: Agglo Pays d'Issoire

Government
  - Mayor (2026–32): Patrick Pélissier
- Area^{1}: 35.86 km^{2} (13.85 sq mi)
- Elevation: 705 m (2,313 ft)
- Highest elevation: 989 m (3,245 ft)
- Lowest elevation: 477 m (1,565 ft)
- Population (2023): 162
  - Density: 4.52/km^{2} (11.7/sq mi)
- Time zone: UTC+01:00 (CET)
  - Summer (DST): UTC+02:00 (CEST)
- INSEE/Postal code: 63007 /63420
- ^{1} French Land Register data, which excludes lakes, ponds, glaciers > 1 km^{2} (0.386 sq mi or 247 acres) and river estuaries.

Apchat is a commune in the Puy-de-Dôme department in Auvergne-Rhône-Alpes in central France. It is in the canton of Brassac-les-Mines.

== Population ==
Historical population
Year	Pop.	±% p.a.
1968	263	—
1975	231	−1.84%
1982	242	+0.67%
1990	218	−1.30%
1999	207	−0.57%
2007	194	−0.81%
2012	176	−1.93%
2017	166	−1.16%
2023	162	−0.41%
Source: INSEE

== See also ==
- Communes of the Puy-de-Dôme department
