= Saint-Hérent =

- Commune
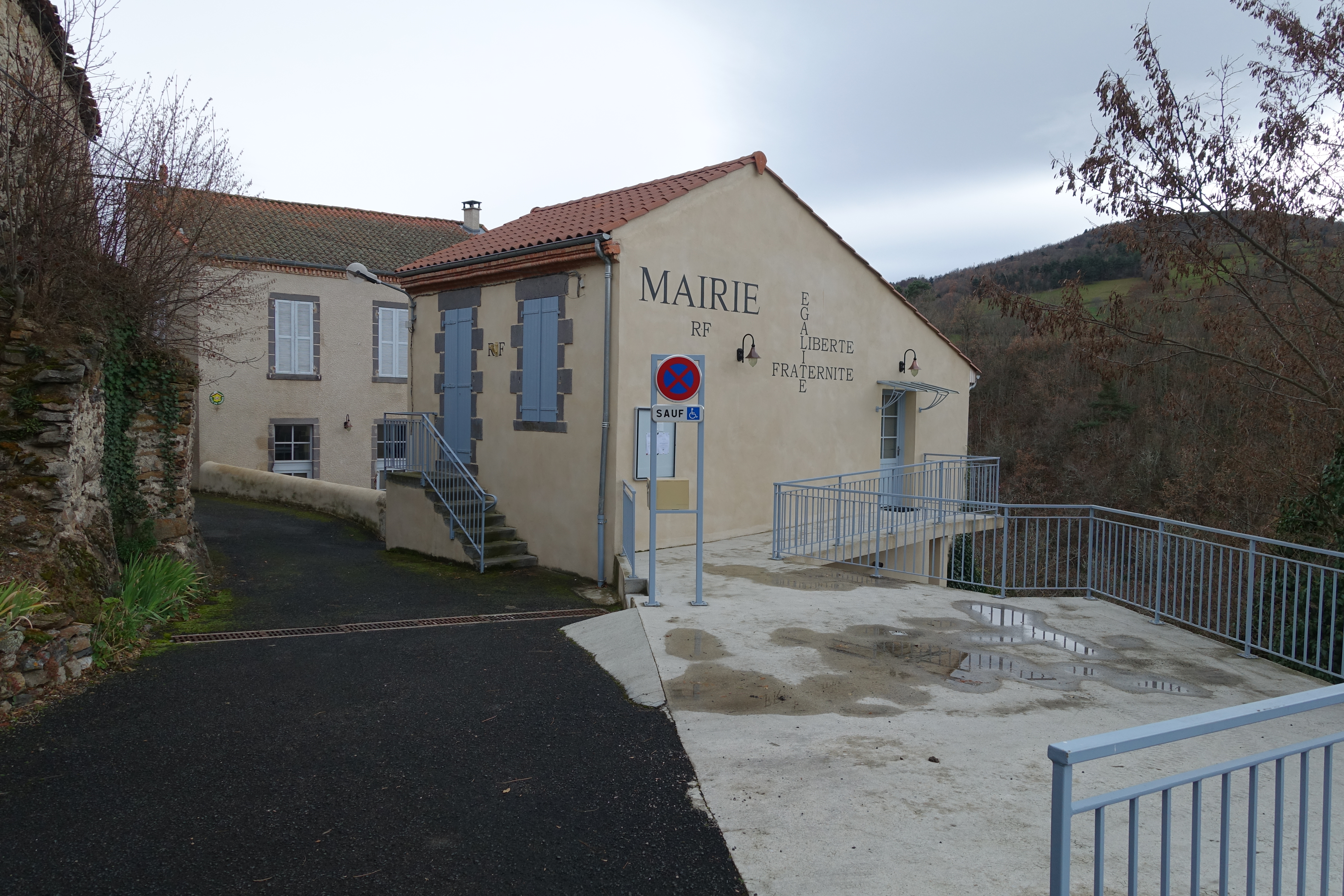
- The town hall in Saint-Hérent
- Location of Saint-Hérent
- Location within France Location within Auvergne-Rhône-Alpes
- Coordinates: 45°27′32″N 3°09′04″E
- Country: France
- Region: Auvergne-Rhône-Alpes
- Department: Puy-de-Dôme
- Arrondissement: Issoire
- Canton: Brassac-les-Mines
- Intercommunality: Agglo Pays d'Issoire

Government
  - Mayor (2026–32): Nathalie Ferraris
- Area^{1}: 12.79 km^{2} (4.94 sq mi)
- Elevation: 600 m (2,000 ft)
- Highest elevation: 945 m (3,100 ft)
- Lowest elevation: 480 m (1,570 ft)
- Population (2023): 111
  - Density: 8.68/km^{2} (22.5/sq mi)
- Time zone: UTC+01:00 (CET)
  - Summer (DST): UTC+02:00 (CEST)
- INSEE/Postal code: 63357 /63340
- ^{1} French Land Register data, which excludes lakes, ponds, glaciers > 1 km^{2} (0.386 sq mi or 247 acres) and river estuaries.

Saint-Hérent (French pronunciation: [sɛ̃t‿eʁɑ̃]; Occitan: Sent Eren) is a commune in the Puy-de-Dôme department in Auvergne in central France.

== See also ==
- Communes of the Puy-de-Dôme department
