= Saint-Gervazy =

- Commune
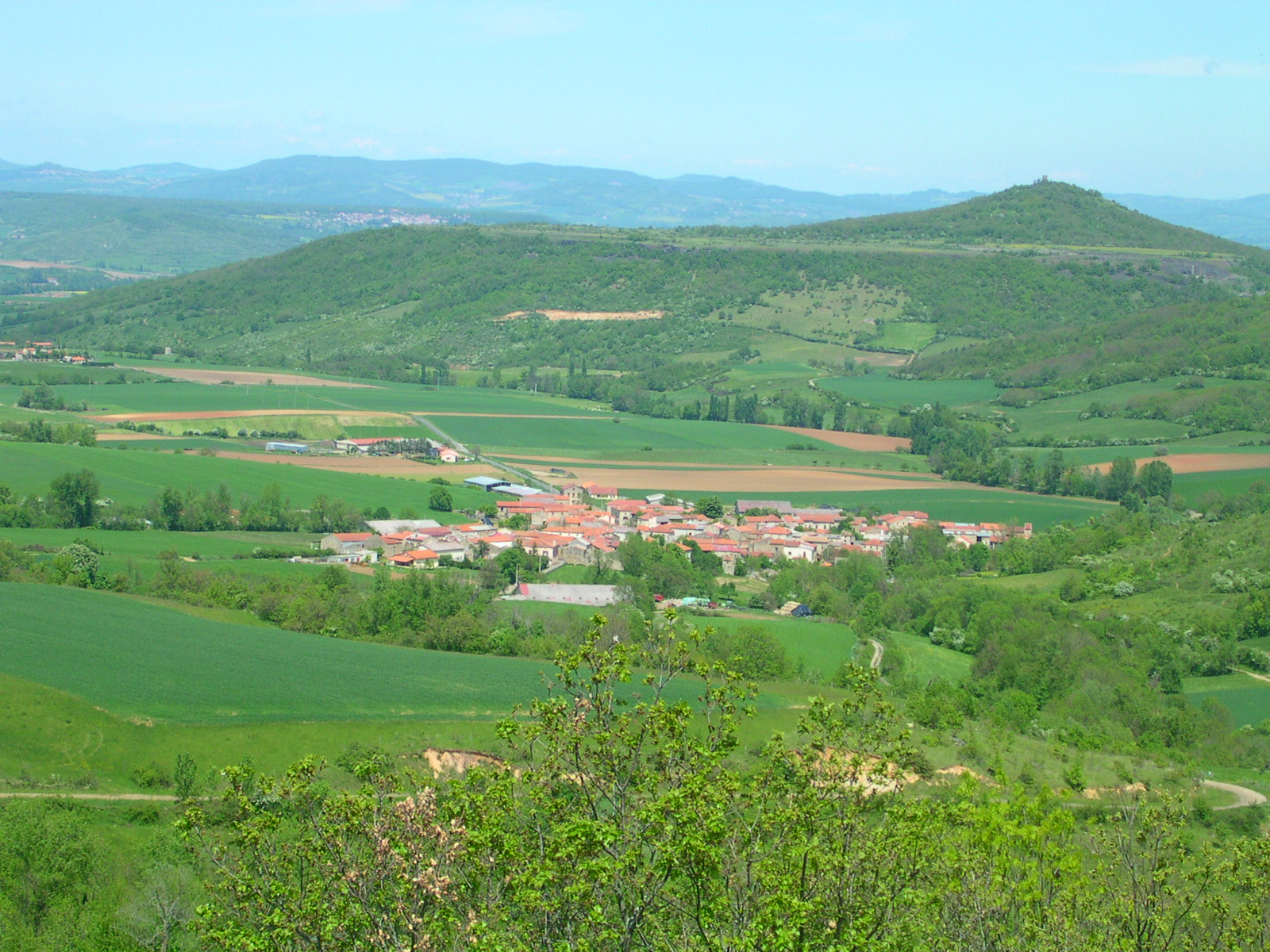
- A general view of Segonzat
- Location of Saint-Gervazy
- Location within France Location within Auvergne-Rhône-Alpes
- Coordinates: 45°24′54″N 3°12′58″E
- Country: France
- Region: Auvergne-Rhône-Alpes
- Department: Puy-de-Dôme
- Arrondissement: Issoire
- Canton: Brassac-les-Mines
- Intercommunality: Agglo Pays d'Issoire

Government
  - Mayor (2020–2026): Serge Barthomeuf
- Area^{1}: 14.23 km^{2} (5.49 sq mi)
- Elevation: 500 m (1,600 ft)
- Highest elevation: 790 m (2,590 ft)
- Lowest elevation: 458 m (1,503 ft)
- Population (2023): 340
  - Density: 24/km^{2} (62/sq mi)
- Time zone: UTC+01:00 (CET)
  - Summer (DST): UTC+02:00 (CEST)
- INSEE/Postal code: 63356 /63340
- ^{1} French Land Register data, which excludes lakes, ponds, glaciers > 1 km^{2} (0.386 sq mi or 247 acres) and river estuaries.

Saint-Gervazy (French pronunciation: [sɛ̃ ʒɛʁvazi]; Occitan: Sant Gervasi) is a commune in the Puy-de-Dôme department in Auvergne in central France.

== See also ==
- Communes of the Puy-de-Dôme department
