= Augnat =

- Commune
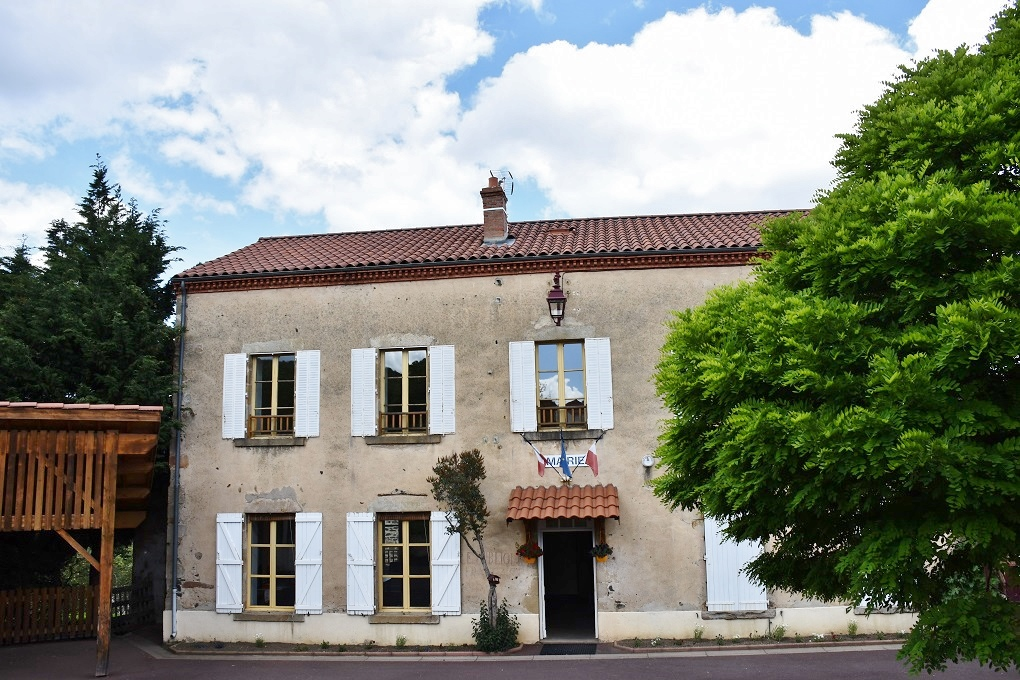
- Town hall
- Location of Augnat
- Location within France Location within Auvergne-Rhône-Alpes
- Coordinates: 45°24′45″N 3°10′58″E
- Country: France
- Region: Auvergne-Rhône-Alpes
- Department: Puy-de-Dôme
- Arrondissement: Issoire
- Canton: Brassac-les-Mines
- Intercommunality: Agglo Pays d'Issoire

Government
  - Mayor (2026–32): Pascale Brun
- Area^{1}: 9.54 km^{2} (3.68 sq mi)
- Elevation: 610 m (2,000 ft)
- Highest elevation: 822 m (2,697 ft)
- Lowest elevation: 469 m (1,539 ft)
- Population (2023): 183
  - Density: 19.2/km^{2} (49.7/sq mi)
- Time zone: UTC+01:00 (CET)
  - Summer (DST): UTC+02:00 (CEST)
- INSEE/Postal code: 63017 /63340
- ^{1} French Land Register data, which excludes lakes, ponds, glaciers > 1 km^{2} (0.386 sq mi or 247 acres) and river estuaries.

Augnat (French pronunciation: [oɲa]) is a commune in the Puy-de-Dôme department in Auvergne-Rhône-Alpes in central France. It is in the canton of Brassac-les-Mines.

== Population ==
Historical population

Year	Pop.	±% p.a.
1876	356	—
1962	157	−0.95%
1968	130	−3.10%
1975	135	+0.54%
1982	111	−2.76%
1990	111	+0.00%

Year	Pop.	±% p.a.
1999	133	+2.03%
2007	143	+0.91%
2012	138	−0.71%
2017	172	+4.50%
2023	183	+1.04%

Source: EHESS and INSEE

== See also ==
- Communes of the Puy-de-Dôme department
