= Saint-Jean-Saint-Gervais =

- Commune
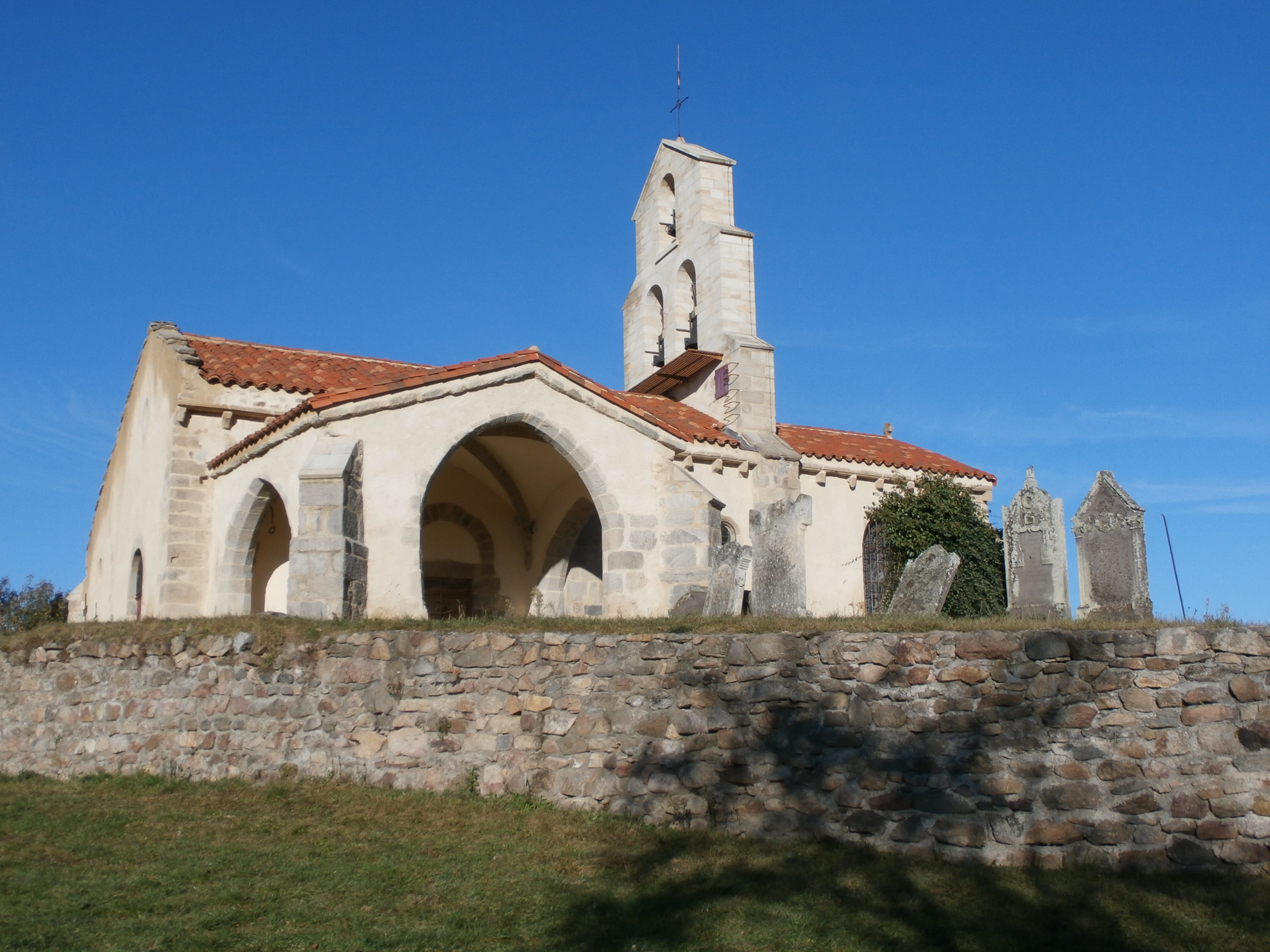
- The church in Saint-Jean-Saint-Gervais
- Location of Saint-Jean-Saint-Gervais
- Location within France Location within Auvergne-Rhône-Alpes
- Coordinates: 45°24′54″N 3°22′34″E
- Country: France
- Region: Auvergne-Rhône-Alpes
- Department: Puy-de-Dôme
- Arrondissement: Issoire
- Canton: Brassac-les-Mines
- Intercommunality: Agglo Pays d'Issoire

Government
  - Mayor (2021–2026): Philippe Boistard
- Area^{1}: 14.39 km^{2} (5.56 sq mi)
- Highest elevation: 767 m (2,516 ft)
- Lowest elevation: 455 m (1,493 ft)
- Population (2023): 126
  - Density: 8.76/km^{2} (22.7/sq mi)
- Time zone: UTC+01:00 (CET)
  - Summer (DST): UTC+02:00 (CEST)
- INSEE/Postal code: 63367 /63570
- ^{1} French Land Register data, which excludes lakes, ponds, glaciers > 1 km^{2} (0.386 sq mi or 247 acres) and river estuaries.

Saint-Jean-Saint-Gervais (French pronunciation: [sɛ̃ ʒɑ̃ sɛ̃ ʒɛʁvɛ]) is a commune in the Puy-de-Dôme department in Auvergne in central France.

== See also ==
- Communes of the Puy-de-Dôme department
