= Saint-Rémy-de-Chargnat =

- Commune
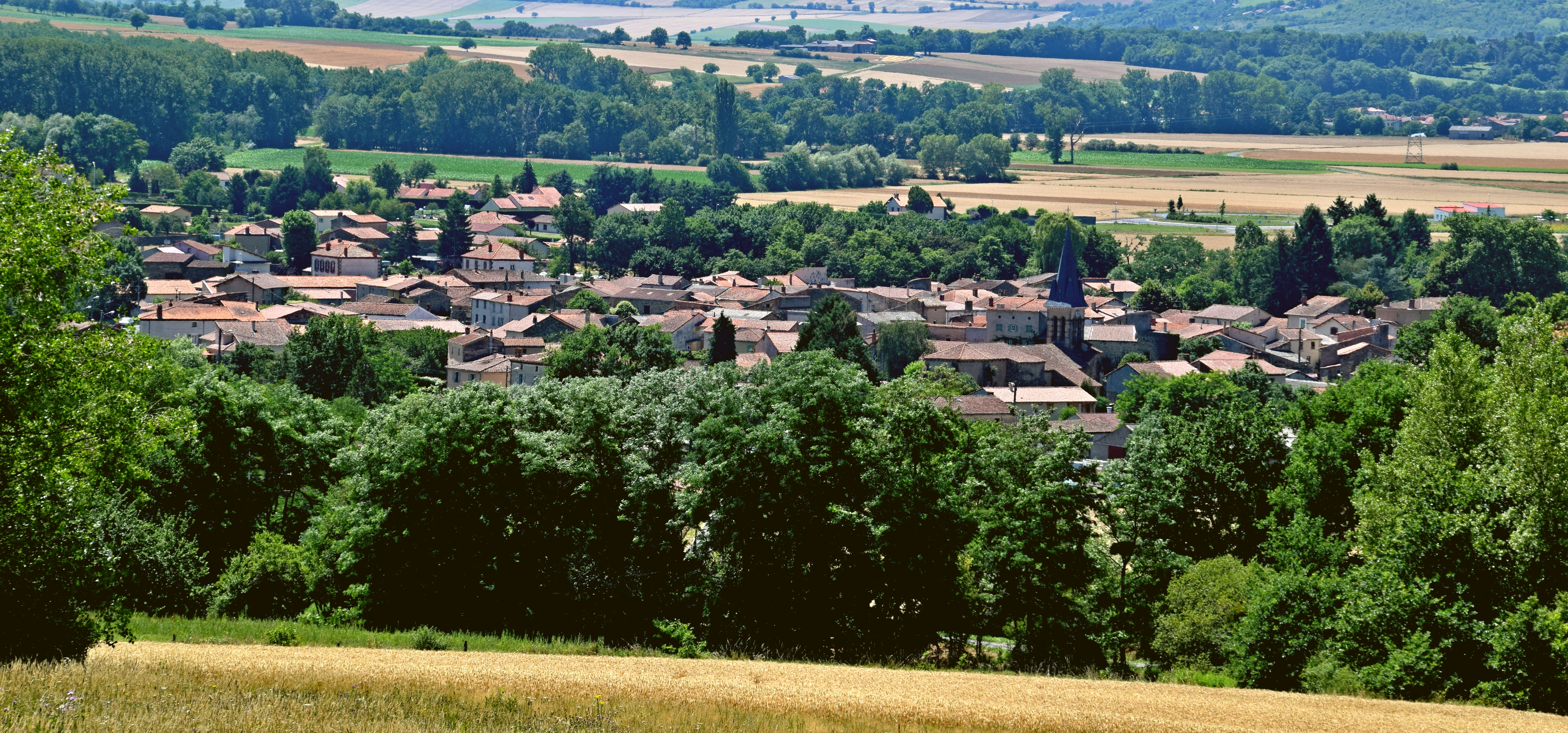
- A general view of Saint-Rémy-de-Chargnat
- Location of Saint-Rémy-de-Chargnat
- Location within France Location within Auvergne-Rhône-Alpes
- Coordinates: 45°30′58″N 3°19′26″E
- Country: France
- Region: Auvergne-Rhône-Alpes
- Department: Puy-de-Dôme
- Arrondissement: Issoire
- Canton: Brassac-les-Mines
- Intercommunality: Agglo Pays d'Issoire

Government
  - Mayor (2020–2026): José Fanjul
- Area^{1}: 6.21 km^{2} (2.40 sq mi)
- Elevation: 400 m (1,300 ft)
- Highest elevation: 479 m (1,572 ft)
- Lowest elevation: 378 m (1,240 ft)
- Population (2023): 631
  - Density: 102/km^{2} (263/sq mi)
- Time zone: UTC+01:00 (CET)
  - Summer (DST): UTC+02:00 (CEST)
- INSEE/Postal code: 63392 /63500
- ^{1} French Land Register data, which excludes lakes, ponds, glaciers > 1 km^{2} (0.386 sq mi or 247 acres) and river estuaries.

Saint-Rémy-de-Chargnat (French pronunciation: [sɛ̃ ʁemi də ʃaʁɲa]; Auvergnat: Sent Remesi de Charnhac) is a commune in the Puy-de-Dôme department in Auvergne in central France.

== See also ==
- Communes of the Puy-de-Dôme department
