= Mareugheol =

- Commune
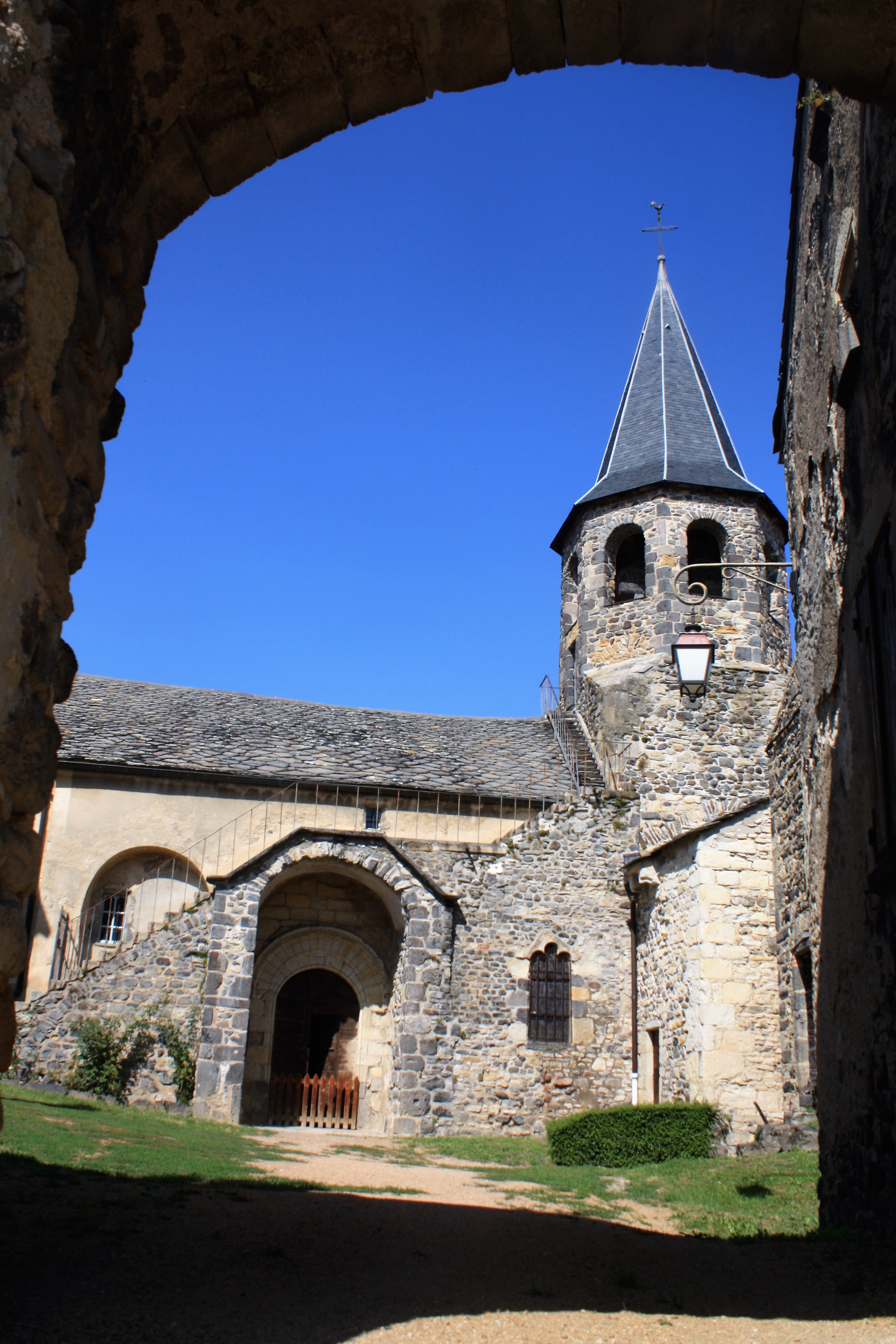
- The church in Mareugheol

- Coat of arms
- Location of Mareugheol
- Location within France Location within Auvergne-Rhône-Alpes
- Coordinates: 45°29′20″N 3°09′58″E
- Country: France
- Region: Auvergne-Rhône-Alpes
- Department: Puy-de-Dôme
- Arrondissement: Issoire
- Canton: Brassac-les-Mines
- Intercommunality: Agglo Pays d'Issoire

Government
  - Mayor (2020–2026): Christophe Pellegrinelli
- Area^{1}: 7.54 km^{2} (2.91 sq mi)
- Elevation: 525 m (1,722 ft)
- Highest elevation: 762 m (2,500 ft)
- Lowest elevation: 436 m (1,430 ft)
- Population (2023): 215
  - Density: 28.5/km^{2} (73.9/sq mi)
- Time zone: UTC+01:00 (CET)
  - Summer (DST): UTC+02:00 (CEST)
- INSEE/Postal code: 63209 /63340
- ^{1} French Land Register data, which excludes lakes, ponds, glaciers > 1 km^{2} (0.386 sq mi or 247 acres) and river estuaries.

Mareugheol (French pronunciation: [maʁœʒɔl]; Occitan: Maruege) is a commune in the Puy-de-Dôme department in Auvergne-Rhône-Alpes in central France.

== See also ==
- Communes of the Puy-de-Dôme department
