= Plauzat =

- Commune
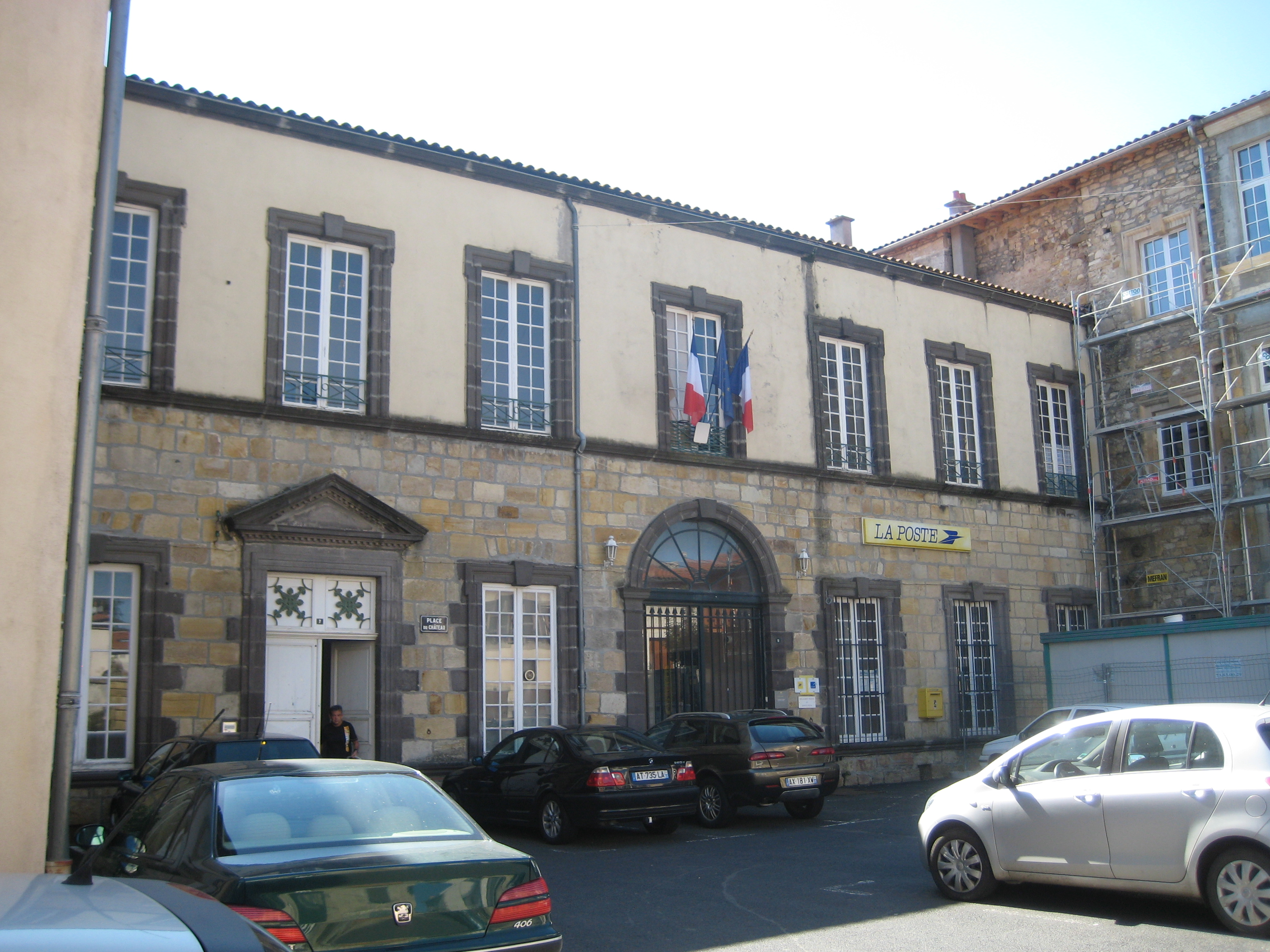
- The town hall in Plauzat

- Coat of arms
- Location of Plauzat
- Location within France Location within Auvergne-Rhône-Alpes
- Coordinates: 45°37′19″N 3°08′56″E
- Country: France
- Region: Auvergne-Rhône-Alpes
- Department: Puy-de-Dôme
- Arrondissement: Issoire
- Canton: Vic-le-Comte
- Intercommunality: Agglo Pays d'Issoire

Government
  - Mayor (2026–32): Jean-Marie Desvignes
- Area^{1}: 13.01 km^{2} (5.02 sq mi)
- Elevation: 385 m (1,263 ft)
- Highest elevation: 740 m (2,430 ft)
- Lowest elevation: 384 m (1,260 ft)
- Population (2023): 1,641
  - Density: 126.1/km^{2} (326.7/sq mi)
- Time zone: UTC+01:00 (CET)
  - Summer (DST): UTC+02:00 (CEST)
- INSEE/Postal code: 63282 /63730
- ^{1} French Land Register data, which excludes lakes, ponds, glaciers > 1 km^{2} (0.386 sq mi or 247 acres) and river estuaries.

Plauzat (French pronunciation: [ploza]) is a commune in the Puy-de-Dôme department in Auvergne in central France.

== See also ==
- Communes of the Puy-de-Dôme department
