= Ternant-les-Eaux =

- Commune
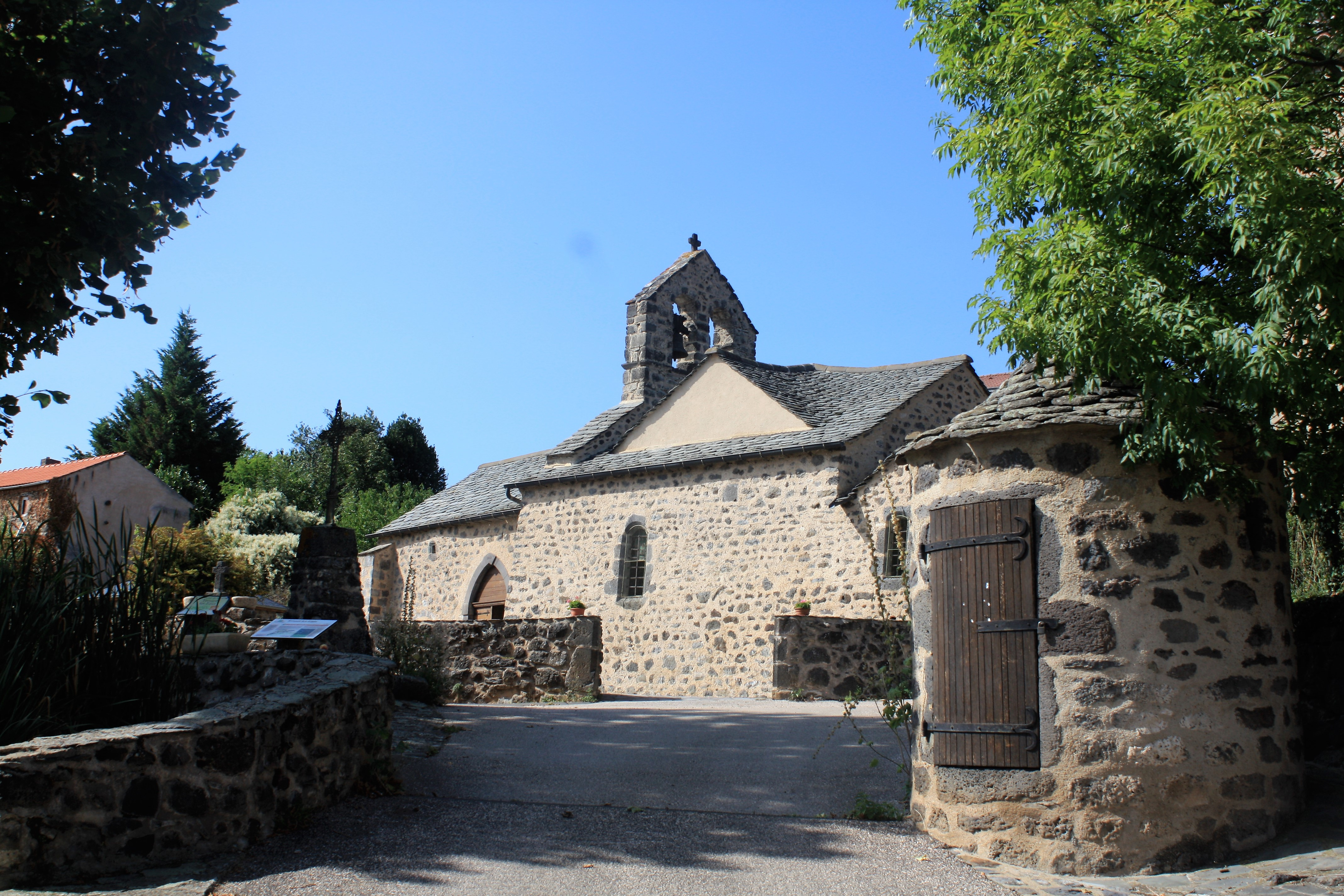
- The church in Ternant-les-Eaux

- Coat of arms
- Location of Ternant-les-Eaux
- Location within France Location within Auvergne-Rhône-Alpes
- Coordinates: 45°28′44″N 3°07′59″E
- Country: France
- Region: Auvergne-Rhône-Alpes
- Department: Puy-de-Dôme
- Arrondissement: Issoire
- Canton: Brassac-les-Mines
- Intercommunality: Agglo Pays d'Issoire

Government
  - Mayor (2026–32): Lionel Arnault
- Area^{1}: 3.59 km^{2} (1.39 sq mi)
- Elevation: 650 m (2,130 ft)
- Highest elevation: 871 m (2,858 ft)
- Lowest elevation: 558 m (1,831 ft)
- Population (2023): 59
  - Density: 16/km^{2} (43/sq mi)
- Time zone: UTC+01:00 (CET)
  - Summer (DST): UTC+02:00 (CEST)
- INSEE/Postal code: 63429 /63340
- ^{1} French Land Register data, which excludes lakes, ponds, glaciers > 1 km^{2} (0.386 sq mi or 247 acres) and river estuaries.

Ternant-les-Eaux (French pronunciation: [tɛʁnɑ̃ le.z‿o]) is a commune in the Puy-de-Dôme department in Auvergne in central France.

== See also ==
- Communes of the Puy-de-Dôme department
