= Villeneuve, Puy-de-Dôme =

Villeneuve
- Commune
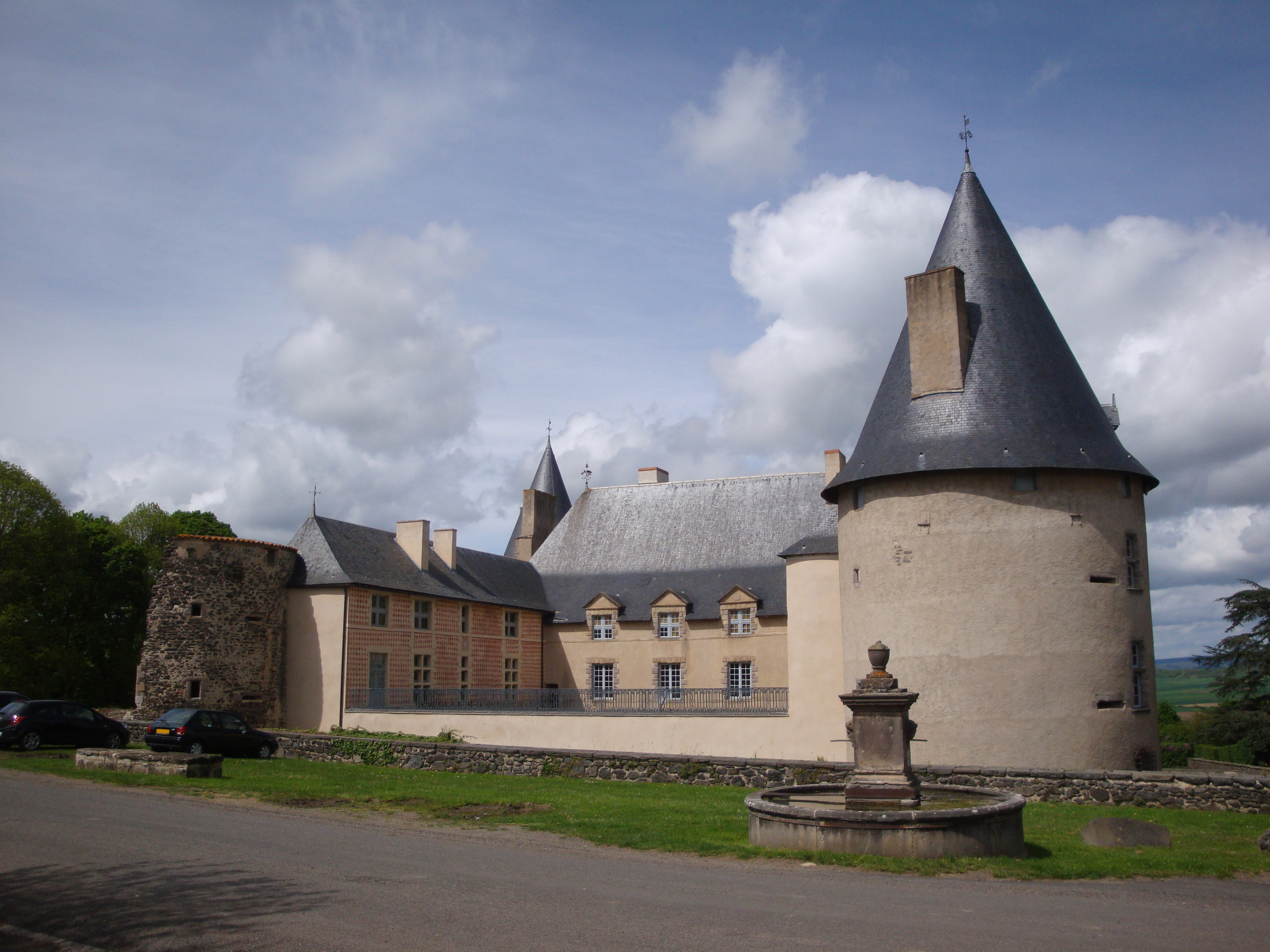
- The chateau in Villeneuve

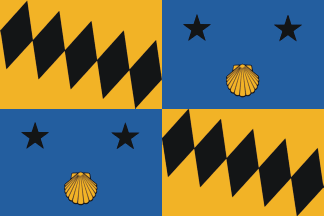
- Flag Coat of arms
- Location of Villeneuve
- Location within France Location within Auvergne-Rhône-Alpes
- Coordinates: 45°28′29″N 3°11′22″E
- Country: France
- Region: Auvergne-Rhône-Alpes
- Department: Puy-de-Dôme
- Arrondissement: Issoire
- Canton: Brassac-les-Mines
- Intercommunality: Agglo Pays d'Issoire

Government
  - Mayor (2026–32): Véronique Leroy
- Area^{1}: 4.23 km^{2} (1.63 sq mi)
- Elevation: 460 m (1,510 ft)
- Highest elevation: 673 m (2,208 ft)
- Lowest elevation: 436 m (1,430 ft)
- Population (2023): 135
  - Density: 31.9/km^{2} (82.7/sq mi)
- Time zone: UTC+01:00 (CET)
  - Summer (DST): UTC+02:00 (CEST)
- INSEE/Postal code: 63458 /63340
- ^{1} French Land Register data, which excludes lakes, ponds, glaciers > 1 km^{2} (0.386 sq mi or 247 acres) and river estuaries.

Villeneuve (French pronunciation: [vilnœv]; Auvergnat: Vialanòva) is a commune in the Puy-de-Dôme department in Auvergne in central France.

== See also ==
- Communes of the Puy-de-Dôme department
