= Gignat =

- Commune
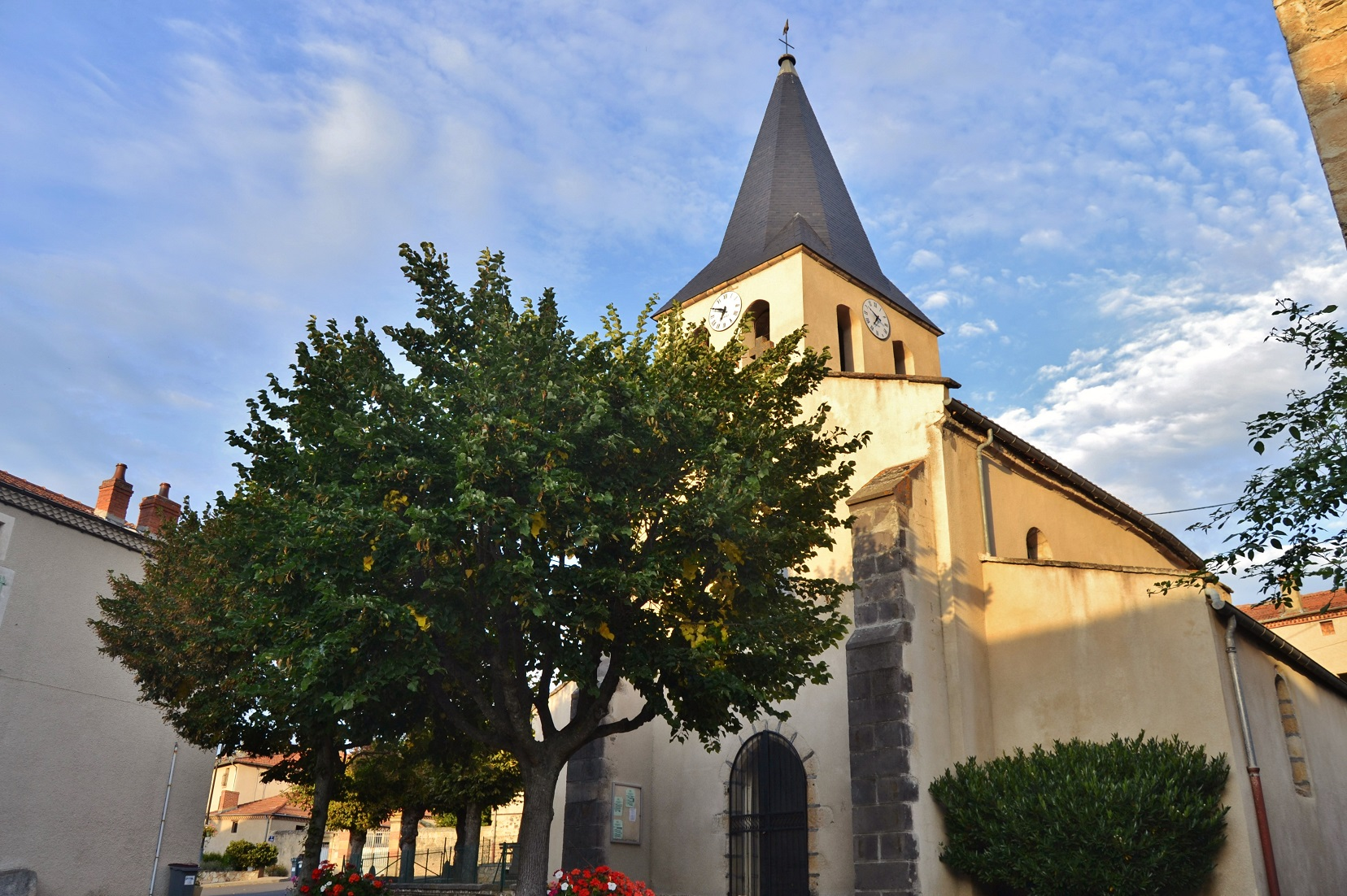
- The church in Gignat

- Coat of arms
- Location of Gignat
- Location within France Location within Auvergne-Rhône-Alpes
- Coordinates: 45°28′51″N 3°13′16″E
- Country: France
- Region: Auvergne-Rhône-Alpes
- Department: Puy-de-Dôme
- Arrondissement: Issoire
- Canton: Brassac-les-Mines
- Intercommunality: Agglo Pays d'Issoire

Government
  - Mayor (2020–2026): Jean-Louis Besson
- Area^{1}: 3.49 km^{2} (1.35 sq mi)
- Elevation: 420 m (1,380 ft)
- Highest elevation: 564 m (1,850 ft)
- Lowest elevation: 415 m (1,362 ft)
- Population (2023): 257
  - Density: 73.6/km^{2} (191/sq mi)
- Time zone: UTC+01:00 (CET)
  - Summer (DST): UTC+02:00 (CEST)
- INSEE/Postal code: 63166 /63340
- ^{1} French Land Register data, which excludes lakes, ponds, glaciers > 1 km^{2} (0.386 sq mi or 247 acres) and river estuaries.

Gignat (French pronunciation: [ʒiɲa]; Occitan: Ginhac) is a commune in the Puy-de-Dôme department in Auvergne in central France.

== See also ==
- Communes of the Puy-de-Dôme department
