= Canton of Brassac-les-Mines =

Coordinates: 45.41°N 3.33°E

The canton of Brassac-les-Mines is an administrative division of the Puy-de-Dôme department, central France. It was created at the French canton reorganisation which came into effect in March 2015. Its seat is in Brassac-les-Mines.

It consists of the following communes:

1. Antoingt
2. Anzat-le-Luguet
3. Apchat
4. Ardes
5. Augnat
6. Auzat-la-Combelle
7. Bansat
8. Beaulieu
9. Bergonne
10. Boudes
11. Brassac-les-Mines
12. Le Breuil-sur-Couze
13. Chalus
14. Champagnat-le-Jeune
15. La Chapelle-Marcousse
16. La Chapelle-sur-Usson
17. Charbonnier-les-Mines
18. Chassagne
19. Collanges
20. Dauzat-sur-Vodable
21. Égliseneuve-des-Liards
22. Esteil
23. Gignat
24. La Godivelle
25. Jumeaux
26. Lamontgie
27. Madriat
28. Mareugheol
29. Mazoires
30. Moriat
31. Nonette-Orsonnette
32. Parentignat
33. Peslières
34. Les Pradeaux
35. Rentières
36. Roche-Charles-la-Mayrand
37. Saint-Alyre-ès-Montagne
38. Saint-Étienne-sur-Usson
39. Saint-Genès-la-Tourette
40. Saint-Germain-Lembron
41. Saint-Gervazy
42. Saint-Hérent
43. Saint-Jean-en-Val
44. Saint-Jean-Saint-Gervais
45. Saint-Martin-d'Ollières
46. Saint-Martin-des-Plains
47. Saint-Quentin-sur-Sauxillanges
48. Saint-Rémy-de-Chargnat
49. Sauxillanges
50. Sugères
51. Ternant-les-Eaux
52. Usson
53. Valz-sous-Châteauneuf
54. Varennes-sur-Usson
55. Le Vernet-Chaméane
56. Vichel
57. Villeneuve
