= La Chapelle-sur-Usson =

- Commune
- Location of La Chapelle-sur-Usson
- Location within France Location within Auvergne-Rhône-Alpes
- Coordinates: 45°28′02″N 3°24′03″E
- Country: France
- Region: Auvergne-Rhône-Alpes
- Department: Puy-de-Dôme
- Arrondissement: Issoire
- Canton: Brassac-les-Mines
- Intercommunality: Agglo Pays d'Issoire

Government
  - Mayor (2026–32): Eric Trilleaud
- Area^{1}: 6.78 km^{2} (2.62 sq mi)
- Elevation: 650 m (2,130 ft)
- Highest elevation: 728 m (2,388 ft)
- Lowest elevation: 517 m (1,696 ft)
- Population (2023): 85
  - Density: 13/km^{2} (32/sq mi)
- Time zone: UTC+01:00 (CET)
  - Summer (DST): UTC+02:00 (CEST)
- INSEE/Postal code: 63088 /63580
- ^{1} French Land Register data, which excludes lakes, ponds, glaciers > 1 km^{2} (0.386 sq mi or 247 acres) and river estuaries.

La Chapelle-sur-Usson (French pronunciation: [la ʃapɛl syʁ ysɔ̃], literally La Chapelle on Usson) is a commune in the Puy-de-Dôme department in Auvergne-Rhône-Alpes in central France.

== See also ==
- Communes of the Puy-de-Dôme department
