= Madriat =

- Commune
- Coat of arms
- Location of Madriat
- Location within France Location within Auvergne-Rhône-Alpes
- Coordinates: 45°26′01″N 3°11′16″E
- Country: France
- Region: Auvergne-Rhône-Alpes
- Department: Puy-de-Dôme
- Arrondissement: Issoire
- Canton: Brassac-les-Mines
- Intercommunality: Agglo Pays d'Issoire

Government
  - Mayor (2026–32): Sylviane Anglaret
- Area^{1}: 4.69 km^{2} (1.81 sq mi)
- Highest elevation: 943 m (3,094 ft)
- Lowest elevation: 453 m (1,486 ft)
- Population (2023): 136
  - Density: 29.0/km^{2} (75.1/sq mi)
- Time zone: UTC+01:00 (CET)
  - Summer (DST): UTC+02:00 (CEST)
- INSEE/Postal code: 63202 /63340
- ^{1} French Land Register data, which excludes lakes, ponds, glaciers > 1 km^{2} (0.386 sq mi or 247 acres) and river estuaries.

Madriat (French pronunciation: [madʁija]) is a commune in the Puy-de-Dôme department in Auvergne in central France.

== See also ==
- Communes of the Puy-de-Dôme department
