= Agglo Pays d'Issoire =

- Communauté d'agglomération
- Interactive map of Agglo Pays d'Issoire
- Coordinates: 45°30′N 03°14′E
- Country: France
- Region: Auvergne-Rhône-Alpes
- Department: Puy-de-Dôme
- No. of communes: {{{nbcomm}}}
- Established: 2017
- Area: 1,017.9 km^{2} (393.0 sq mi)
- Population (2019): 56,851
  - Density: 55.851/km^{2} (144.65/sq mi)
- Website: www.capissoire.fr

Agglo Pays d'Issoire is the communauté d'agglomération, an intercommunal structure, centred on the town of Issoire. It is located in the Puy-de-Dôme department, in the Auvergne-Rhône-Alpes region, central France. Created in 2017, its seat is in Issoire. Its area is 1,017.9 km^{2}. Its population was 56,851 in 2019, of which 15,296 in Issoire proper.

== Composition ==
The communauté d'agglomération consists of the following 87 communes:

1. Antoingt
2. Anzat-le-Luguet
3. Apchat
4. Ardes
5. Augnat
6. Aulhat-Flat
7. Auzat-la-Combelle
8. Bansat
9. Beaulieu
10. Bergonne
11. Boudes
12. Brassac-les-Mines
13. Brenat
14. Le Breuil-sur-Couze
15. Le Broc
16. Chadeleuf
17. Chalus
18. Champagnat-le-Jeune
19. Champeix
20. La Chapelle-Marcousse
21. La Chapelle-sur-Usson
22. Charbonnier-les-Mines
23. Chassagne
24. Clémensat
25. Collanges
26. Coudes
27. Courgoul
28. Dauzat-sur-Vodable
29. Les Deux-Rives
30. Égliseneuve-des-Liards
31. Esteil
32. Gignat
33. Grandeyrolles
34. Issoire
35. Jumeaux
36. Lamontgie
37. Ludesse
38. Madriat
39. Mareugheol
40. Mazoires
41. Meilhaud
42. Montaigut-le-Blanc
43. Montpeyroux
44. Moriat
45. Neschers
46. Nonette-Orsonnette
47. Orbeil
48. Pardines
49. Parent
50. Parentignat
51. Perrier
52. Peslières
53. Plauzat
54. Les Pradeaux
55. Rentières
56. Roche-Charles-la-Mayrand
57. Saint-Alyre-ès-Montagne
58. Saint-Babel
59. Saint-Étienne-sur-Usson
60. Saint-Floret
61. Saint-Genès-la-Tourette
62. Saint-Germain-Lembron
63. Saint-Gervazy
64. Saint-Hérent
65. Saint-Jean-en-Val
66. Saint-Jean-Saint-Gervais
67. Saint-Martin-des-Plains
68. Saint-Martin-d'Ollières
69. Saint-Quentin-sur-Sauxillanges
70. Saint-Rémy-de-Chargnat
71. Saint-Vincent
72. Saint-Yvoine
73. Saurier
74. Sauvagnat-Sainte-Marthe
75. Sauxillanges
76. Solignat
77. Sugères
78. Ternant-les-Eaux
79. Tourzel-Ronzières
80. Usson
81. Valz-sous-Châteauneuf
82. Varennes-sur-Usson
83. Le Vernet-Chaméane
84. Verrières
85. Vichel
86. Villeneuve
87. Vodable
