= Lamontgie =

- Commune
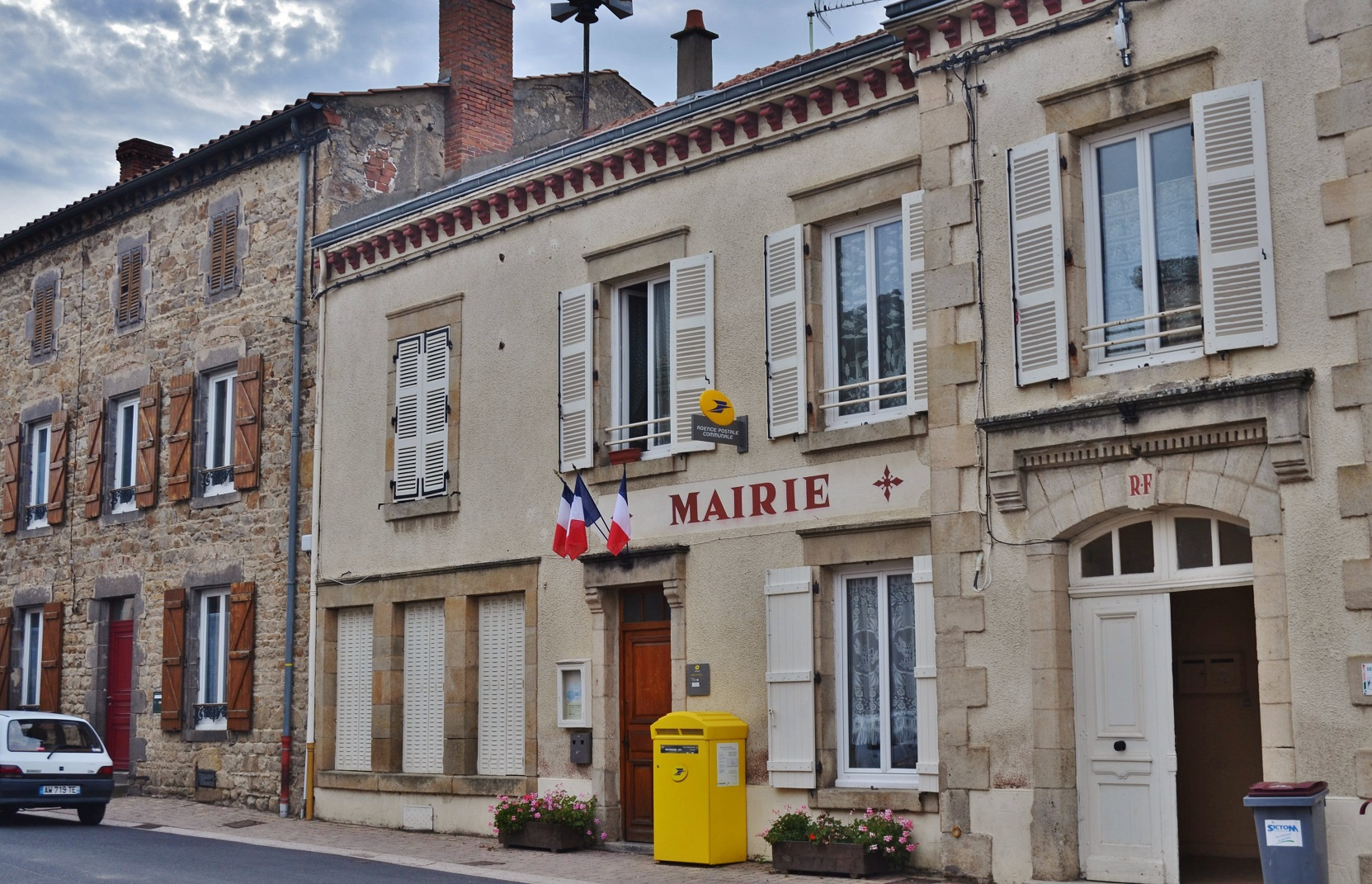
- The town hall in Lamontgie

- Coat of arms
- Location of Lamontgie
- Location within France Location within Auvergne-Rhône-Alpes
- Coordinates: 45°28′32″N 3°20′04″E
- Country: France
- Region: Auvergne-Rhône-Alpes
- Department: Puy-de-Dôme
- Arrondissement: Issoire
- Canton: Brassac-les-Mines
- Intercommunality: Agglo Pays d'Issoire

Government
  - Mayor (2020–2026): Nadine Herbst
- Area^{1}: 7.09 km^{2} (2.74 sq mi)
- Elevation: 482 m (1,581 ft)
- Highest elevation: 676 m (2,218 ft)
- Lowest elevation: 410 m (1,350 ft)
- Population (2023): 643
  - Density: 90.7/km^{2} (235/sq mi)
- Time zone: UTC+01:00 (CET)
  - Summer (DST): UTC+02:00 (CEST)
- INSEE/Postal code: 63185 /63570
- ^{1} French Land Register data, which excludes lakes, ponds, glaciers > 1 km^{2} (0.386 sq mi or 247 acres) and river estuaries.

Lamontgie (French pronunciation: [lamɔ̃ʒi]; Occitan: La Mongiá) is a commune in the Puy-de-Dôme department in Auvergne in central France.

== See also ==
- Communes of the Puy-de-Dôme department
