= Antoingt =

- Commune
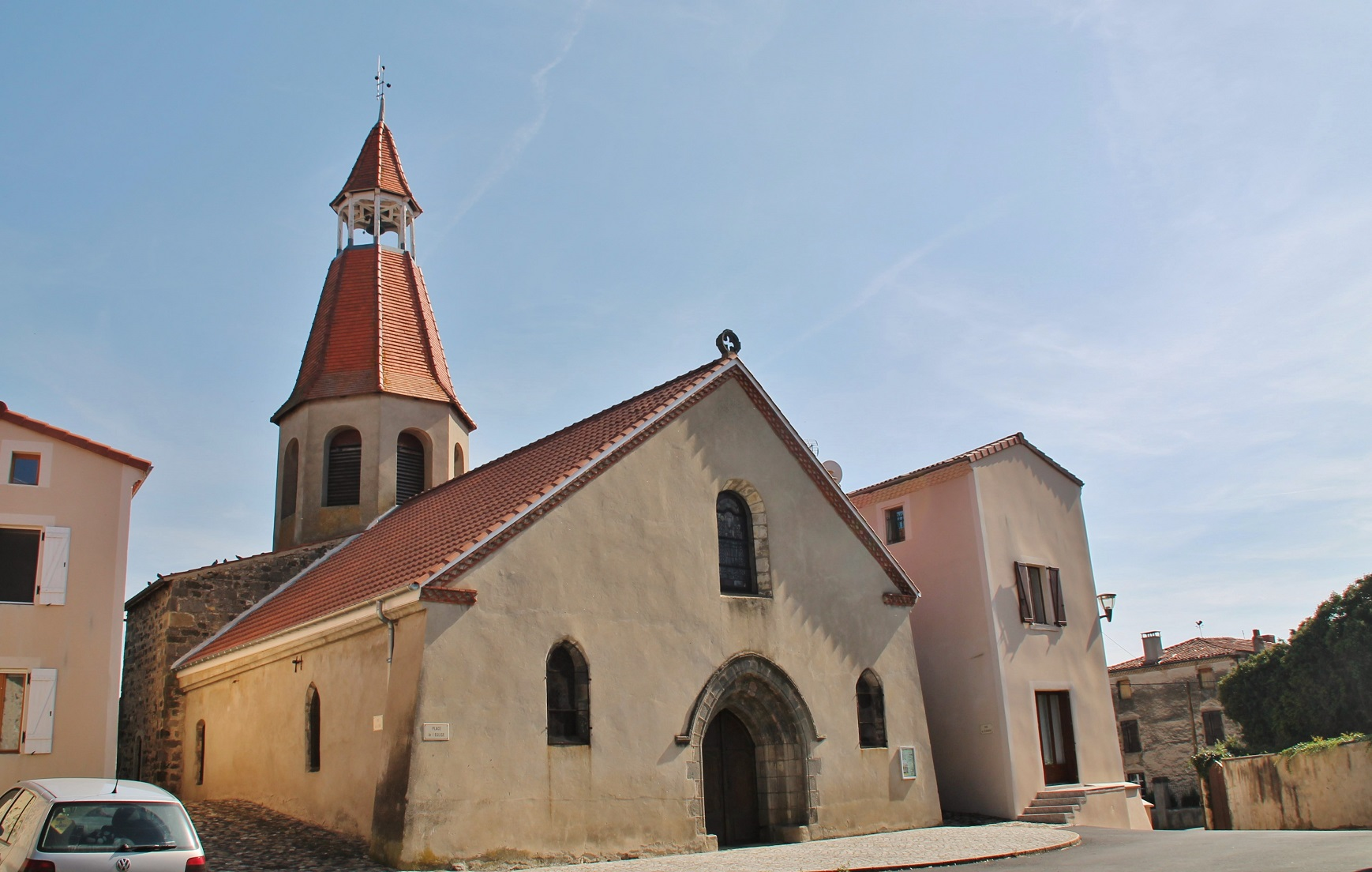
- The church in Antoingt
- Location of Antoingt
- Location within France Location within Auvergne-Rhône-Alpes
- Coordinates: 45°29′48″N 3°10′46″E
- Country: France
- Region: Auvergne-Rhône-Alpes
- Department: Puy-de-Dôme
- Arrondissement: Issoire
- Canton: Brassac-les-Mines
- Intercommunality: Agglo Pays d'Issoire

Government
  - Mayor (2026–32): Emmanuel Gonthier
- Area^{1}: 7.83 km^{2} (3.02 sq mi)
- Elevation: 410 m (1,350 ft)
- Highest elevation: 610 m (2,000 ft)
- Lowest elevation: 437 m (1,434 ft)
- Population (2023): 413
  - Density: 52.7/km^{2} (137/sq mi)
- Time zone: UTC+01:00 (CET)
  - Summer (DST): UTC+02:00 (CEST)
- INSEE/Postal code: 63005 /63340
- ^{1} French Land Register data, which excludes lakes, ponds, glaciers > 1 km^{2} (0.386 sq mi or 247 acres) and river estuaries.

Antoingt (French pronunciation: [ɑ̃twɛ̃]; Occitan: Antonh) is a commune in the Puy-de-Dôme department in Auvergne-Rhône-Alpes in central France. It is in the canton of Brassac-les-Mines.

== Administration ==
- 2008–2014: Hubert Bory
- 2014–2020: Chantal Roussel
- 2020–current: Emmanuel Gonthier

== Population ==
Historical population
Year	Pop.	±% p.a.
1968	362	—
1975	357	−0.20%
1982	368	+0.43%
1990	376	+0.27%
1999	335	−1.27%
2007	370	+1.25%
2012	381	+0.59%
2017	397	+0.83%
2023	413	+0.66%
Source: INSEE

== See also ==
- Communes of the Puy-de-Dôme department
