= Saint-Martin-d'Ollières =

- Commune
- Location of Saint-Martin-d'Ollières
- Location within France Location within Auvergne-Rhône-Alpes
- Coordinates: 45°25′19″N 3°27′00″E
- Country: France
- Region: Auvergne-Rhône-Alpes
- Department: Puy-de-Dôme
- Arrondissement: Issoire
- Canton: Brassac-les-Mines
- Intercommunality: Agglo Pays d'Issoire

Government
  - Mayor (2026–32): Damien Gaudriault
- Area^{1}: 14.47 km^{2} (5.59 sq mi)
- Elevation: 749 m (2,457 ft)
- Population (2023): 149
  - Density: 10.3/km^{2} (26.7/sq mi)
- Time zone: UTC+01:00 (CET)
  - Summer (DST): UTC+02:00 (CEST)
- INSEE/Postal code: 63376 /63580
- ^{1} French Land Register data, which excludes lakes, ponds, glaciers > 1 km^{2} (0.386 sq mi or 247 acres) and river estuaries.

Saint-Martin-d'Ollières (French pronunciation: [sɛ̃ maʁtɛ̃ dɔljɛʁ]) is a commune in the Puy-de-Dôme department in Auvergne in central France.

== See also ==
- Communes of the Puy-de-Dôme department
