= Chadeleuf =

- Commune
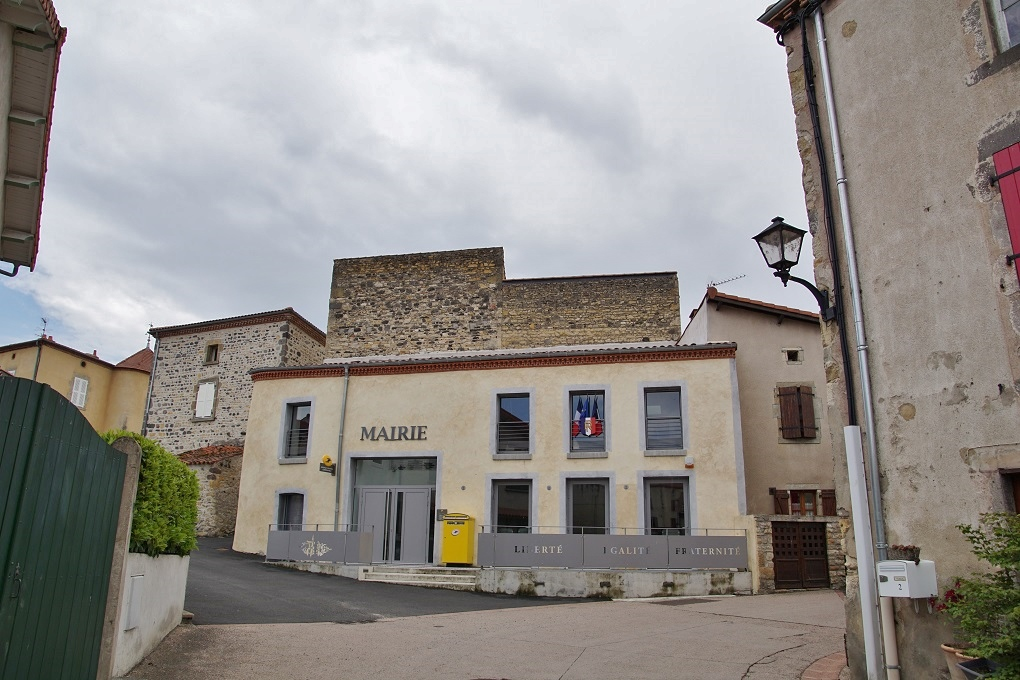
- Town hall
- Location of Chadeleuf
- Location within France Location within Auvergne-Rhône-Alpes
- Coordinates: 45°35′16″N 3°10′48″E
- Country: France
- Region: Auvergne-Rhône-Alpes
- Department: Puy-de-Dôme
- Arrondissement: Issoire
- Canton: Vic-le-Comte
- Intercommunality: Agglo Pays d'Issoire

Government
  - Mayor (2020–2026): Jean-Pierre Sauvant
- Area^{1}: 5.7 km^{2} (2.2 sq mi)
- Elevation: 459 m (1,506 ft)
- Highest elevation: 611 m (2,005 ft)
- Lowest elevation: 395 m (1,296 ft)
- Population (2023): 427
  - Density: 75/km^{2} (190/sq mi)
- Time zone: UTC+01:00 (CET)
  - Summer (DST): UTC+02:00 (CEST)
- INSEE/Postal code: 63073 /63320
- ^{1} French Land Register data, which excludes lakes, ponds, glaciers > 1 km^{2} (0.386 sq mi or 247 acres) and river estuaries.

Chadeleuf (French pronunciation: [ʃadlœf]; Occitan: Chadalèu) is a commune in the Puy-de-Dôme department in Auvergne-Rhône-Alpes in central France.

== See also ==
- Communes of the Puy-de-Dôme department
