= Esteil =

- Commune
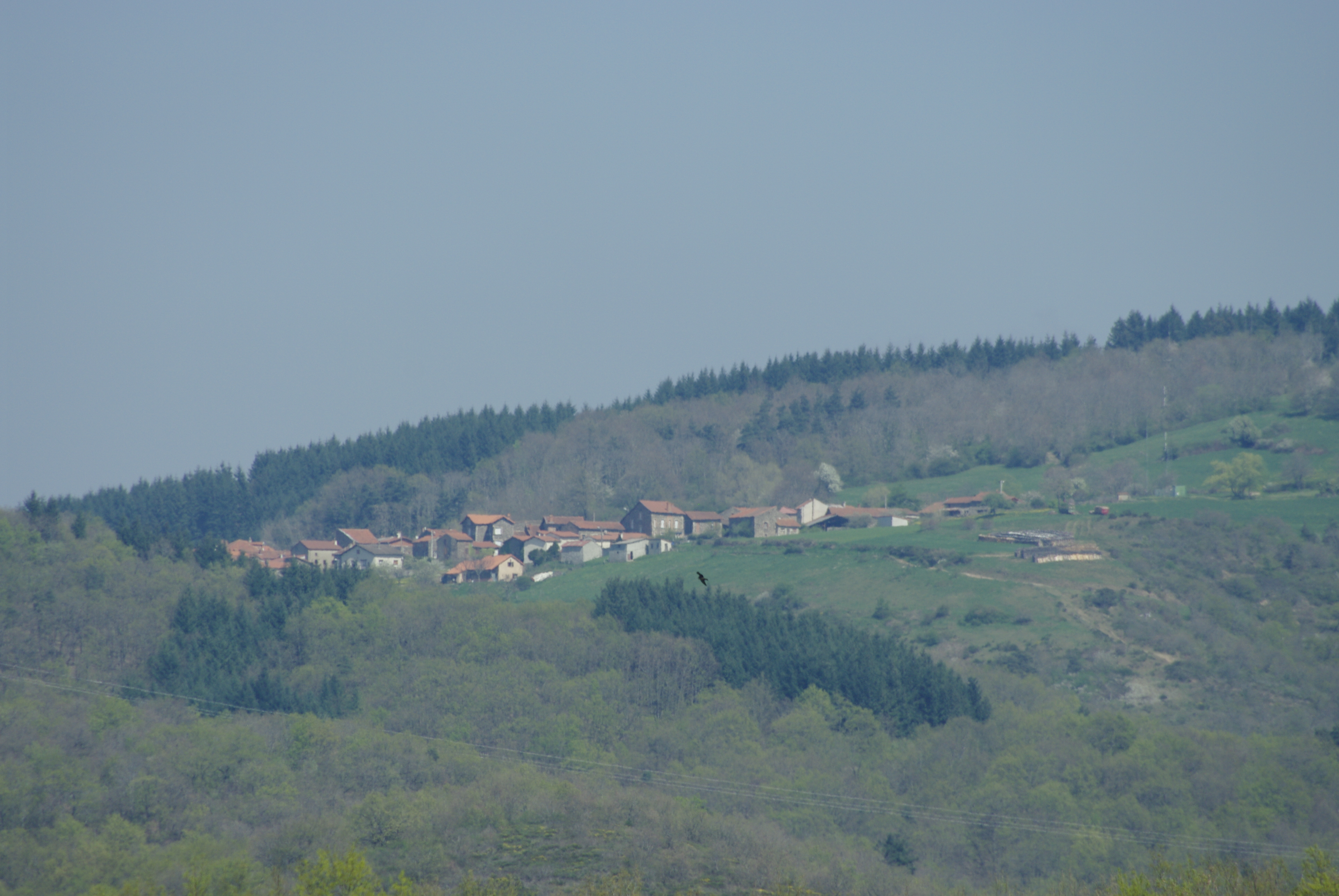
- A general view of Esteil

- Coat of arms
- Location of Esteil
- Location within France Location within Auvergne-Rhône-Alpes
- Coordinates: 45°27′12″N 3°22′02″E
- Country: France
- Region: Auvergne-Rhône-Alpes
- Department: Puy-de-Dôme
- Arrondissement: Issoire
- Canton: Brassac-les-Mines
- Intercommunality: Agglo Pays d'Issoire

Government
  - Mayor (2026–32): François Thalaud
- Area^{1}: 4.55 km^{2} (1.76 sq mi)
- Elevation: 720 m (2,360 ft)
- Highest elevation: 813 m (2,667 ft)
- Lowest elevation: 515 m (1,690 ft)
- Population (2023): 54
  - Density: 12/km^{2} (31/sq mi)
- Time zone: UTC+01:00 (CET)
  - Summer (DST): UTC+02:00 (CEST)
- INSEE/Postal code: 63156 /63570
- ^{1} French Land Register data, which excludes lakes, ponds, glaciers > 1 km^{2} (0.386 sq mi or 247 acres) and river estuaries.

Esteil (French pronunciation: [ɛstɛj]; Occitan: Estelh) is a commune in the Puy-de-Dôme department in Auvergne in central France.

== See also ==
- Communes of the Puy-de-Dôme department
