= Arrondissement of Issoire =

Coordinates: 45°32′N 3°14′E

Issoire
- Arrondissement
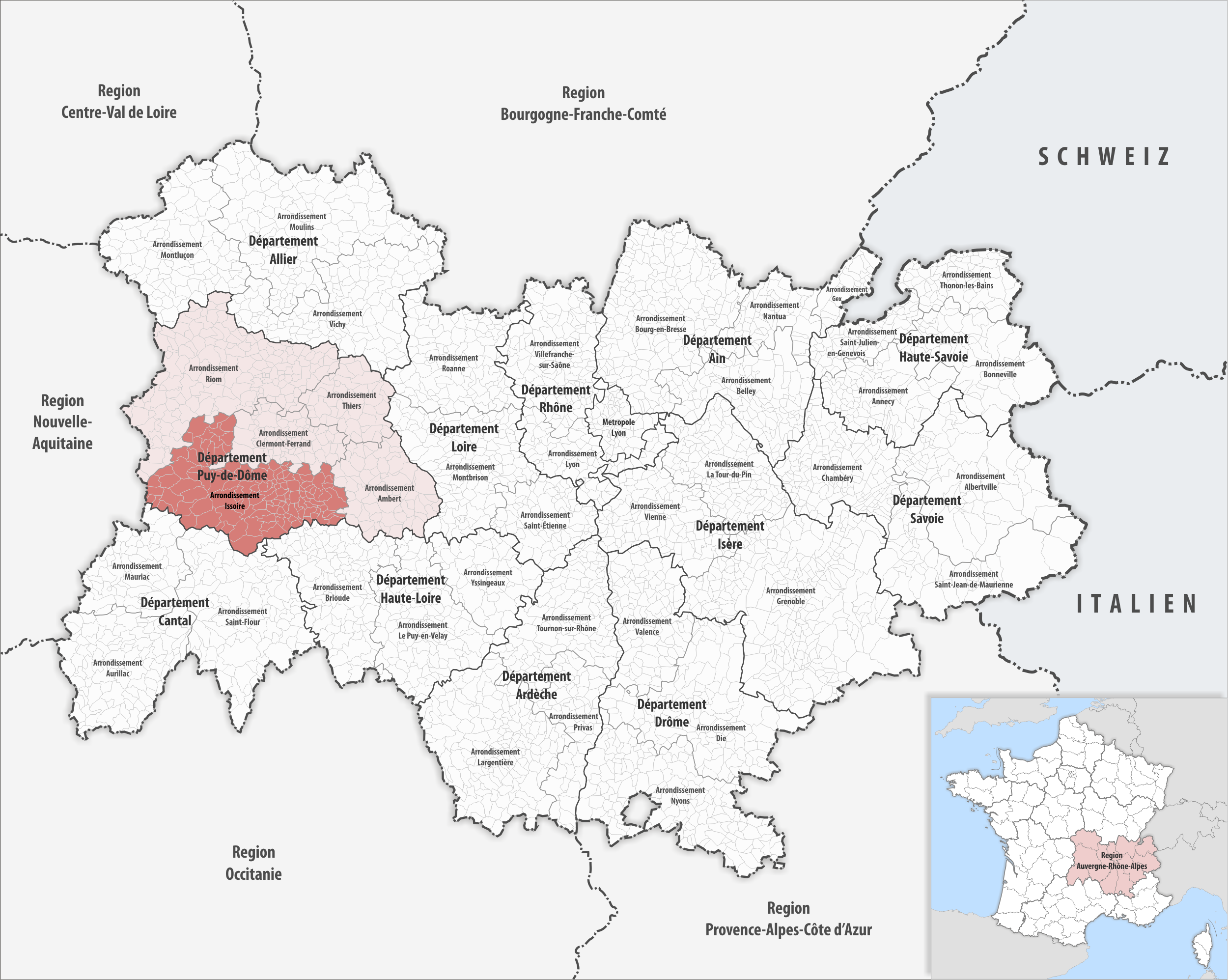
- Location within the region Auvergne-Rhône-Alpes
- Country: France
- Region: Auvergne-Rhône-Alpes
- Department: Puy-de-Dôme
- No. of communes: {{{nbcomm}}}
- Area: 2,296.7 km^{2} (886.8 sq mi)
- Population (2023): 78,814
  - Density: 34.316/km^{2} (88.879/sq mi)
- INSEE code: 633

The Arrondissement of Issoire is an arrondissement of France in the Puy-de-Dôme department in the Auvergne-Rhône-Alpes region. It has 133 communes. Its population is 78,742 (2021), and its area is 2,296.7 km^{2} (886.8 sq mi).

== Composition ==
The communes of the arrondissement of Issoire, and their INSEE codes, are:

1. Antoingt (63005)
2. Anzat-le-Luguet (63006)
3. Apchat (63007)
4. Ardes (63009)
5. Augnat (63017)
6. Aulhat-Flat (63160)
7. Aurières (63020)
8. Auzat-la-Combelle (63022)
9. Avèze (63024)
10. Bagnols (63028)
11. Bansat (63029)
12. Beaulieu (63031)
13. Bergonne (63036)
14. Besse-et-Saint-Anastaise (63038)
15. Boudes (63046)
16. La Bourboule (63047)
17. Brassac-les-Mines (63050)
18. Brenat (63051)
19. Le Breuil-sur-Couze (63052)
20. Le Broc (63054)
21. Ceyssat (63071)
22. Chadeleuf (63073)
23. Chalus (63074)
24. Chambon-sur-Lac (63077)
25. Champagnat-le-Jeune (63079)
26. Champeix (63080)
27. La Chapelle-Marcousse (63087)
28. La Chapelle-sur-Usson (63088)
29. Charbonnier-les-Mines (63091)
30. Chassagne (63097)
31. Chastreix (63098)
32. Clémensat (63111)
33. Collanges (63114)
34. Compains (63117)
35. Coudes (63121)
36. Courgoul (63122)
37. Cros (63129)
38. Dauzat-sur-Vodable (63134)
39. Les Deux-Rives (63109)
40. Égliseneuve-d'Entraigues (63144)
41. Égliseneuve-des-Liards (63145)
42. Espinchal (63153)
43. Esteil (63156)
44. Gelles (63163)
45. Gignat (63166)
46. La Godivelle (63169)
47. Grandeyrolles (63172)
48. Heume-l'Église (63176)
49. Issoire (63178)
50. Jumeaux (63182)
51. Labessette (63183)
52. Lamontgie (63185)
53. Laqueuille (63189)
54. Larodde (63190)
55. Ludesse (63199)
56. Madriat (63202)
57. Mareugheol (63209)
58. Mazaye (63219)
59. Mazoires (63220)
60. Meilhaud (63222)
61. Montaigut-le-Blanc (63234)
62. Mont-Dore (63236)
63. Montpeyroux (63241)
64. Moriat (63242)
65. Murat-le-Quaire (63246)
66. Murol (63247)
67. Nébouzat (63248)
68. Neschers (63250)
69. Nonette-Orsonnette (63255)
70. Olby (63257)
71. Orbeil (63261)
72. Orcival (63264)
73. Pardines (63268)
74. Parent (63269)
75. Parentignat (63270)
76. Perpezat (63274)
77. Perrier (63275)
78. Peslières (63277)
79. Picherande (63279)
80. Plauzat (63282)
81. Les Pradeaux (63287)
82. Rentières (63299)
83. Roche-Charles-la-Mayrand (63303)
84. Rochefort-Montagne (63305)
85. Saint-Alyre-ès-Montagne (63313)
86. Saint-Babel (63321)
87. Saint-Bonnet-près-Orcival (63326)
88. Saint-Diéry (63335)
89. Saint-Donat (63336)
90. Saint-Étienne-sur-Usson (63340)
91. Saint-Floret (63342)
92. Saint-Genès-Champespe (63346)
93. Saint-Genès-la-Tourette (63348)
94. Saint-Germain-Lembron (63352)
95. Saint-Gervazy (63356)
96. Saint-Hérent (63357)
97. Saint-Jean-en-Val (63366)
98. Saint-Jean-Saint-Gervais (63367)
99. Saint-Julien-Puy-Lavèze (63370)
100. Saint-Martin-des-Plains (63375)
101. Saint-Martin-d'Ollières (63376)
102. Saint-Nectaire (63380)
103. Saint-Pierre-Colamine (63383)
104. Saint-Pierre-Roche (63386)
105. Saint-Quentin-sur-Sauxillanges (63389)
106. Saint-Rémy-de-Chargnat (63392)
107. Saint-Sauves-d'Auvergne (63397)
108. Saint-Victor-la-Rivière (63401)
109. Saint-Vincent (63403)
110. Saint-Yvoine (63404)
111. Saulzet-le-Froid (63407)
112. Saurier (63409)
113. Sauvagnat-Sainte-Marthe (63411)
114. Sauxillanges (63415)
115. Singles (63421)
116. Solignat (63422)
117. Sugères (63423)
118. Tauves (63426)
119. Ternant-les-Eaux (63429)
120. La Tour-d'Auvergne (63192)
121. Tourzel-Ronzières (63435)
122. Trémouille-Saint-Loup (63437)
123. Usson (63439)
124. Valbeleix (63440)
125. Valz-sous-Châteauneuf (63442)
126. Varennes-sur-Usson (63444)
127. Le Vernet-Chaméane (63448)
128. Le Vernet-Sainte-Marguerite (63449)
129. Vernines (63451)
130. Verrières (63452)
131. Vichel (63456)
132. Villeneuve (63458)
133. Vodable (63466)

== History ==
The arrondissement of Issoire was created in 1800. At the January 2017 reorganisation of the arrondissements of Puy-de-Dôme, it gained 21 communes from the arrondissement of Clermont-Ferrand. In January 2021 it gained the commune of Saulzet-le-Froid from the arrondissement of Clermont-Ferrand.

As a result of the reorganisation of the cantons of France which came into effect in 2015, the borders of the cantons are no longer related to the borders of the arrondissements. The cantons of the arrondissement of Issoire were, as of January 2015:

1. Ardes
2. Besse-et-Saint-Anastaise
3. Champeix
4. Issoire
5. Jumeaux
6. Saint-Germain-Lembron
7. Sauxillanges
8. Tauves
9. La Tour-d'Auvergne
