= Moriat =

- Commune
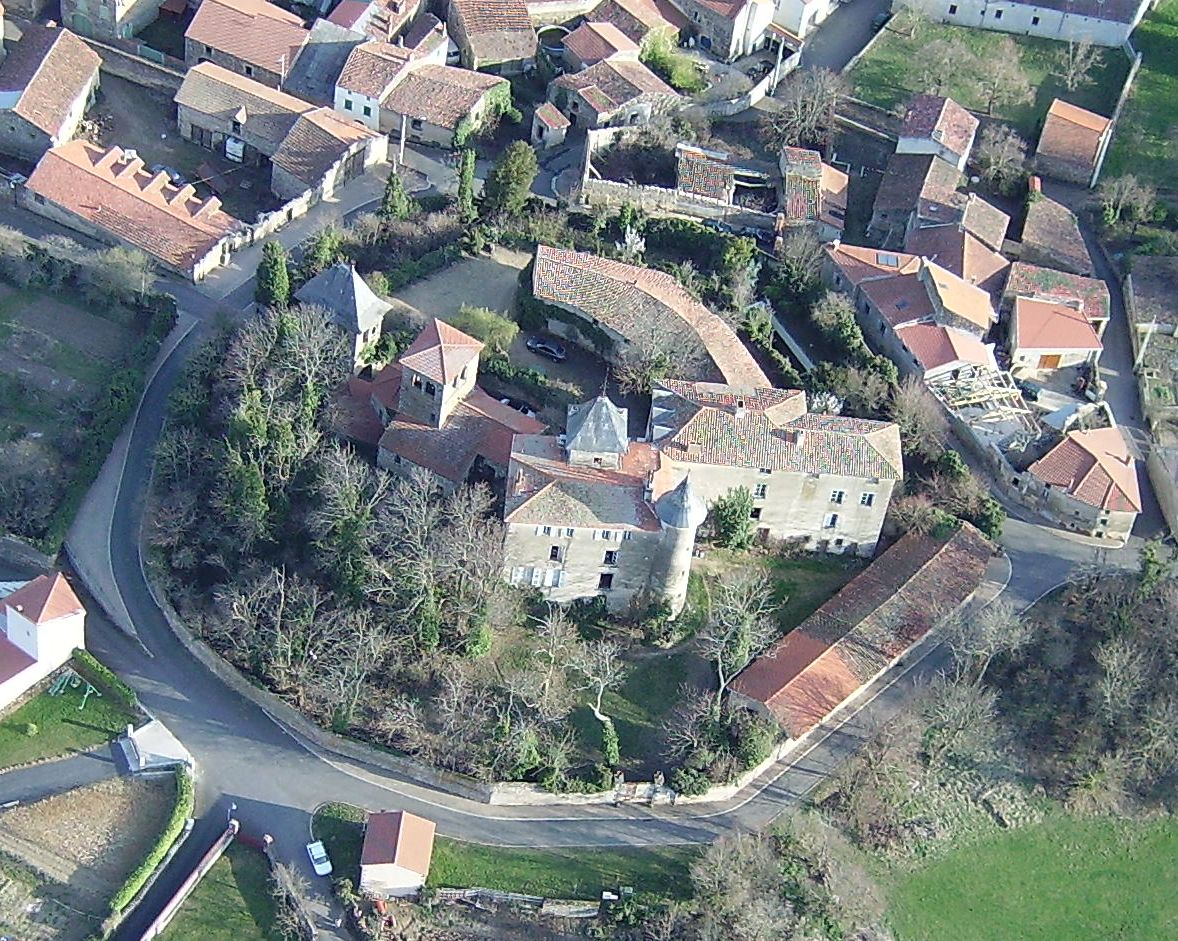
- A general view of Moriat

- Coat of arms
- Location of Moriat
- Location within France Location within Auvergne-Rhône-Alpes
- Coordinates: 45°24′18″N 3°15′40″E
- Country: France
- Region: Auvergne-Rhône-Alpes
- Department: Puy-de-Dôme
- Arrondissement: Issoire
- Canton: Brassac-les-Mines
- Intercommunality: Agglo Pays d'Issoire

Government
  - Mayor (2026–32): Denis Legendre
- Area^{1}: 10.81 km^{2} (4.17 sq mi)
- Elevation: 460 m (1,510 ft)
- Highest elevation: 660 m (2,170 ft)
- Lowest elevation: 419 m (1,375 ft)
- Population (2023): 392
  - Density: 36.3/km^{2} (93.9/sq mi)
- Time zone: UTC+01:00 (CET)
  - Summer (DST): UTC+02:00 (CEST)
- INSEE/Postal code: 63242 /63340
- ^{1} French Land Register data, which excludes lakes, ponds, glaciers > 1 km^{2} (0.386 sq mi or 247 acres) and river estuaries.

Moriat (French pronunciation: [mɔʁja], before 1984: Mauriat) is a commune in the Puy-de-Dôme department in Auvergne in central France.

== See also ==
- Communes of the Puy-de-Dôme department
