= La Chapelle-Marcousse =

- Commune
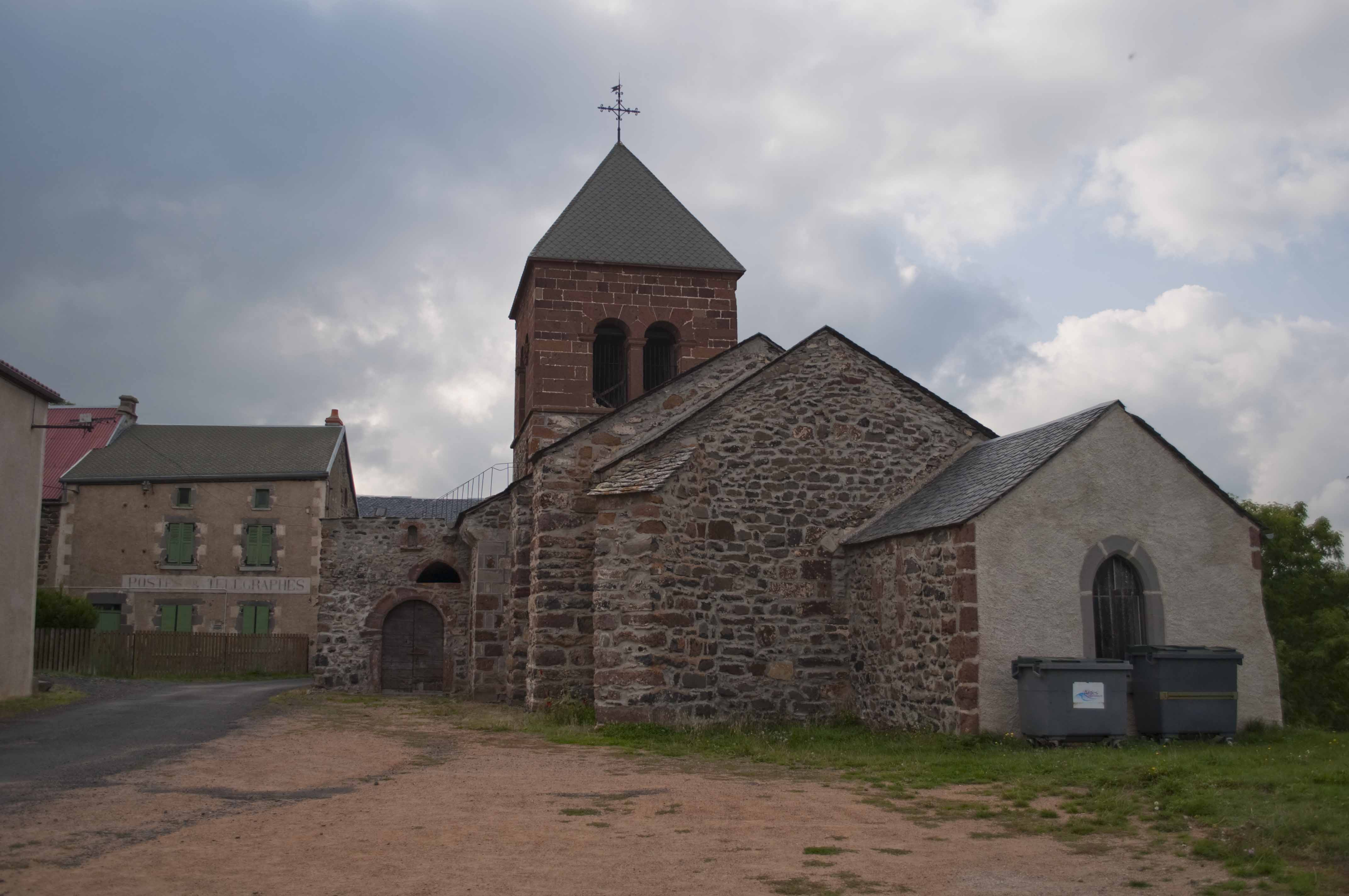
- The church in La Chapelle-Marcousse
- Location of La Chapelle-Marcousse
- Location within France Location within Auvergne-Rhône-Alpes
- Coordinates: 45°26′54″N 3°05′56″E
- Country: France
- Region: Auvergne-Rhône-Alpes
- Department: Puy-de-Dôme
- Arrondissement: Issoire
- Canton: Brassac-les-Mines
- Intercommunality: Agglo Pays d'Issoire

Government
  - Mayor (2020–2026): Laurent Barbet
- Area^{1}: 19.72 km^{2} (7.61 sq mi)
- Elevation: 925 m (3,035 ft)
- Highest elevation: 1,179 m (3,868 ft)
- Lowest elevation: 746 m (2,448 ft)
- Population (2023): 63
  - Density: 3.2/km^{2} (8.3/sq mi)
- Time zone: UTC+01:00 (CET)
  - Summer (DST): UTC+02:00 (CEST)
- INSEE/Postal code: 63087 /63420
- ^{1} French Land Register data, which excludes lakes, ponds, glaciers > 1 km^{2} (0.386 sq mi or 247 acres) and river estuaries.

La Chapelle-Marcousse (French pronunciation: [la ʃapɛl maʁkus]) is a commune in the Puy-de-Dôme department in Auvergne-Rhône-Alpes in central France.

== See also ==
- Communes of the Puy-de-Dôme department
