= Sauxillanges =

- Commune
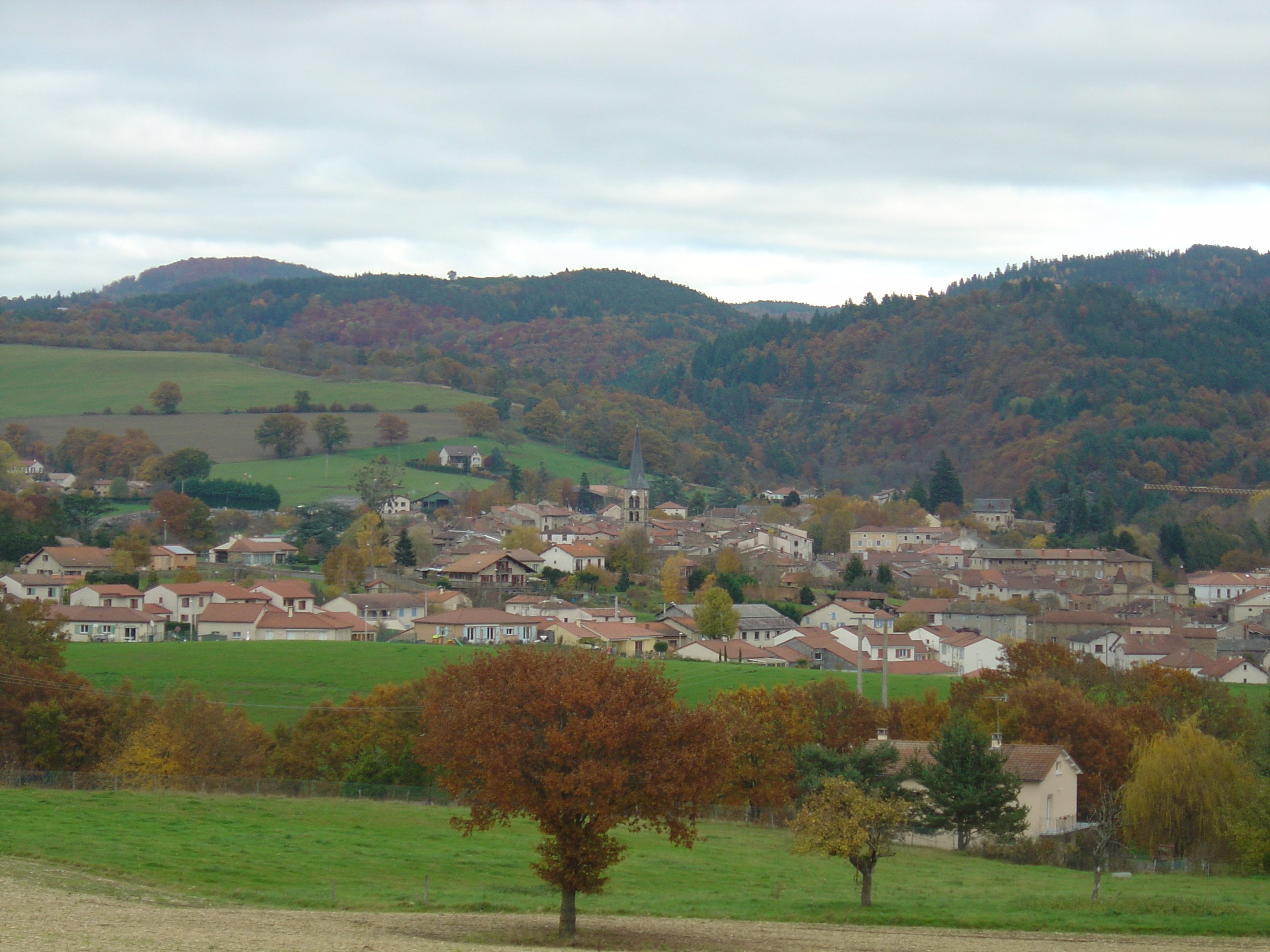
- A general view of Sauxillanges

- Coat of arms
- Location of Sauxillanges
- Location within France Location within Auvergne-Rhône-Alpes
- Coordinates: 45°33′04″N 3°22′19″E
- Country: France
- Region: Auvergne-Rhône-Alpes
- Department: Puy-de-Dôme
- Arrondissement: Issoire
- Canton: Brassac-les-Mines
- Intercommunality: Agglo Pays d'Issoire

Government
  - Mayor (2026–32): Vincent Challet
- Area^{1}: 24.90 km^{2} (9.61 sq mi)
- Elevation: 449 m (1,473 ft)
- Highest elevation: 667 m (2,188 ft)
- Lowest elevation: 418 m (1,371 ft)
- Population (2023): 1,316
  - Density: 52.85/km^{2} (136.9/sq mi)
- Time zone: UTC+01:00 (CET)
  - Summer (DST): UTC+02:00 (CEST)
- INSEE/Postal code: 63415 /63490
- ^{1} French Land Register data, which excludes lakes, ponds, glaciers > 1 km^{2} (0.386 sq mi or 247 acres) and river estuaries.

Sauxillanges (French pronunciation: [soksilɑ̃ʒ]) is a commune in the Puy-de-Dôme department in Auvergne in central France.

== Twin towns ==
Sauxillanges is twinned with:

- Fosdinovo, Italy, since 2003

== See also ==
- Communes of the Puy-de-Dôme department
