= La Tour-d'Auvergne =

La Tour-d'Auvergne La Tor d'Auvèrnhe (Occitan)
- Commune
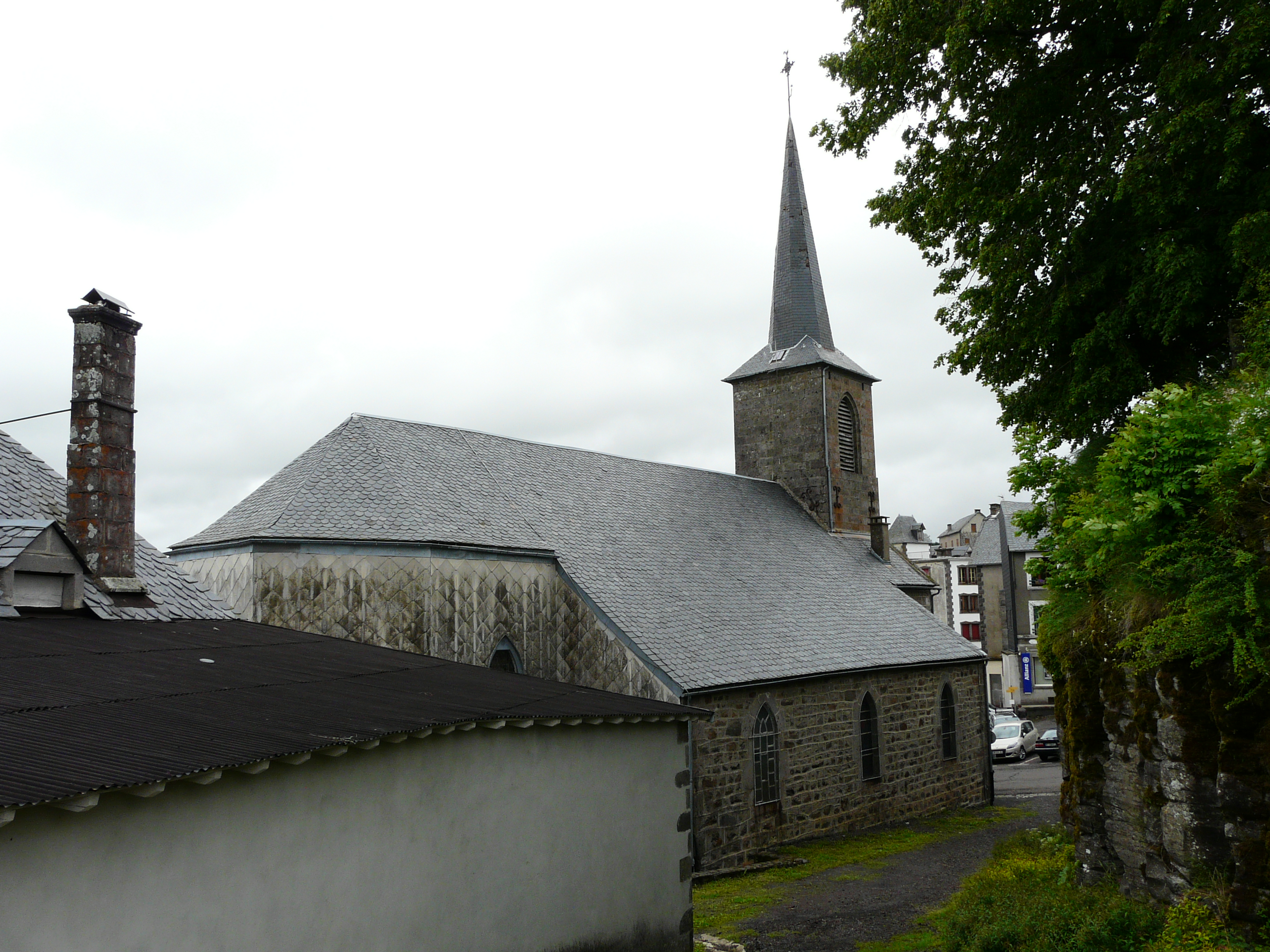
- The Saint-Louis church in La Tour-d'Auvergne

- Coat of arms
- Location of La Tour-d'Auvergne
- Location within France Location within Auvergne-Rhône-Alpes
- Coordinates: 45°32′N 2°41′E
- Country: France
- Region: Auvergne-Rhône-Alpes
- Department: Puy-de-Dôme
- Arrondissement: Issoire
- Canton: Le Sancy
- Intercommunality: Dômes Sancy Artense

Government
  - Mayor (2026–32): Yannick Tournadre
- Area^{1}: 48.29 km^{2} (18.64 sq mi)
- Elevation: 1,000 m (3,300 ft)
- Highest elevation: 1,691 m (5,548 ft)
- Lowest elevation: 719 m (2,359 ft)
- Population (2023): 640
  - Density: 13/km^{2} (34/sq mi)
- Time zone: UTC+01:00 (CET)
  - Summer (DST): UTC+02:00 (CEST)
- INSEE/Postal code: 63192 /63680
- ^{1} French Land Register data, which excludes lakes, ponds, glaciers > 1 km^{2} (0.386 sq mi or 247 acres) and river estuaries.

La Tour-d'Auvergne (French pronunciation: [la tuʁ dovɛʁɲ], before 1961: Latour, Occitan: La Tor d'Auvèrnhe) is a commune in the Puy-de-Dôme department in Auvergne in central France.

== Geography ==
The commune of La Tour-d'Auvergne is located on the west slope of the Massif du Sancy, at the southwestern extremity of the Puy-de-Dôme departement. It is 60 km (37 miles) away from Clermont-Ferrand and is crossed by the départementale 203 linking the A89 motorway and the départementale 2089 to Besse-et-Saint-Anastaise and Issoire. La Tour-d'Auvergne was the chef-lieu of the canton until 2015, and was composed of eight communes (La Tour-d'Auvergne, Bagnols, Puy-de-Dôme, Cros, Puy-de-Dôme, Trémouille-Saint-Loup, Chastreix, Saint-Donat, Picherande and Saint-Genès-Champespe). On the Artense plateau, which extends itself in between Cantal and the Tarentaine river south, the dam retention of Bort-les-Orgues, the Corrèze and the Avèse gorges west, La Bourboule and Mont-Dore glacier valley north and the massif du Sancy east, La Tour-d'Auvergne is an ancient village which holds its foundations on a basaltic piton, an old vestige of a volcanic flow of the massif du Sancy when it was a volcano, more than 250 000 years ago. Standing on a natural promontory, the village is located in between the Burande valleys and its tributary, the Burandou.

== See also ==
- Communes of the Puy-de-Dôme department
