= Creste =

- Part of Saint-Diéry
- Location of Creste
- Location within France Location within Auvergne-Rhône-Alpes
- Coordinates: 45°33′03″N 3°02′42″E
- Country: France
- Region: Auvergne-Rhône-Alpes
- Department: Puy-de-Dôme
- Arrondissement: Issoire
- Canton: Le Sancy
- Commune: Saint-Diéry
- Area^{1}: 4.36 km^{2} (1.68 sq mi)
- Elevation: 780 m (2,560 ft)
- Highest elevation: 874 m (2,867 ft)
- Lowest elevation: 549 m (1,801 ft)
- Population (2016): 50
  - Density: 11/km^{2} (30/sq mi)
- Time zone: UTC+01:00 (CET)
  - Summer (DST): UTC+02:00 (CEST)
- Postal code: 63320
- ^{1} French Land Register data, which excludes lakes, ponds, glaciers > 1 km^{2} (0.386 sq mi or 247 acres) and river estuaries.

Creste (French pronunciation: [kʁɛst]) is a former commune in the Puy-de-Dôme department in Auvergne-Rhône-Alpes in central France. On 1 January 2019, it was merged into the commune Saint-Diéry.

== See also ==
- Communes of the Puy-de-Dôme department
