= Avèze =

Avèze is the name of two communes in France:

- Avèze, Gard, in the Gard department
- Avèze, Puy-de-Dôme, in the Puy-de-Dôme department

== See also ==
- Avezé
