= Bagnols =

Bagnols may refer to various communes in France:

- Bagnols, Puy-de-Dôme
- Bagnols, Rhône
- Bagnols-en-Forêt, Var
- Bagnols-les-Bains, Lozère
- Bagnols-sur-Cèze, Gard
