= Labessette =

- Commune
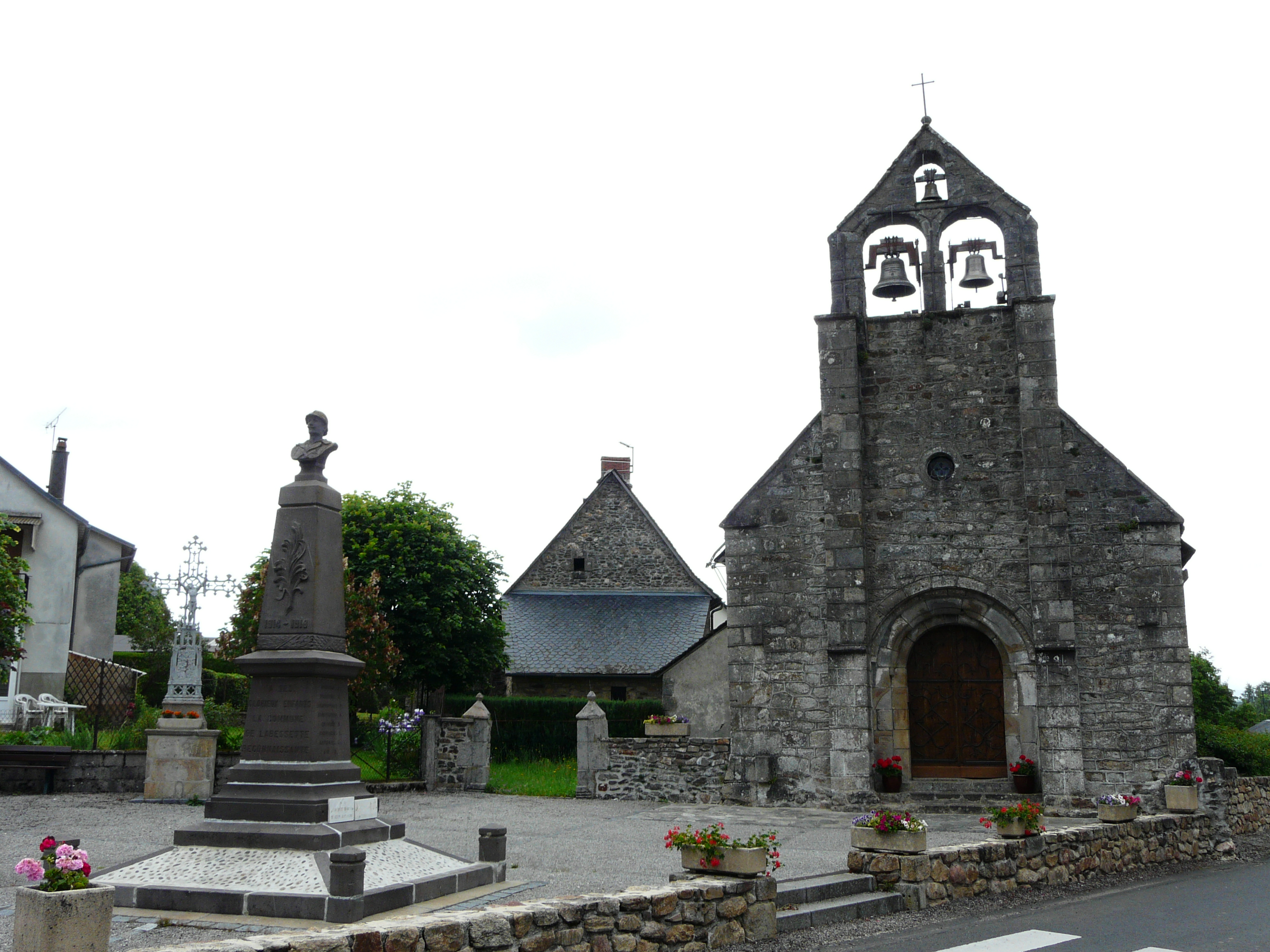
- The church in Labessette
- Location of Labessette
- Location within France Location within Auvergne-Rhône-Alpes
- Coordinates: 45°29′24″N 2°32′18″E
- Country: France
- Region: Auvergne-Rhône-Alpes
- Department: Puy-de-Dôme
- Arrondissement: Issoire
- Canton: Le Sancy

Government
  - Mayor (2026–32): Christian Vinagre-Rocca
- Area^{1}: 10.45 km^{2} (4.03 sq mi)
- Elevation: 760 m (2,490 ft)
- Highest elevation: 806 m (2,644 ft)
- Lowest elevation: 524 m (1,719 ft)
- Population (2023): 58
  - Density: 5.6/km^{2} (14/sq mi)
- Time zone: UTC+01:00 (CET)
  - Summer (DST): UTC+02:00 (CEST)
- INSEE/Postal code: 63183 /63690
- ^{1} French Land Register data, which excludes lakes, ponds, glaciers > 1 km^{2} (0.386 sq mi or 247 acres) and river estuaries.

Labessette is a commune in the Puy-de-Dôme department in Auvergne in central France.

== See also ==
- Communes of the Puy-de-Dôme department
