= Tourzel-Ronzières =

- Commune
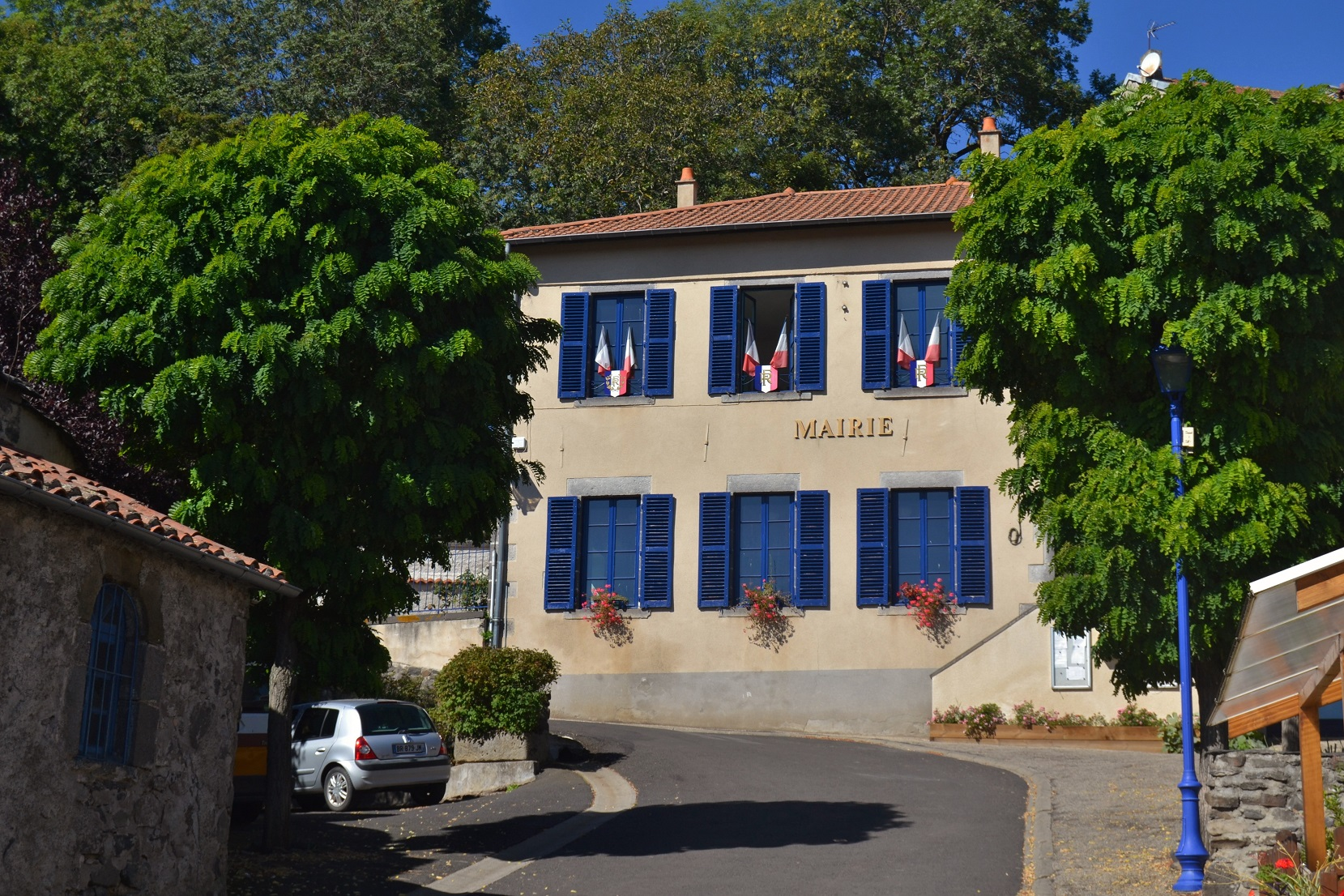
- The town hall in Tourzel-Ronzières
- Location of Tourzel-Ronzières
- Location within France Location within Auvergne-Rhône-Alpes
- Coordinates: 45°31′38″N 3°07′50″E
- Country: France
- Region: Auvergne-Rhône-Alpes
- Department: Puy-de-Dôme
- Arrondissement: Issoire
- Canton: Le Sancy
- Intercommunality: Agglo Pays d'Issoire

Government
  - Mayor (2026–32): Clément Foury
- Area^{1}: 11.77 km^{2} (4.54 sq mi)
- Elevation: 610 m (2,000 ft)
- Highest elevation: 940 m (3,080 ft)
- Lowest elevation: 488 m (1,601 ft)
- Population (2023): 200
  - Density: 17/km^{2} (44/sq mi)
- Time zone: UTC+01:00 (CET)
  - Summer (DST): UTC+02:00 (CEST)
- INSEE/Postal code: 63435 /63320
- ^{1} French Land Register data, which excludes lakes, ponds, glaciers > 1 km^{2} (0.386 sq mi or 247 acres) and river estuaries.

Tourzel-Ronzières (French pronunciation: [tuʁzɛl ʁɔ̃zjɛʁ]) is a commune in the Puy-de-Dôme department in Auvergne-Rhône-Alpes in central France.

== See also ==
- Communes of the Puy-de-Dôme department
