= Singles, Puy-de-Dôme =

Singles
- Commune
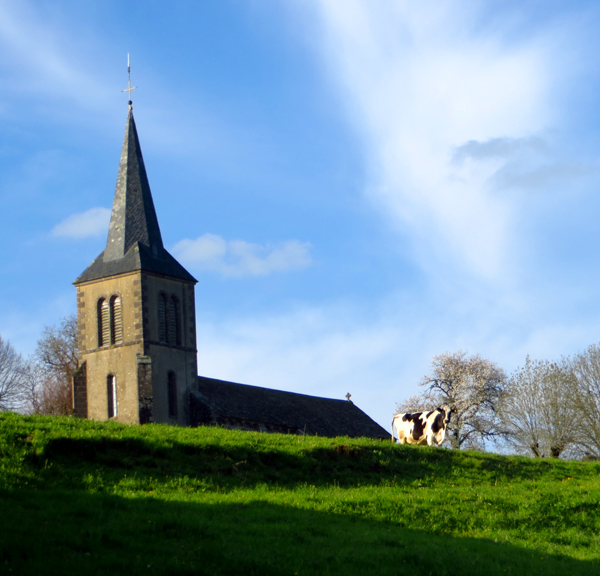
- The church in Singles
- Location of Singles
- Location within France Location within Auvergne-Rhône-Alpes
- Coordinates: 45°33′08″N 2°32′21″E
- Country: France
- Region: Auvergne-Rhône-Alpes
- Department: Puy-de-Dôme
- Arrondissement: Issoire
- Canton: Le Sancy
- Intercommunality: Dômes Sancy Artense

Government
  - Mayor (2026–32): Julien Gaydier
- Area^{1}: 20.43 km^{2} (7.89 sq mi)
- Elevation: 725 m (2,379 ft)
- Highest elevation: 830 m (2,720 ft)
- Lowest elevation: 534 m (1,752 ft)
- Population (2023): 171
  - Density: 8.37/km^{2} (21.7/sq mi)
- Time zone: UTC+01:00 (CET)
  - Summer (DST): UTC+02:00 (CEST)
- INSEE/Postal code: 63421 /63690
- ^{1} French Land Register data, which excludes lakes, ponds, glaciers > 1 km^{2} (0.386 sq mi or 247 acres) and river estuaries.

Singles (French pronunciation: [sɛ̃ɡl]) is a commune in the Puy-de-Dôme department in Auvergne in central France.

== See also ==
- Communes of the Puy-de-Dôme department
