= Saurier =

- Commune
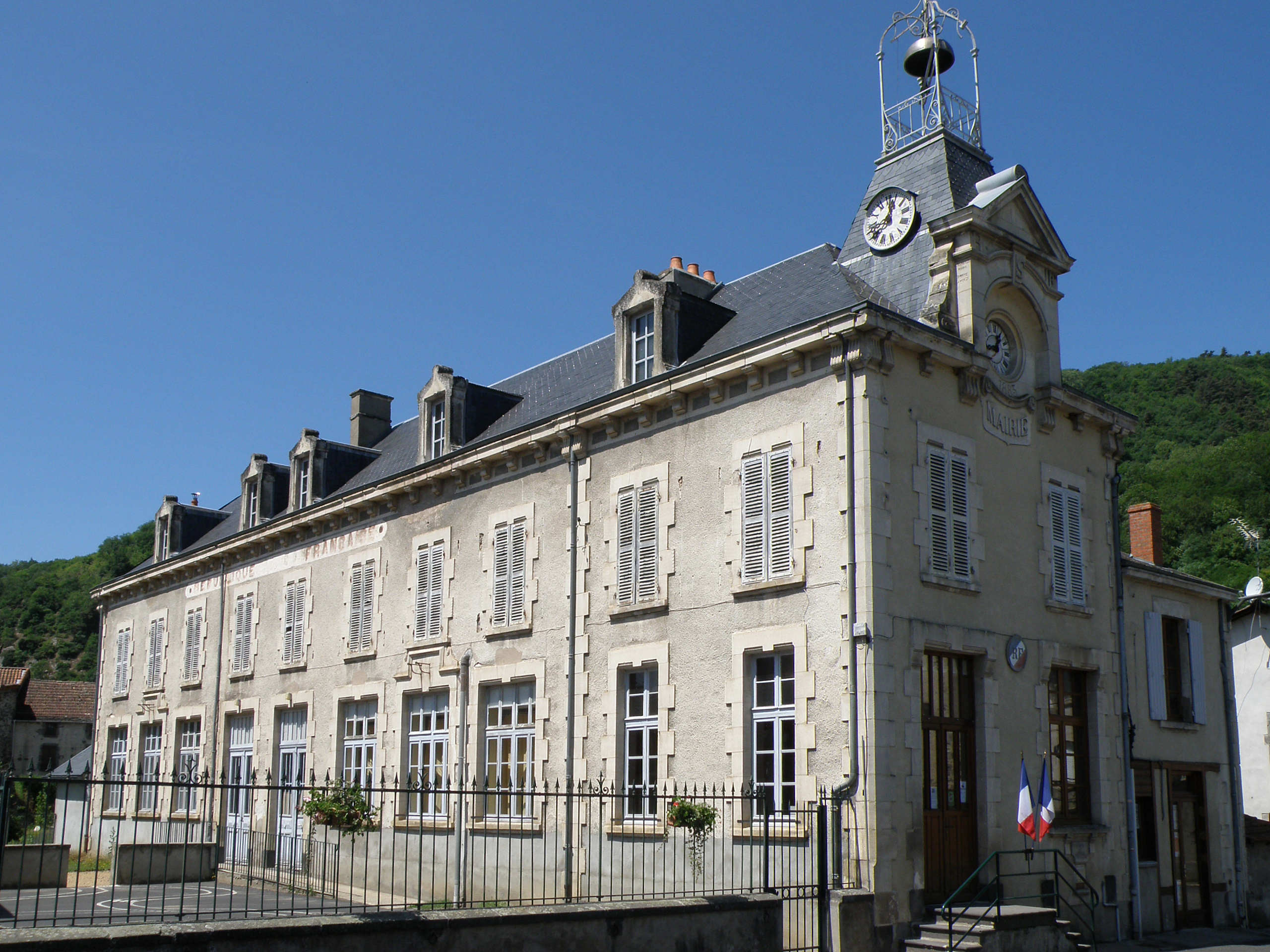
- The town hall in Saurier

- Coat of arms
- Location of Saurier
- Location within France Location within Auvergne-Rhône-Alpes
- Coordinates: 45°32′17″N 3°02′46″E
- Country: France
- Region: Auvergne-Rhône-Alpes
- Department: Puy-de-Dôme
- Arrondissement: Issoire
- Canton: Le Sancy
- Intercommunality: Agglo Pays d'Issoire

Government
  - Mayor (2026–32): Philippe Dubost
- Area^{1}: 8.36 km^{2} (3.23 sq mi)
- Elevation: 561 m (1,841 ft)
- Highest elevation: 925 m (3,035 ft)
- Lowest elevation: 529 m (1,736 ft)
- Population (2023): 245
  - Density: 29.3/km^{2} (75.9/sq mi)
- Time zone: UTC+01:00 (CET)
  - Summer (DST): UTC+02:00 (CEST)
- INSEE/Postal code: 63409 /63320
- ^{1} French Land Register data, which excludes lakes, ponds, glaciers > 1 km^{2} (0.386 sq mi or 247 acres) and river estuaries.

Saurier (French pronunciation: [soʁje]) is a commune in the Puy-de-Dôme department in Auvergne in central France.

== See also ==
- Communes of the Puy-de-Dôme department
