= Saint-Victor-la-Rivière =

- Commune
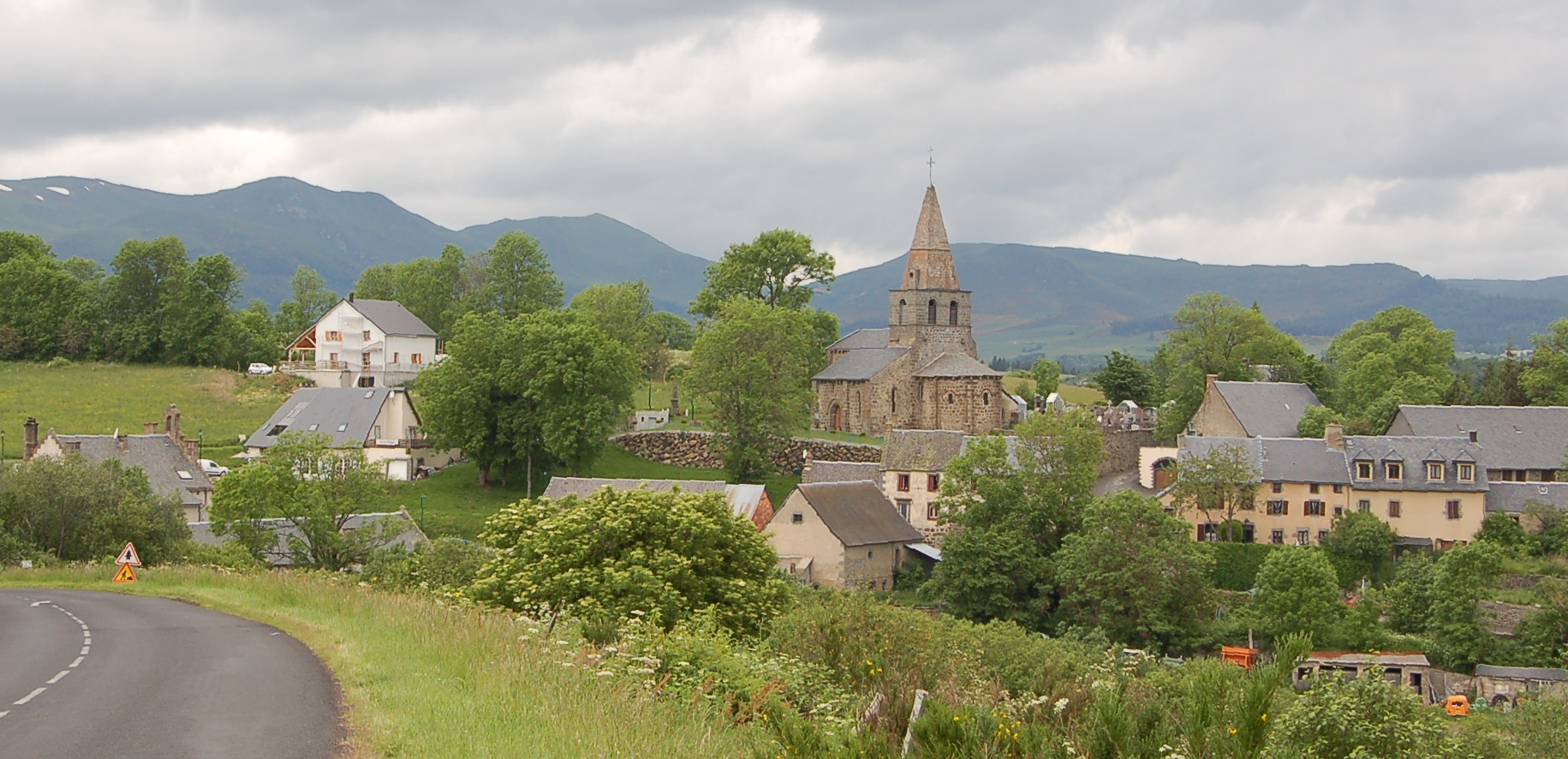
- View of the village and the church
- Location of Saint-Victor-la-Rivière
- Location within France Location within Auvergne-Rhône-Alpes
- Coordinates: 45°33′07″N 2°56′28″E
- Country: France
- Region: Auvergne-Rhône-Alpes
- Department: Puy-de-Dôme
- Arrondissement: Issoire
- Canton: Le Sancy

Government
  - Mayor (2026–32): François Gory
- Area^{1}: 18.89 km^{2} (7.29 sq mi)
- Elevation: 1,017 m (3,337 ft)
- Highest elevation: 1,276 m (4,186 ft)
- Lowest elevation: 780 m (2,560 ft)
- Population (2023): 239
  - Density: 12.7/km^{2} (32.8/sq mi)
- Time zone: UTC+01:00 (CET)
  - Summer (DST): UTC+02:00 (CEST)
- INSEE/Postal code: 63401 /63790
- ^{1} French Land Register data, which excludes lakes, ponds, glaciers > 1 km^{2} (0.386 sq mi or 247 acres) and river estuaries.

Saint-Victor-la-Rivière (French pronunciation: [sɛ̃ viktɔʁ la ʁivjɛʁ]) is a commune in the Puy-de-Dôme department in Auvergne in central France.

== See also ==
- Communes of the Puy-de-Dôme department
