= Saint-Diéry =

- Commune
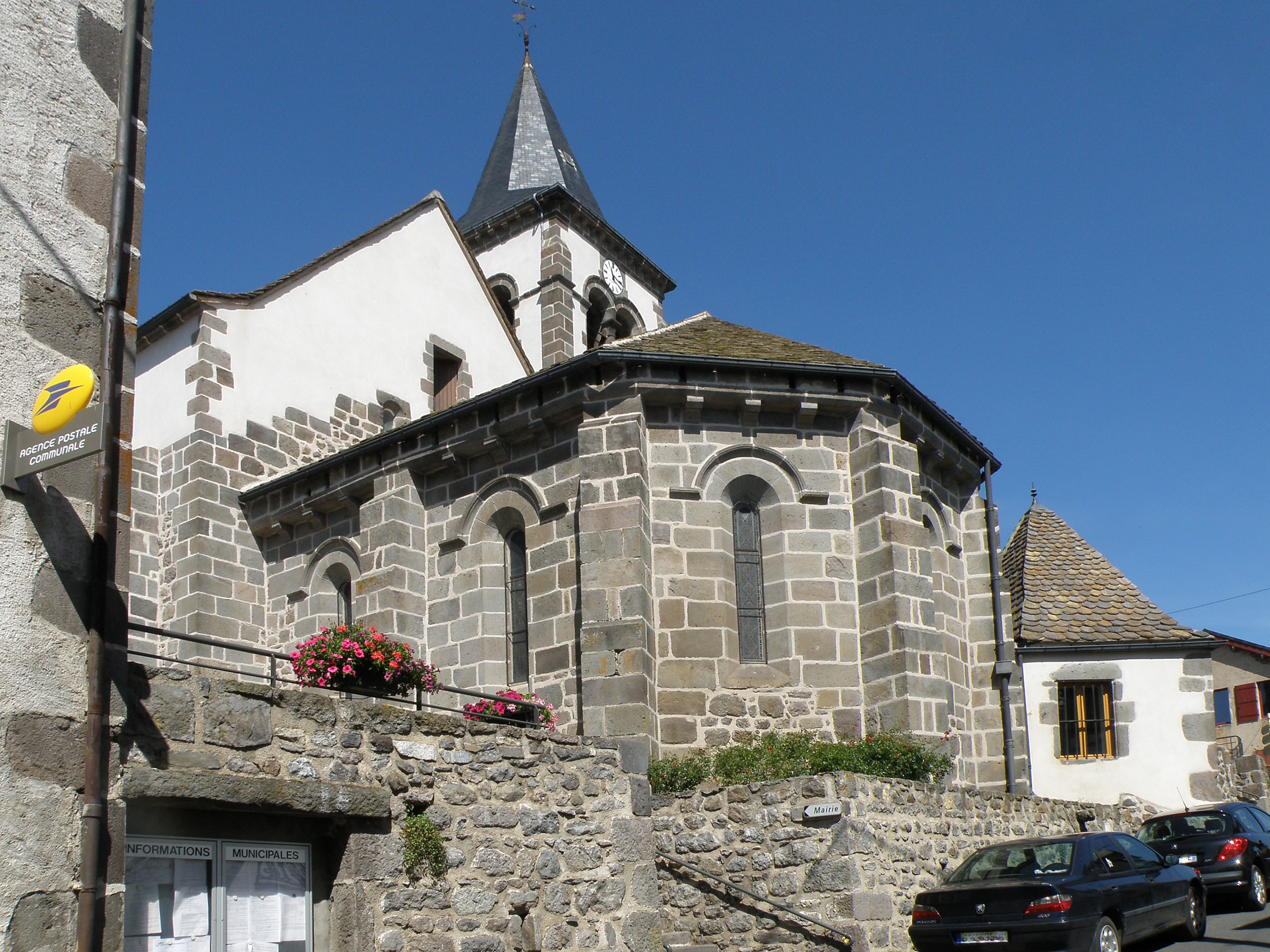
- The church in Saint-Diéry
- Location of Saint-Diéry
- Location within France Location within Auvergne-Rhône-Alpes
- Coordinates: 45°32′42″N 3°01′12″E
- Country: France
- Region: Auvergne-Rhône-Alpes
- Department: Puy-de-Dôme
- Arrondissement: Issoire
- Canton: Le Sancy
- Intercommunality: Massif du Sancy
- Area^{1}: 24.11 km^{2} (9.31 sq mi)
- Elevation: 680 m (2,230 ft)
- Highest elevation: 1,036 m (3,399 ft)
- Lowest elevation: 549 m (1,801 ft)
- Population (2023): 546
  - Density: 22.6/km^{2} (58.7/sq mi)
- Time zone: UTC+01:00 (CET)
  - Summer (DST): UTC+02:00 (CEST)
- INSEE/Postal code: 63335 /63320
- ^{1} French Land Register data, which excludes lakes, ponds, glaciers > 1 km^{2} (0.386 sq mi or 247 acres) and river estuaries.

Saint-Diéry (French pronunciation: [sɛ̃ djeʁi]; Occitan: Sent Desidri) is a commune in the Puy-de-Dôme department in Auvergne in central France. On 1 January 2019, the former commune Creste was merged into Saint-Diéry.

== See also ==
- Communes of the Puy-de-Dôme department
