= Solignat =

- Commune
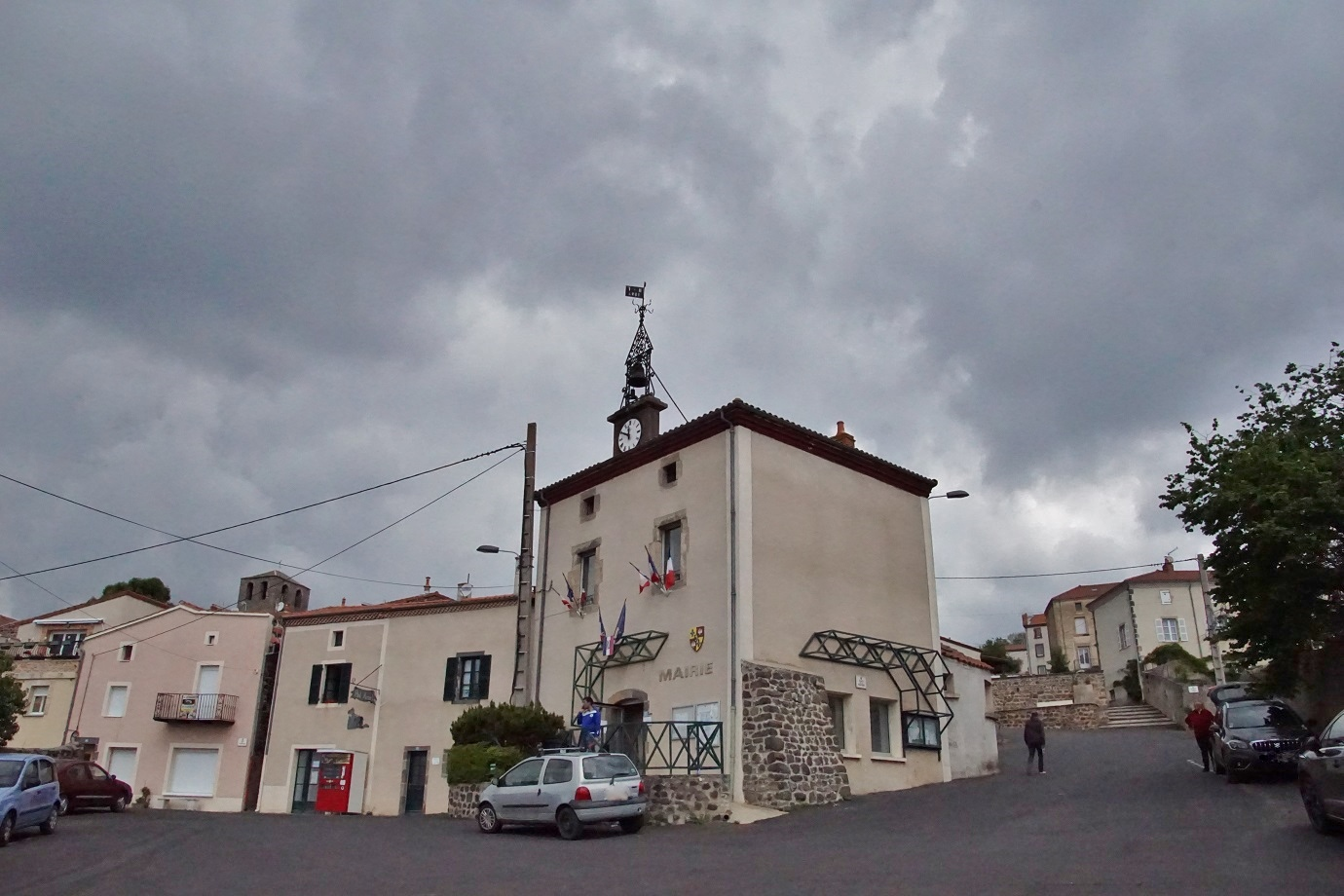
- Solignat Town hall

- Coat of arms
- Location of Solignat
- Location within France Location within Auvergne-Rhône-Alpes
- Coordinates: 45°30′58″N 3°10′19″E
- Country: France
- Region: Auvergne-Rhône-Alpes
- Department: Puy-de-Dôme
- Arrondissement: Issoire
- Canton: Le Sancy
- Intercommunality: Agglo Pays d'Issoire

Government
  - Mayor (2026–32): Philippe Mallet
- Area^{1}: 11.07 km^{2} (4.27 sq mi)
- Elevation: 600 m (2,000 ft)
- Highest elevation: 855 m (2,805 ft)
- Lowest elevation: 410 m (1,350 ft)
- Population (2023): 510
  - Density: 46/km^{2} (120/sq mi)
- Time zone: UTC+01:00 (CET)
  - Summer (DST): UTC+02:00 (CEST)
- INSEE/Postal code: 63422 /63500
- ^{1} French Land Register data, which excludes lakes, ponds, glaciers > 1 km^{2} (0.386 sq mi or 247 acres) and river estuaries.

Solignat (French pronunciation: [sɔliɲa]; Auvergnat: Solenhac) is a commune in the Puy-de-Dôme department in the Auvergne-Rhône-Alpes region in central France.

Near Solignat lies Puy D'Ysson, a mountain formed by ancient volcanic pipe that reaches 2,808 feet in elevation. The summit of Puy D'Ysson offers a panoramic view of Puy de Sancy, the Chaîne des Puys (including Puy de Dôme), the plateau of Cézallier, and the Livradois-Forez mountain range.

== See also ==
- Communes of the Puy-de-Dôme department
