= Saint-Floret =

- Commune
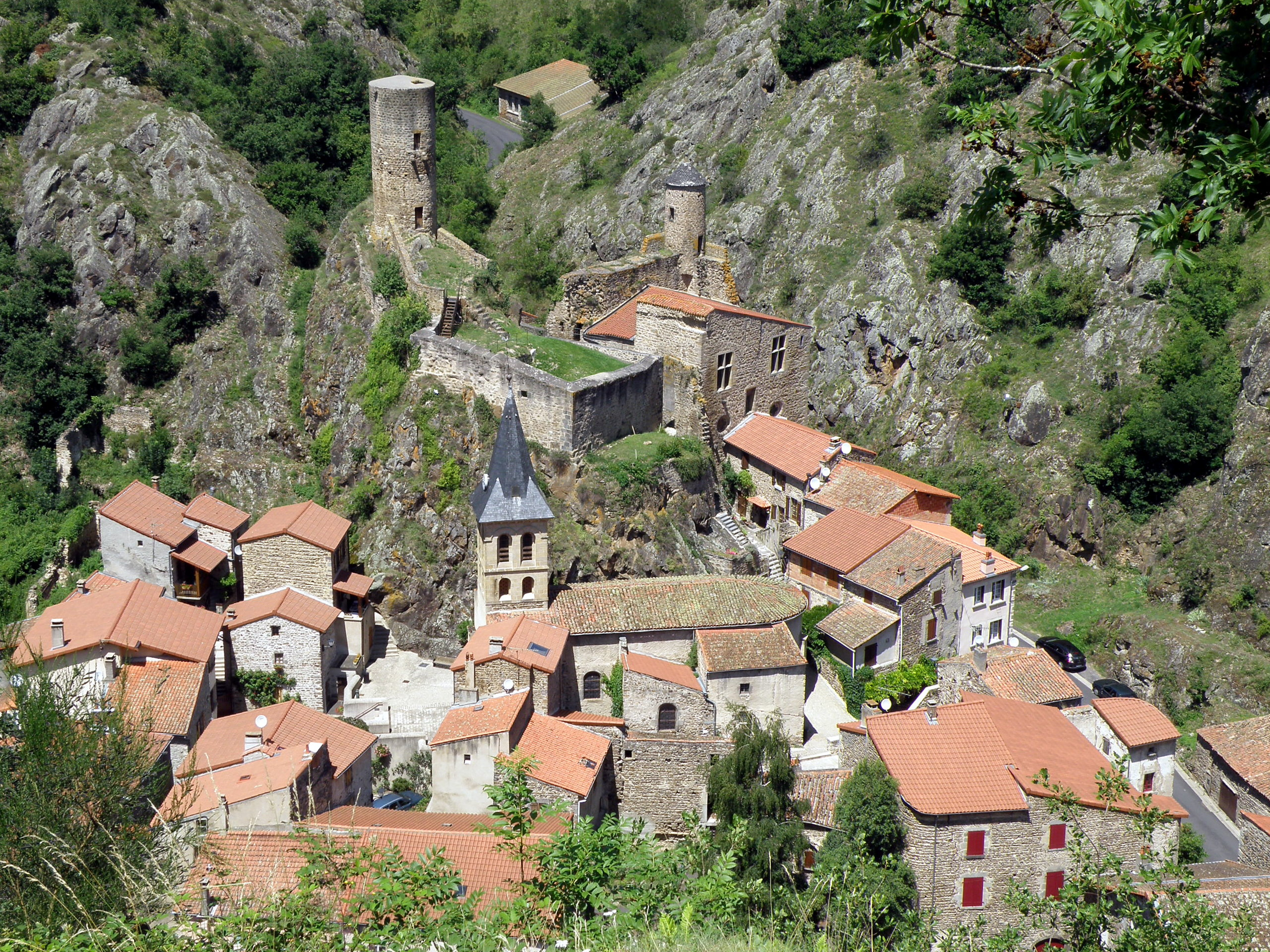
- The town of Saint-Floret

- Coat of arms
- Location of Saint-Floret
- Location within France Location within Auvergne-Rhône-Alpes
- Coordinates: 45°33′03″N 3°06′21″E
- Country: France
- Region: Auvergne-Rhône-Alpes
- Department: Puy-de-Dôme
- Arrondissement: Issoire
- Canton: Le Sancy
- Intercommunality: Agglo Pays d'Issoire

Government
  - Mayor (2026–32): Maguy Lagarde
- Area^{1}: 12.16 km^{2} (4.70 sq mi)
- Elevation: 503 m (1,650 ft)
- Highest elevation: 929 m (3,048 ft)
- Lowest elevation: 476 m (1,562 ft)
- Population (2023): 243
  - Density: 20.0/km^{2} (51.8/sq mi)
- Time zone: UTC+01:00 (CET)
  - Summer (DST): UTC+02:00 (CEST)
- INSEE/Postal code: 63342 /63320
- ^{1} French Land Register data, which excludes lakes, ponds, glaciers > 1 km^{2} (0.386 sq mi or 247 acres) and river estuaries.

Saint-Floret (French pronunciation: [sɛ̃ flɔʁɛ]; Occitan: Sent Floret) is a commune in the Puy-de-Dôme department in Auvergne-Rhône-Alpes in central France.

== History ==
Saint-Floret is a place of passage on the Way of St. James, a leading Catholic pilgrimage route originated in the 9th century.

During the revolutionary period of the National Convention (1792-1795), the commune took the name Roche-la-Couze.

== Population ==
Historical population
| Year | Pop. | ±% p.a. |
|---|---|---|
| 1968 | 276 | — |
| 1975 | 251 | −1.35% |
| 1982 | 219 | −1.93% |
| 1990 | 259 | +2.12% |
| 1999 | 248 | −0.48% |
| 2007 | 266 | +0.88% |
| 2012 | 269 | +0.22% |
| 2017 | 251 | −1.38% |
| 2023 | 243 | −0.54% |
Source: INSEE

== See also ==
- Communes of the Puy-de-Dôme department
