= Tauves =

- Commune
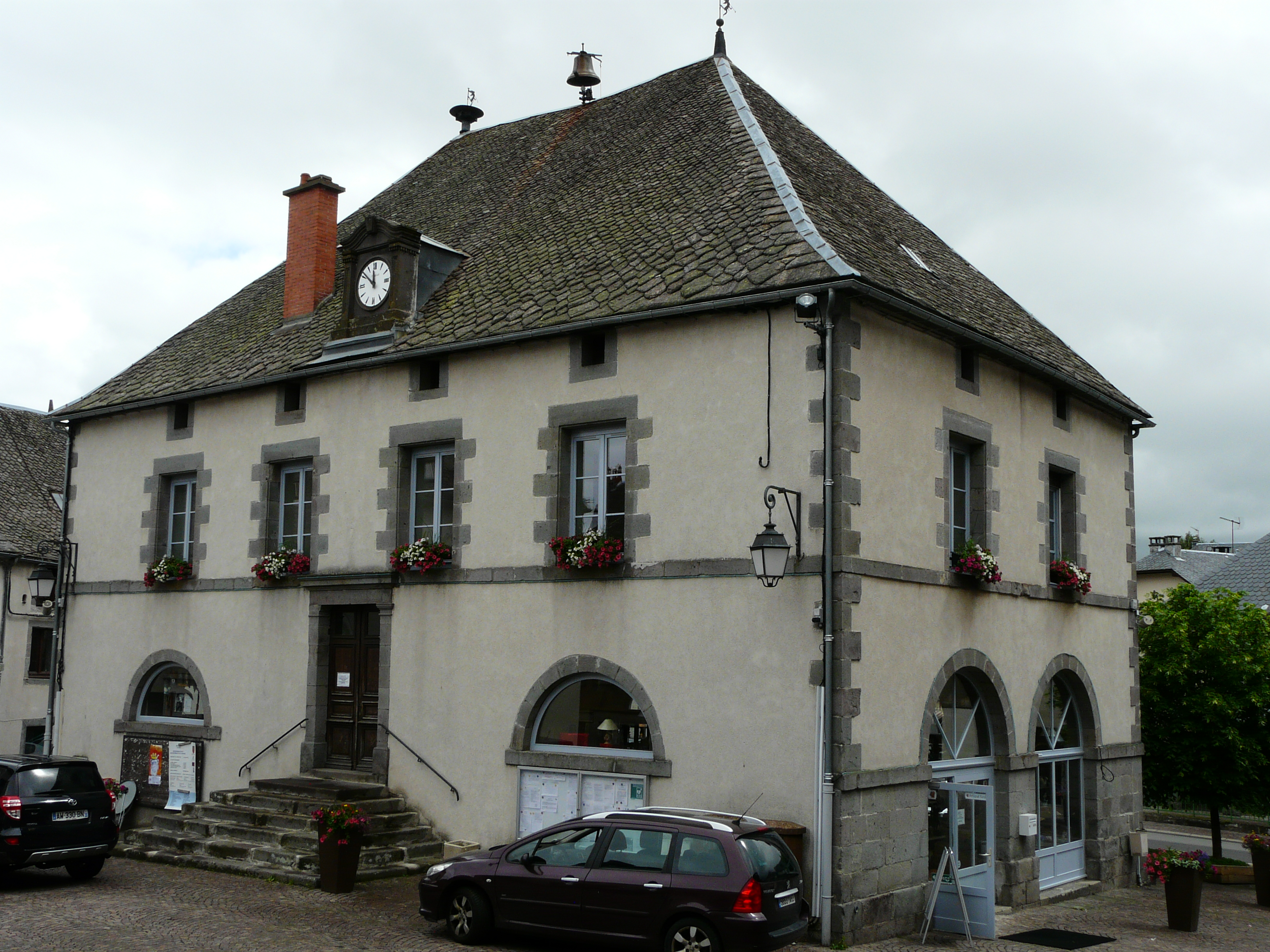
- The town hall in Tauves

- Coat of arms
- Location of Tauves
- Location within France Location within Auvergne-Rhône-Alpes
- Coordinates: 45°33′39″N 2°37′27″E
- Country: France
- Region: Auvergne-Rhône-Alpes
- Department: Puy-de-Dôme
- Arrondissement: Issoire
- Canton: Le Sancy
- Intercommunality: Dômes Sancy Artense

Government
  - Mayor (2026–32): Christophe Serre
- Area^{1}: 33.95 km^{2} (13.11 sq mi)
- Elevation: 840 m (2,760 ft)
- Highest elevation: 1,072 m (3,517 ft)
- Lowest elevation: 636 m (2,087 ft)
- Population (2023): 684
  - Density: 20.1/km^{2} (52.2/sq mi)
- Time zone: UTC+01:00 (CET)
  - Summer (DST): UTC+02:00 (CEST)
- INSEE/Postal code: 63426 /63690
- ^{1} French Land Register data, which excludes lakes, ponds, glaciers > 1 km^{2} (0.386 sq mi or 247 acres) and river estuaries.

Tauves (French pronunciation: [tov]) is a commune in the Puy-de-Dôme department in Auvergne in central France.

== Twin towns ==
Tauves is twinned with Castiglione di Sicilia, Italy.

== See also ==
- Communes of the Puy-de-Dôme department
