= Verrières, Puy-de-Dôme =

Verrières
- Commune
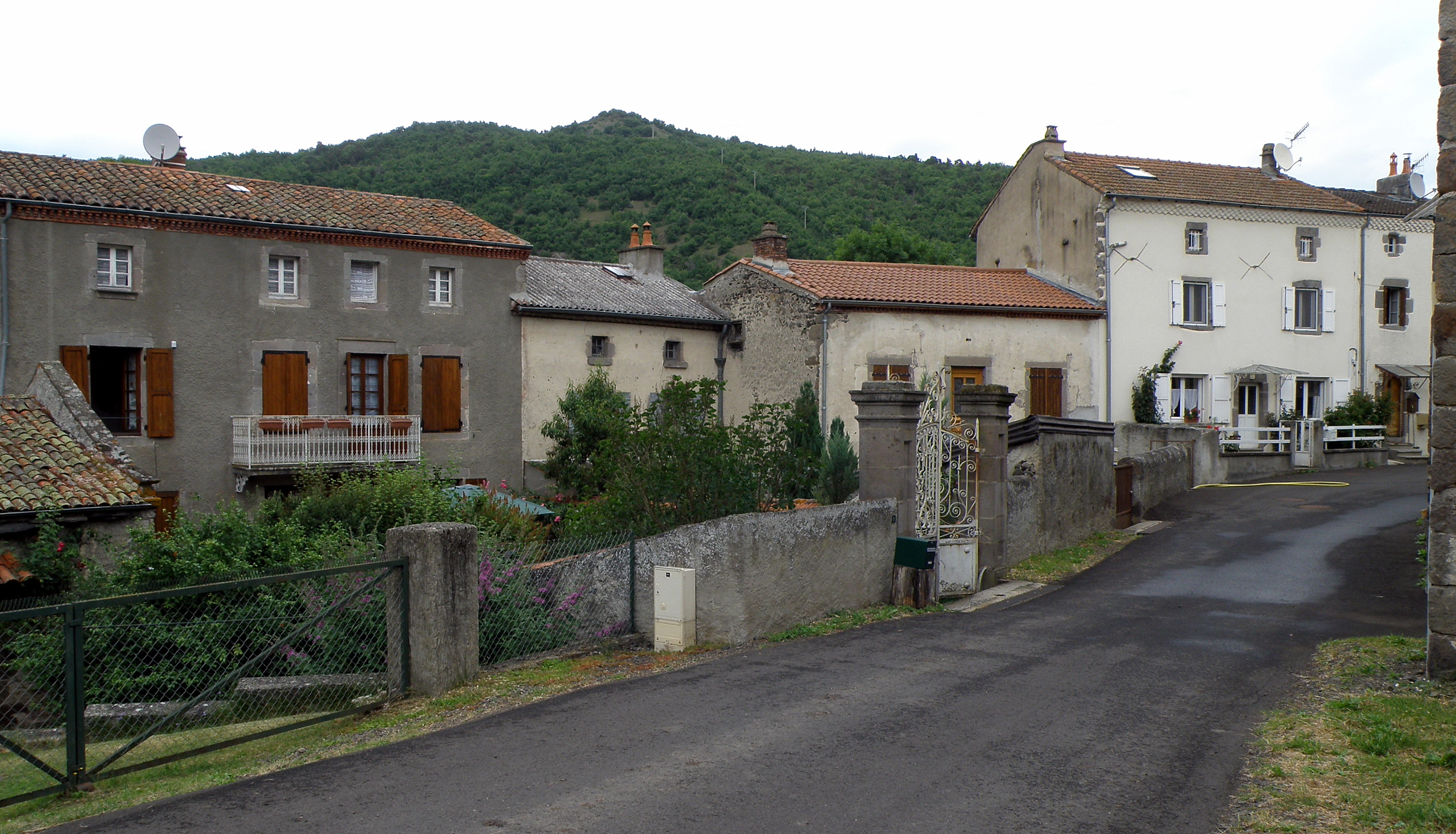
- The centre of Verrières
- Location of Verrières
- Location within France Location within Auvergne-Rhône-Alpes
- Coordinates: 45°34′19″N 3°02′14″E
- Country: France
- Region: Auvergne-Rhône-Alpes
- Department: Puy-de-Dôme
- Arrondissement: Issoire
- Canton: Le Sancy
- Intercommunality: Agglo Pays d'Issoire

Government
  - Mayor (2020–2026): Jean-Pierre Chassang
- Area^{1}: 3.28 km^{2} (1.27 sq mi)
- Elevation: 630 m (2,070 ft)
- Highest elevation: 774 m (2,539 ft)
- Lowest elevation: 560 m (1,840 ft)
- Population (2023): 74
  - Density: 23/km^{2} (58/sq mi)
- Time zone: UTC+01:00 (CET)
  - Summer (DST): UTC+02:00 (CEST)
- INSEE/Postal code: 63452 /63320
- ^{1} French Land Register data, which excludes lakes, ponds, glaciers > 1 km^{2} (0.386 sq mi or 247 acres) and river estuaries.

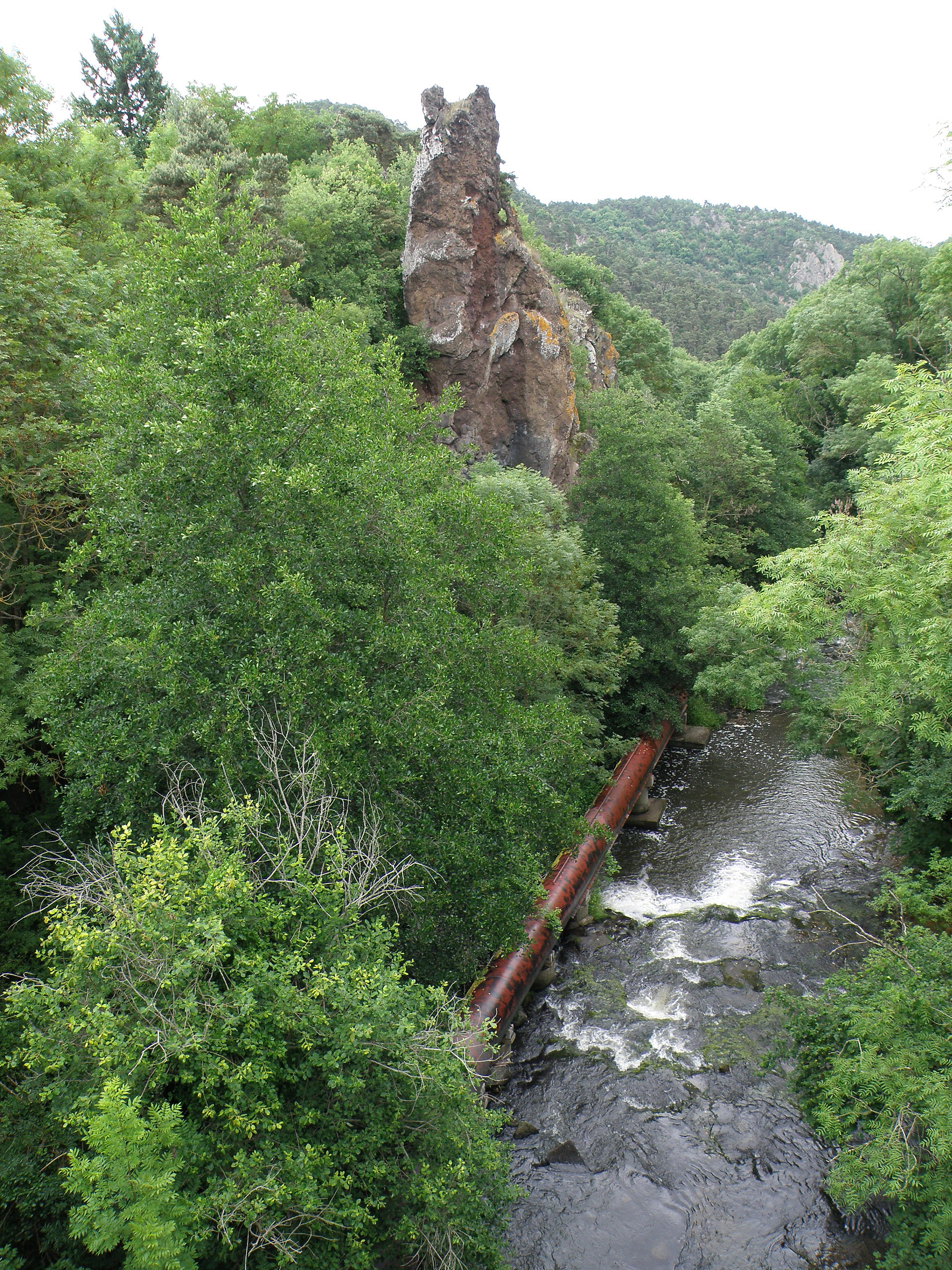
The needle of the Roche Longue

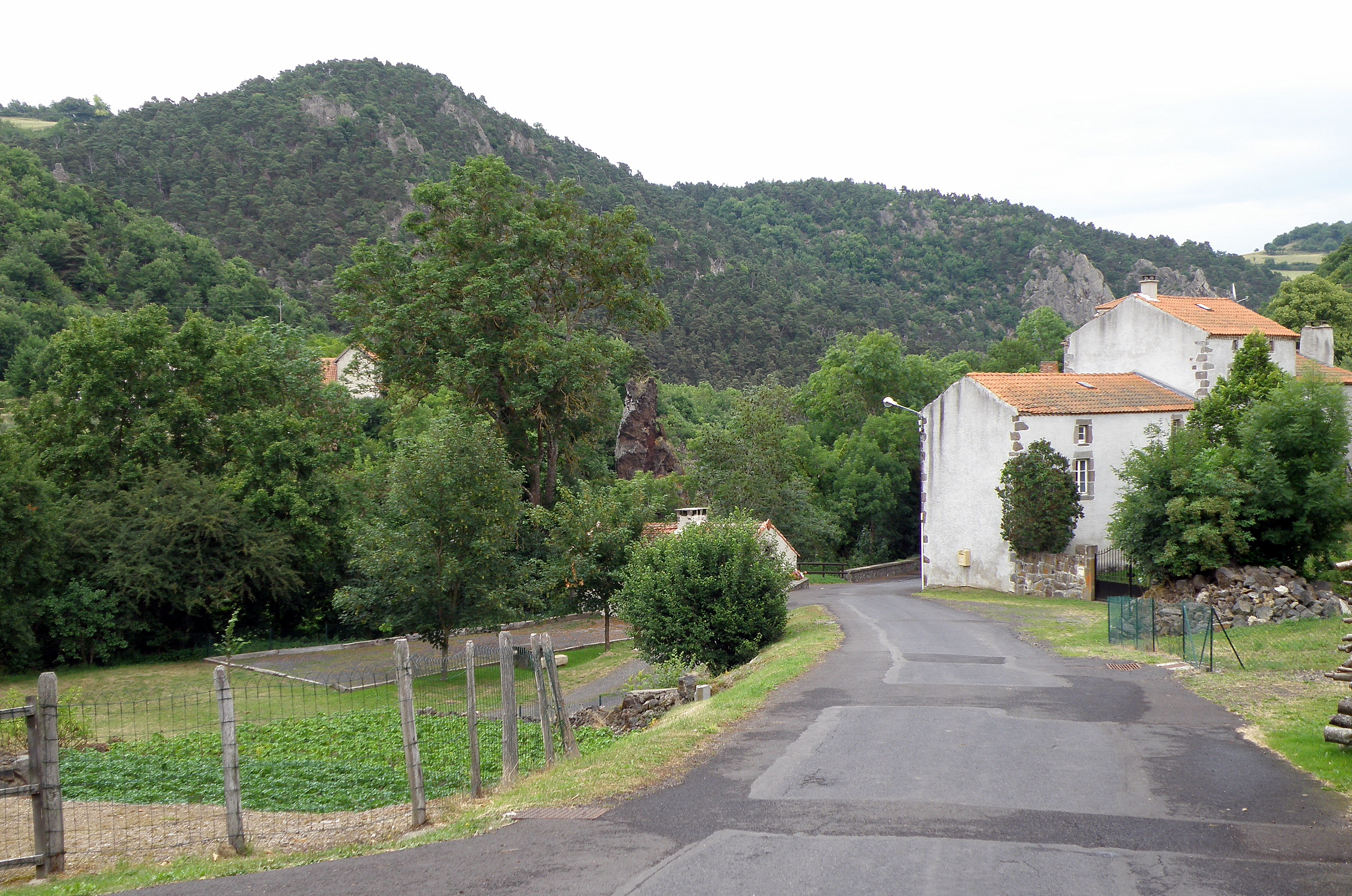

Verrières (French pronunciation: [vɛʁjɛʁ]; Occitan: Veirièras) is a commune in the Puy-de-Dôme department in Auvergne in central France.

In 2024, Verrières was categorized as a rural commune with dispersed housing, according to the seven-level communal density grid defined by INSEE in 2022. It is located outside an urban unit. The commune is part of the Clermont-Ferrand attraction area, which is a suburban commune. This area, which includes 209 communes, is categorized in areas of 200,000 to less than 700,000 inhabitants.

== See also ==
- Communes of the Puy-de-Dôme department

== Notes ==
1. The concept of city catchment area replaced the old concept of urban area in October 2020, to allow for consistent comparisons with other countries of the European Union.
