= Courgoul =

- Commune
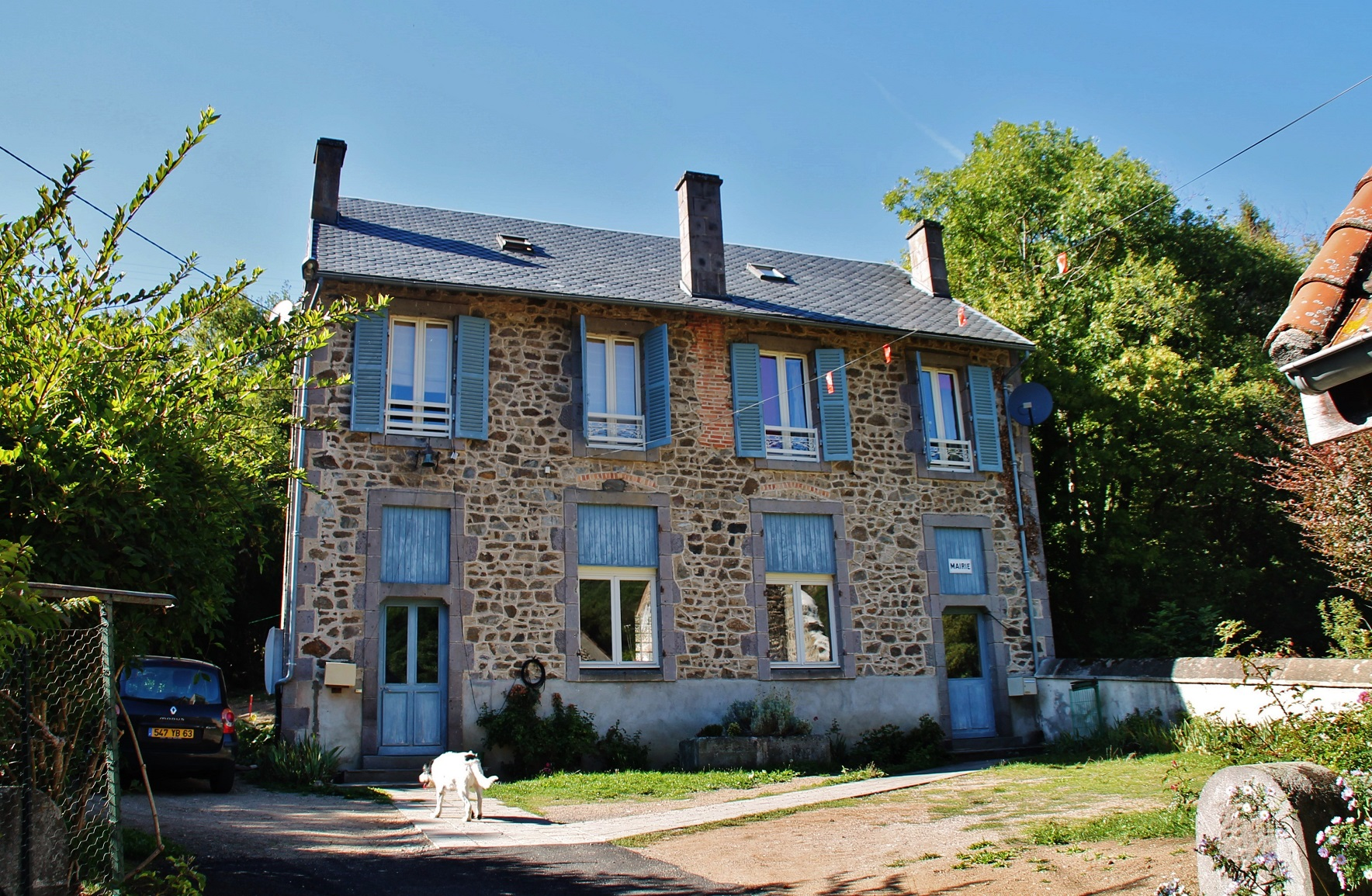
- The town hall in Courgoul

- Coat of arms
- Location of Courgoul
- Location within France Location within Auvergne-Rhône-Alpes
- Coordinates: 45°30′28″N 3°01′58″E
- Country: France
- Region: Auvergne-Rhône-Alpes
- Department: Puy-de-Dôme
- Arrondissement: Issoire
- Canton: Le Sancy
- Intercommunality: Agglo Pays d'Issoire

Government
  - Mayor (2026–32): Sébastien Jaffeux
- Area^{1}: 8.44 km^{2} (3.26 sq mi)
- Highest elevation: 1,033 m (3,389 ft)
- Lowest elevation: 569 m (1,867 ft)
- Population (2023): 62
  - Density: 7.3/km^{2} (19/sq mi)
- Time zone: UTC+01:00 (CET)
  - Summer (DST): UTC+02:00 (CEST)
- INSEE/Postal code: 63122 /63320
- ^{1} French Land Register data, which excludes lakes, ponds, glaciers > 1 km^{2} (0.386 sq mi or 247 acres) and river estuaries.

Courgoul (French pronunciation: [kuʁɡul]; Occitan: Corgol) is a commune in the Puy-de-Dôme department in Auvergne-Rhône-Alpes in central France.

== See also ==
- Communes of the Puy-de-Dôme department
