= Murat-le-Quaire =

- Commune
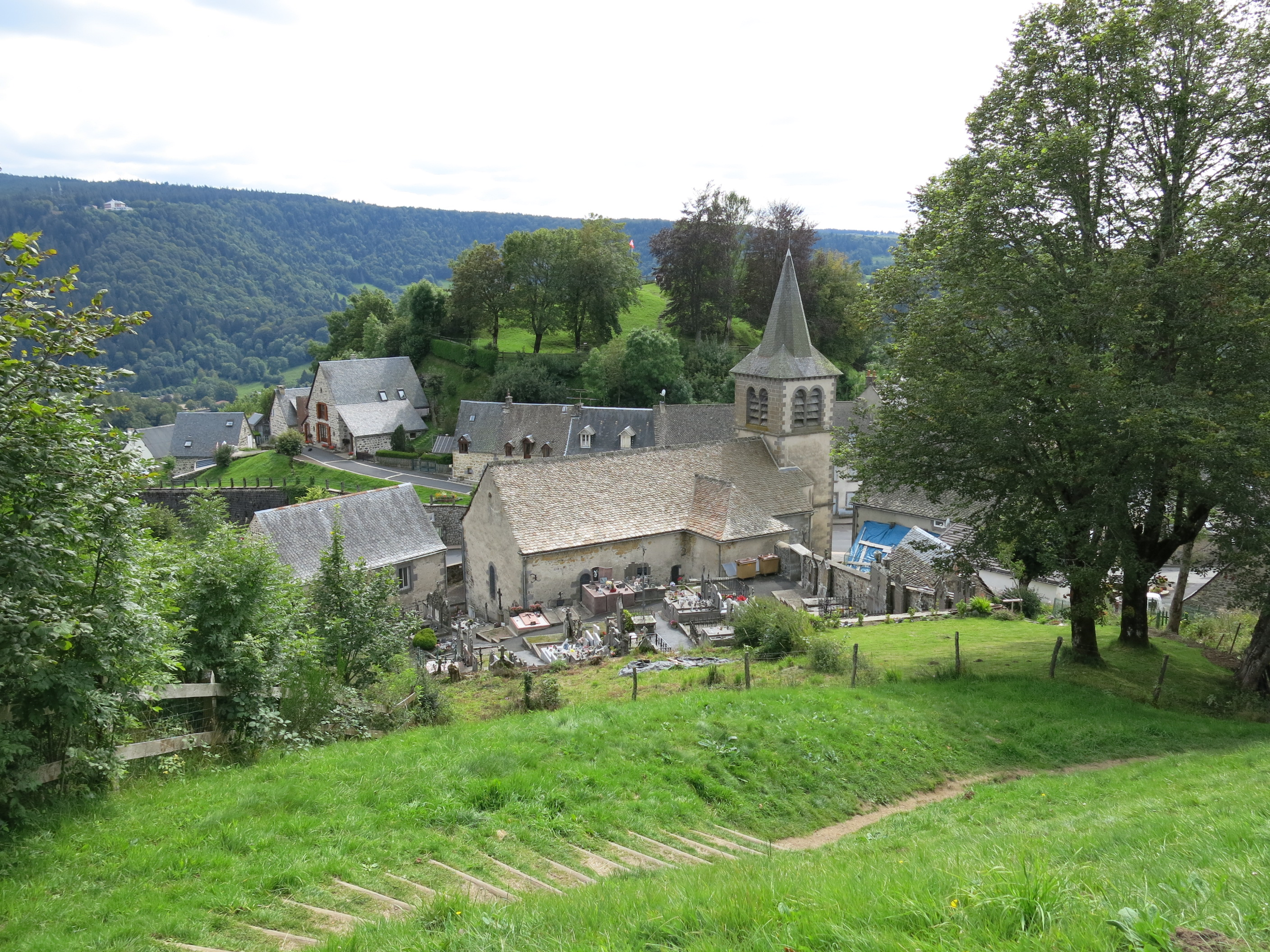
- The church in Murat-le-Quaire

- Coat of arms
- Location of Murat-le-Quaire
- Location within France Location within Auvergne-Rhône-Alpes
- Coordinates: 45°35′53″N 2°44′06″E
- Country: France
- Region: Auvergne-Rhône-Alpes
- Department: Puy-de-Dôme
- Arrondissement: Issoire
- Canton: Le Sancy

Government
  - Mayor (2026–32): Jean-François Cassier
- Area^{1}: 11.64 km^{2} (4.49 sq mi)
- Elevation: 1,050 m (3,440 ft)
- Highest elevation: 1,508 m (4,948 ft)
- Lowest elevation: 836 m (2,743 ft)
- Population (2023): 484
  - Density: 41.6/km^{2} (108/sq mi)
- Time zone: UTC+01:00 (CET)
  - Summer (DST): UTC+02:00 (CEST)
- INSEE/Postal code: 63246 /63150
- ^{1} French Land Register data, which excludes lakes, ponds, glaciers > 1 km^{2} (0.386 sq mi or 247 acres) and river estuaries.

Murat-le-Quaire (French pronunciation: [myʁa lə kɛʁ]) is a commune in the Puy-de-Dôme department in Auvergne in central France.

== See also ==
- Communes of the Puy-de-Dôme department
