= Valbeleix =

- Commune
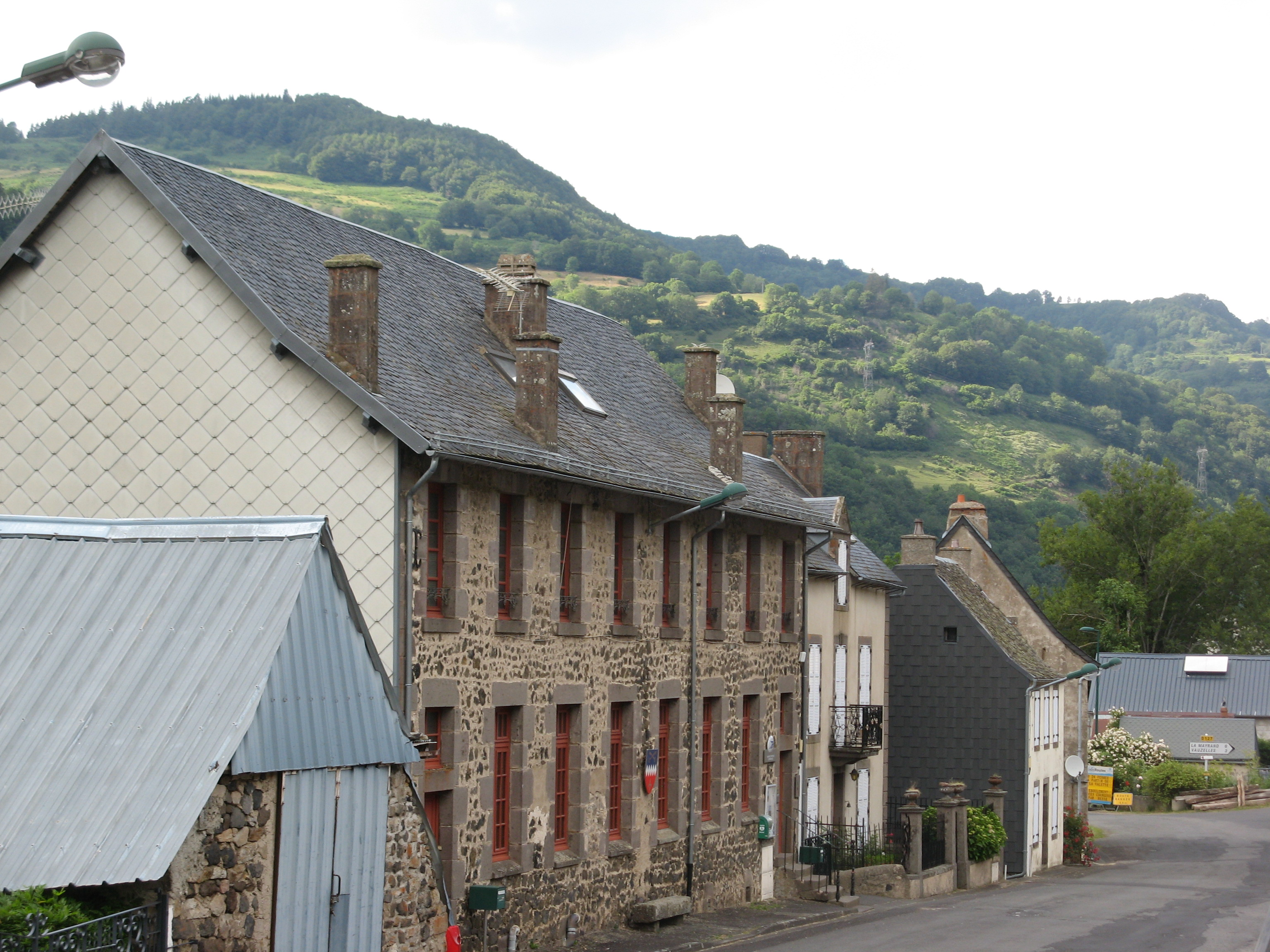
- The town hall in Valbeleix

- Coat of arms
- Location of Valbeleix
- Location within France Location within Auvergne-Rhône-Alpes
- Coordinates: 45°28′11″N 2°59′17″E
- Country: France
- Region: Auvergne-Rhône-Alpes
- Department: Puy-de-Dôme
- Arrondissement: Issoire
- Canton: Le Sancy

Government
  - Mayor (2026–32): Elsa Lancelle
- Area^{1}: 22.41 km^{2} (8.65 sq mi)
- Elevation: 800 m (2,600 ft)
- Highest elevation: 1,198 m (3,930 ft)
- Lowest elevation: 670 m (2,200 ft)
- Population (2023): 149
  - Density: 6.65/km^{2} (17.2/sq mi)
- Time zone: UTC+01:00 (CET)
  - Summer (DST): UTC+02:00 (CEST)
- INSEE/Postal code: 63440 /63610
- ^{1} French Land Register data, which excludes lakes, ponds, glaciers > 1 km^{2} (0.386 sq mi or 247 acres) and river estuaries.

Valbeleix (French pronunciation: [valbəlɛ]) is a commune in the Puy-de-Dôme department in Auvergne in central France.

== See also ==
- Communes of the Puy-de-Dôme department
