= Espinchal =

- Commune
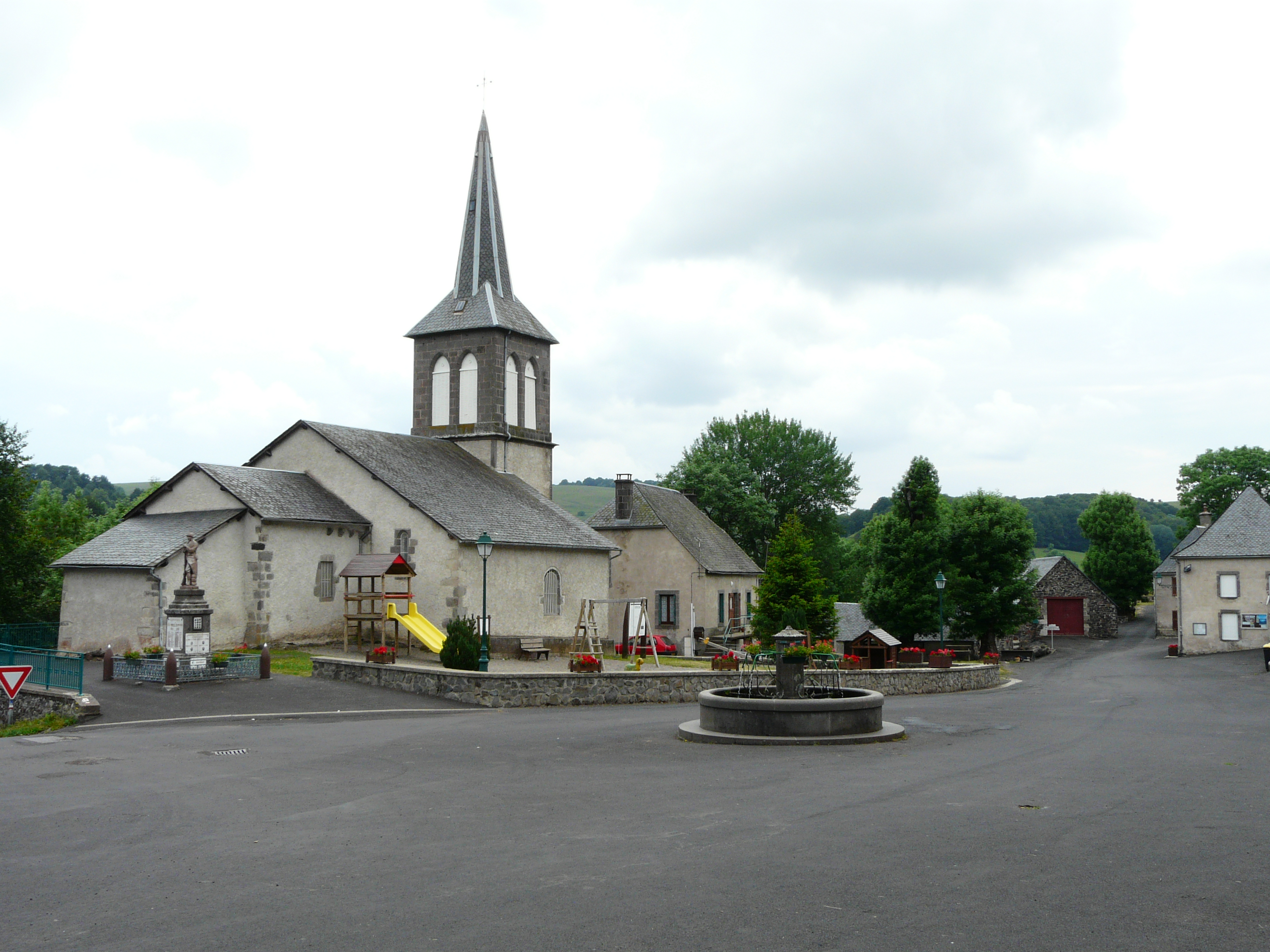
- The church in Espinchal

- Coat of arms
- Location of Espinchal
- Location within France Location within Auvergne-Rhône-Alpes
- Coordinates: 45°23′42″N 2°52′55″E
- Country: France
- Region: Auvergne-Rhône-Alpes
- Department: Puy-de-Dôme
- Arrondissement: Issoire
- Canton: Le Sancy

Government
  - Mayor (2026–32): Jean-Luc Chanier
- Area^{1}: 8.85 km^{2} (3.42 sq mi)
- Elevation: 1,050 m (3,440 ft)
- Highest elevation: 1,230 m (4,040 ft)
- Lowest elevation: 980 m (3,220 ft)
- Population (2023): 72
  - Density: 8.1/km^{2} (21/sq mi)
- Time zone: UTC+01:00 (CET)
  - Summer (DST): UTC+02:00 (CEST)
- INSEE/Postal code: 63153 /63850
- ^{1} French Land Register data, which excludes lakes, ponds, glaciers > 1 km^{2} (0.386 sq mi or 247 acres) and river estuaries.

Espinchal (French pronunciation: [ɛspɛ̃ʃal]) is a commune in the Puy-de-Dôme department in Auvergne in central France.

== See also ==
- Communes of the Puy-de-Dôme department
