= Grandeyrolles =

- Commune
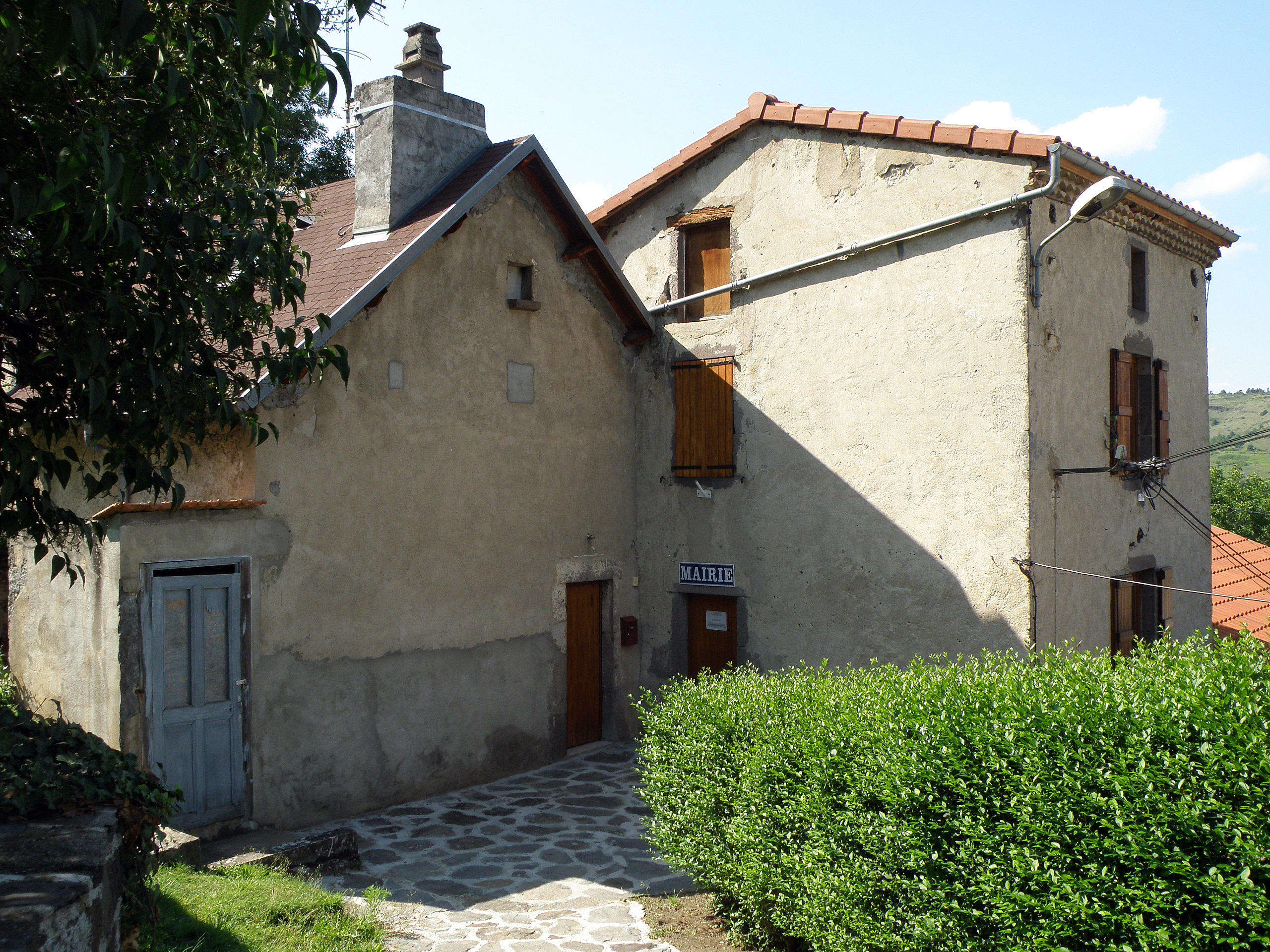
- The town hall in Grandeyrolles

- Coat of arms
- Location of Grandeyrolles
- Location within France Location within Auvergne-Rhône-Alpes
- Coordinates: 45°34′40″N 3°03′25″E
- Country: France
- Region: Auvergne-Rhône-Alpes
- Department: Puy-de-Dôme
- Arrondissement: Issoire
- Canton: Le Sancy
- Intercommunality: Agglo Pays d'Issoire

Government
  - Mayor (2026–32): Jean-Pascal Theulle
- Area^{1}: 5.28 km^{2} (2.04 sq mi)
- Elevation: 650 m (2,130 ft)
- Highest elevation: 841 m (2,759 ft)
- Lowest elevation: 518 m (1,699 ft)
- Population (2023): 55
  - Density: 10/km^{2} (27/sq mi)
- Time zone: UTC+01:00 (CET)
  - Summer (DST): UTC+02:00 (CEST)
- INSEE/Postal code: 63172 /63320
- ^{1} French Land Register data, which excludes lakes, ponds, glaciers > 1 km^{2} (0.386 sq mi or 247 acres) and river estuaries.

Grandeyrolles (French pronunciation: [ɡʁɑ̃deʁɔl]) is a commune in the Puy-de-Dôme department in Auvergne in central France.

== See also ==
- Communes of the Puy-de-Dôme department
