= Saint-Vincent, Puy-de-Dôme =

Saint-Vincent
- Commune
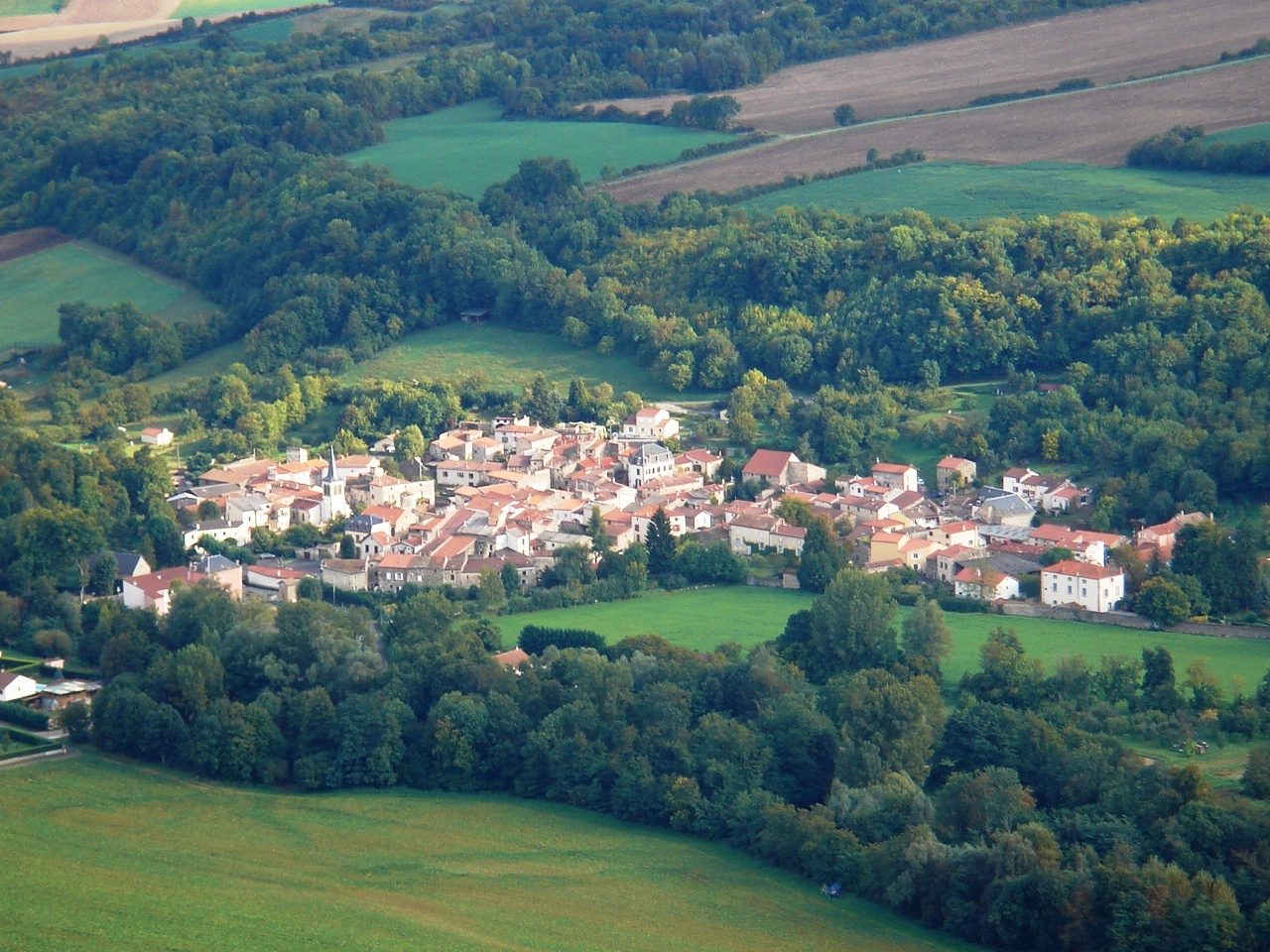
- A general view of Saint-Vincent
- Location of Saint-Vincent
- Location within France Location within Auvergne-Rhône-Alpes
- Coordinates: 45°32′59″N 3°08′01″E
- Country: France
- Region: Auvergne-Rhône-Alpes
- Department: Puy-de-Dôme
- Arrondissement: Issoire
- Canton: Le Sancy
- Intercommunality: Agglo Pays d'Issoire

Government
  - Mayor (2026–32): Yves Coste
- Area^{1}: 5.84 km^{2} (2.25 sq mi)
- Elevation: 460 m (1,510 ft)
- Highest elevation: 779 m (2,556 ft)
- Lowest elevation: 463 m (1,519 ft)
- Population (2023): 417
  - Density: 71.4/km^{2} (185/sq mi)
- Time zone: UTC+01:00 (CET)
  - Summer (DST): UTC+02:00 (CEST)
- INSEE/Postal code: 63403 /63320
- ^{1} French Land Register data, which excludes lakes, ponds, glaciers > 1 km^{2} (0.386 sq mi or 247 acres) and river estuaries.

Saint-Vincent (French pronunciation: [sɛ̃ vɛ̃sɑ̃]) is a commune in the Puy-de-Dôme department in Auvergne-Rhône-Alpes in central France.

== See also ==
- Communes of the Puy-de-Dôme department
