= Saint-Pierre-Colamine =

- Commune
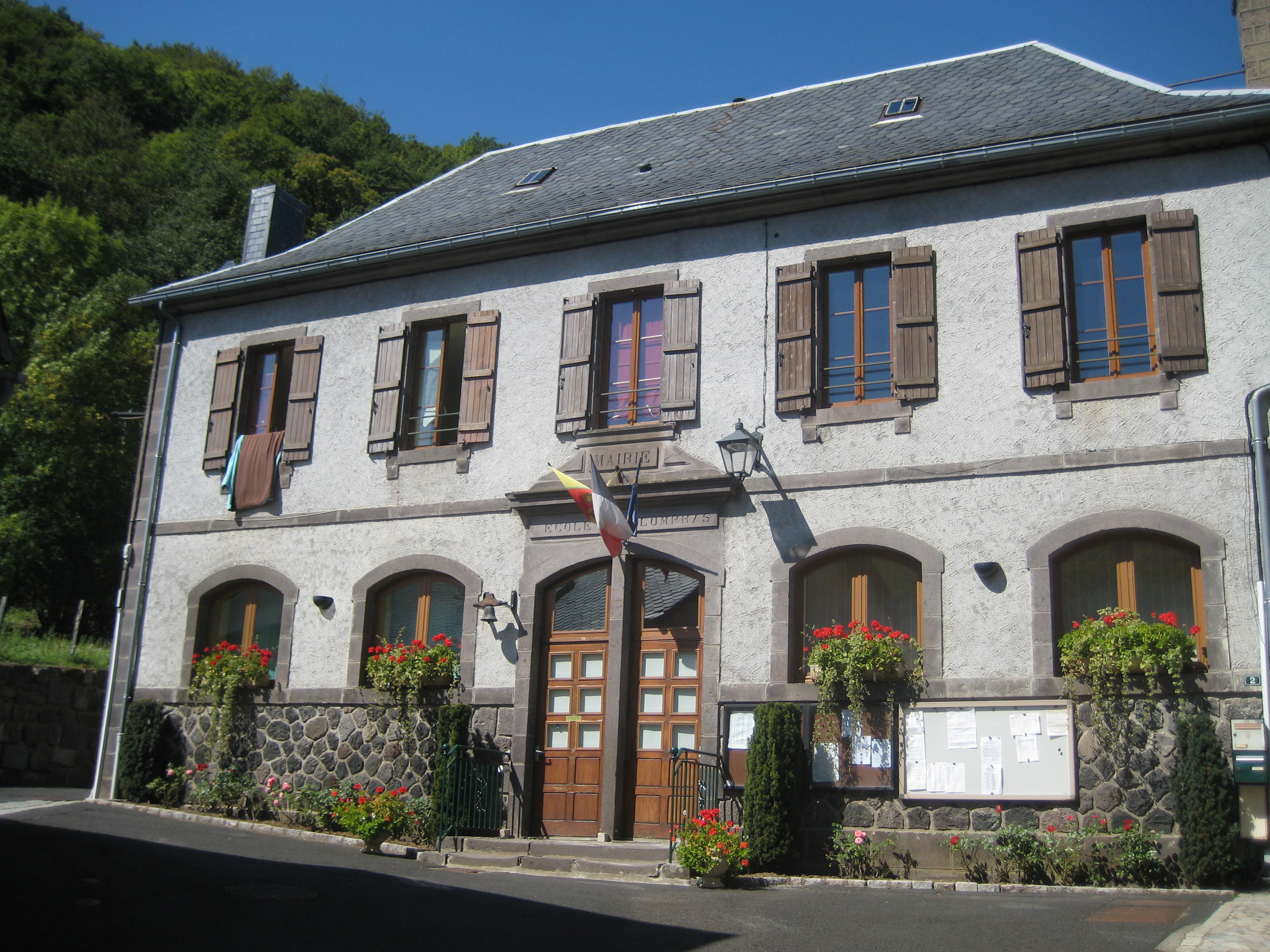
- The town hall in Saint-Pierre-Colamine
- Location of Saint-Pierre-Colamine
- Location within France Location within Auvergne-Rhône-Alpes
- Coordinates: 45°31′52″N 2°58′30″E
- Country: France
- Region: Auvergne-Rhône-Alpes
- Department: Puy-de-Dôme
- Arrondissement: Issoire
- Canton: Le Sancy

Government
  - Mayor (2020–2026): Michel Clech
- Area^{1}: 17.2 km^{2} (6.6 sq mi)
- Elevation: 730 m (2,400 ft)
- Highest elevation: 1,223 m (4,012 ft)
- Lowest elevation: 706 m (2,316 ft)
- Population (2023): 247
  - Density: 14.4/km^{2} (37.2/sq mi)
- Time zone: UTC+01:00 (CET)
  - Summer (DST): UTC+02:00 (CEST)
- INSEE/Postal code: 63383 /63610
- ^{1} French Land Register data, which excludes lakes, ponds, glaciers > 1 km^{2} (0.386 sq mi or 247 acres) and river estuaries.

Saint-Pierre-Colamine (French pronunciation: [sɛ̃ pjɛʁ kɔlamin]) is a commune in the Puy-de-Dôme department in Auvergne in central France.

== See also ==
- Communes of the Puy-de-Dôme department
