= Clémensat =

- Commune
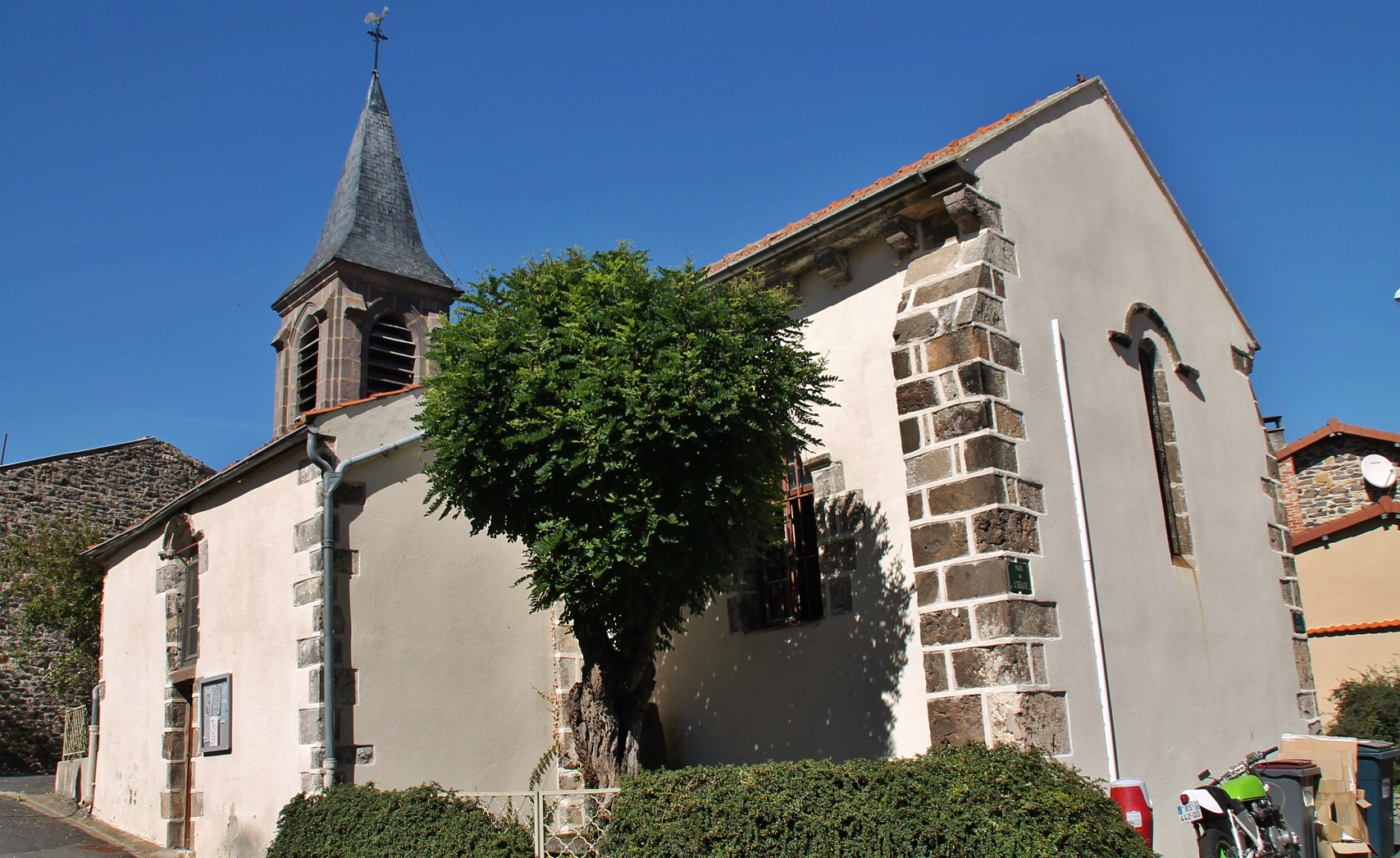
- The church in Clémensat

- Coat of arms
- Location of Clémensat
- Location within France Location within Auvergne-Rhône-Alpes
- Coordinates: 45°33′49″N 3°06′19″E
- Country: France
- Region: Auvergne-Rhône-Alpes
- Department: Puy-de-Dôme
- Arrondissement: Issoire
- Canton: Le Sancy
- Intercommunality: Agglo Pays d'Issoire

Government
  - Mayor (2026–32): Emilie Schumacher
- Area^{1}: 3.21 km^{2} (1.24 sq mi)
- Elevation: 530 m (1,740 ft)
- Highest elevation: 780 m (2,560 ft)
- Lowest elevation: 536 m (1,759 ft)
- Population (2023): 122
  - Density: 38.0/km^{2} (98.4/sq mi)
- Time zone: UTC+01:00 (CET)
  - Summer (DST): UTC+02:00 (CEST)
- INSEE/Postal code: 63111 /63320
- ^{1} French Land Register data, which excludes lakes, ponds, glaciers > 1 km^{2} (0.386 sq mi or 247 acres) and river estuaries.

Clémensat (French pronunciation: [klemɑ̃sa]) is a commune in the Puy-de-Dôme department in Auvergne-Rhône-Alpes in central France.

== See also ==
- Communes of the Puy-de-Dôme department
