= Larodde =

- Commune
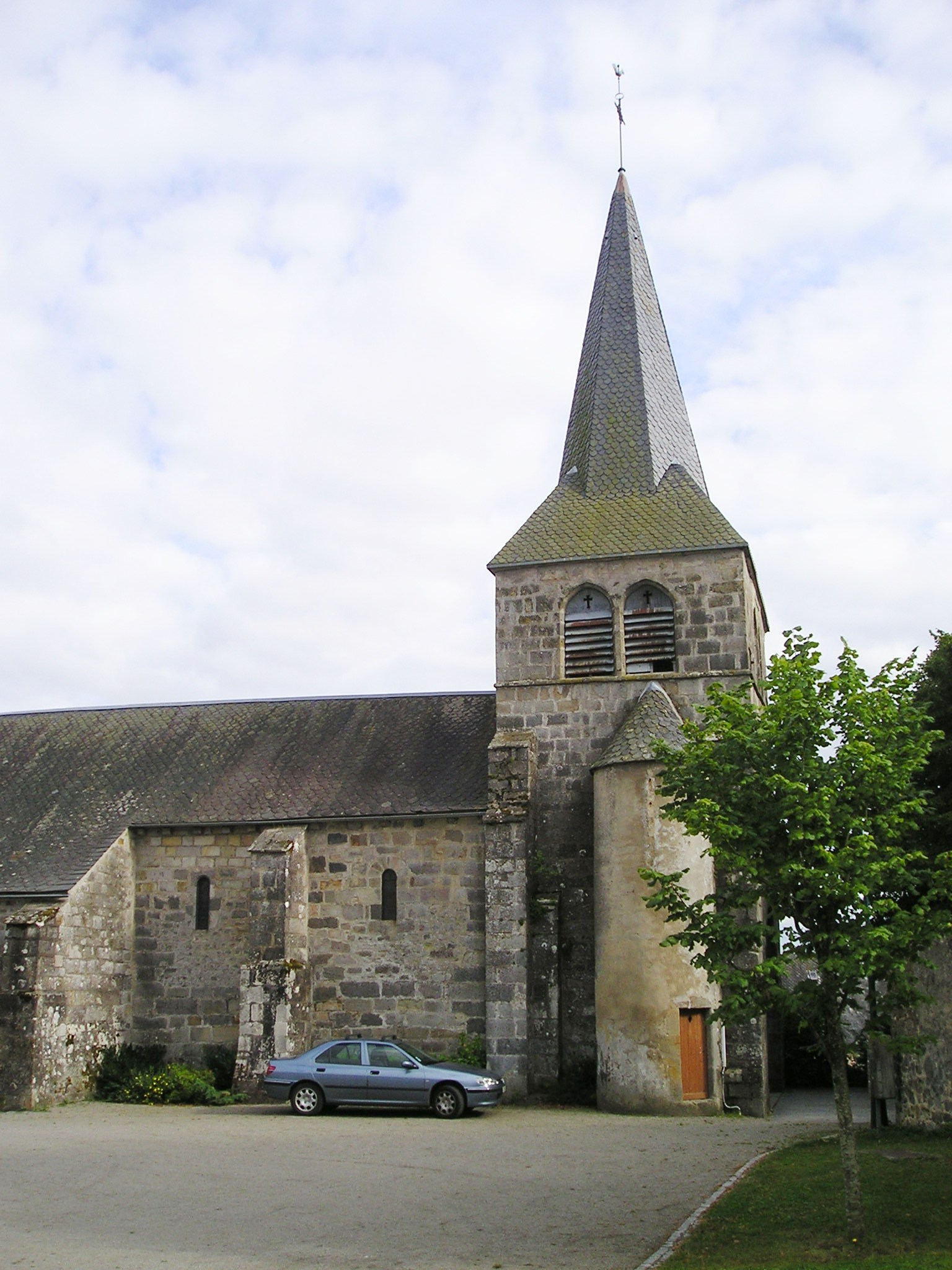
- The church in Larodde

- Coat of arms
- Location of Larodde
- Location within France Location within Auvergne-Rhône-Alpes
- Coordinates: 45°31′36″N 2°33′02″E
- Country: France
- Region: Auvergne-Rhône-Alpes
- Department: Puy-de-Dôme
- Arrondissement: Issoire
- Canton: Le Sancy
- Intercommunality: Dômes Sancy Artense

Government
  - Mayor (2026–32): Georges Gay
- Area^{1}: 23.04 km^{2} (8.90 sq mi)
- Elevation: 780 m (2,560 ft)
- Highest elevation: 868 m (2,848 ft)
- Lowest elevation: 520 m (1,710 ft)
- Population (2023): 296
  - Density: 12.8/km^{2} (33.3/sq mi)
- Time zone: UTC+01:00 (CET)
  - Summer (DST): UTC+02:00 (CEST)
- INSEE/Postal code: 63190 /63690
- ^{1} French Land Register data, which excludes lakes, ponds, glaciers > 1 km^{2} (0.386 sq mi or 247 acres) and river estuaries.

Larodde (French pronunciation: [laʁɔd]) is a commune in the Puy-de-Dôme department in Auvergne in central France.

== See also ==
- Communes of the Puy-de-Dôme department
