= Cros, Puy-de-Dôme =

Cros
- Commune
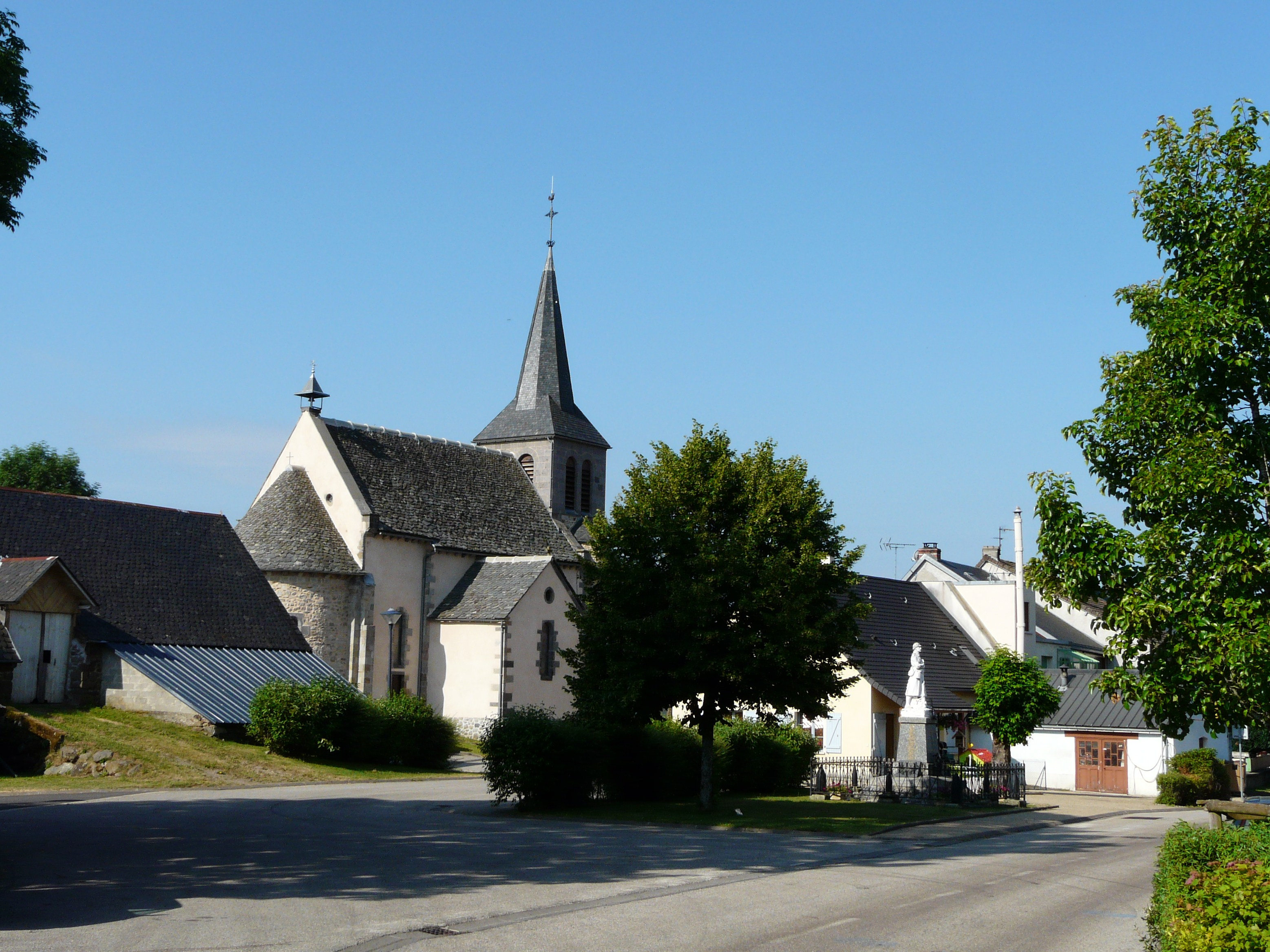
- The church and surroundings in Cros
- Location of Cros
- Location within France Location within Auvergne-Rhône-Alpes
- Coordinates: 45°28′29″N 2°36′09″E
- Country: France
- Region: Auvergne-Rhône-Alpes
- Department: Puy-de-Dôme
- Arrondissement: Issoire
- Canton: Le Sancy
- Intercommunality: Dômes Sancy Artense

Government
  - Mayor (2026–32): Jean-Louis Gatignol
- Area^{1}: 19.62 km^{2} (7.58 sq mi)
- Elevation: 798 m (2,618 ft)
- Highest elevation: 923 m (3,028 ft)
- Lowest elevation: 675 m (2,215 ft)
- Population (2023): 171
  - Density: 8.72/km^{2} (22.6/sq mi)
- Time zone: UTC+01:00 (CET)
  - Summer (DST): UTC+02:00 (CEST)
- INSEE/Postal code: 63129 /63810
- ^{1} French Land Register data, which excludes lakes, ponds, glaciers > 1 km^{2} (0.386 sq mi or 247 acres) and river estuaries.

Cros is a commune in the Puy-de-Dôme department in Auvergne-Rhône-Alpes in central France.

== See also ==
- Communes of the Puy-de-Dôme department
