= Saint-Donat =

- Commune
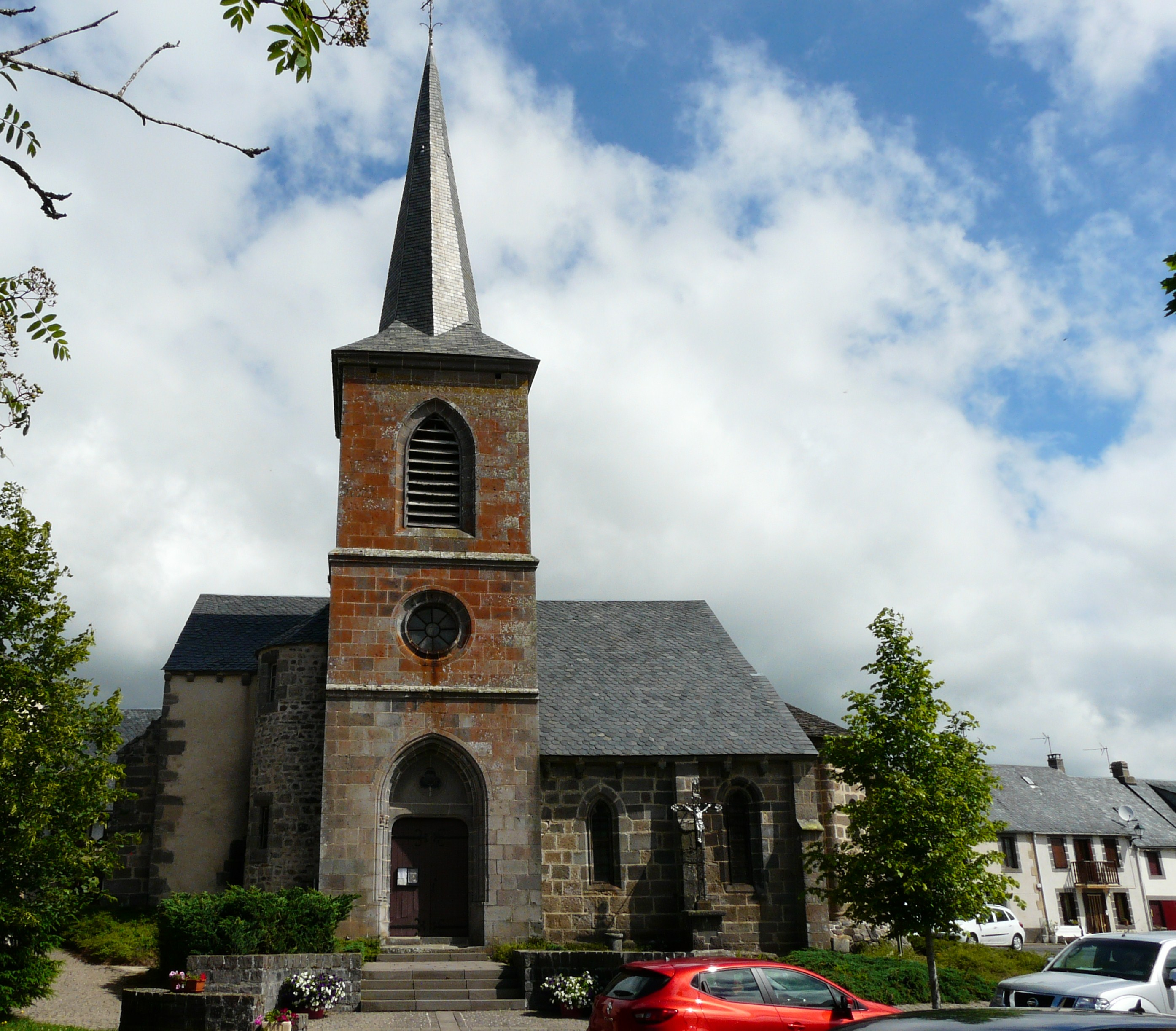
- The church in Saint-Donat

- Coat of arms
- Location of Saint-Donat
- Location within France Location within Auvergne-Rhône-Alpes
- Coordinates: 45°28′N 2°43′E
- Country: France
- Region: Auvergne-Rhône-Alpes
- Department: Puy-de-Dôme
- Arrondissement: Issoire
- Canton: Le Sancy
- Intercommunality: Dômes Sancy Artense

Government
  - Mayor (2026–32): Laurent Bernard
- Area^{1}: 33.27 km^{2} (12.85 sq mi)
- Elevation: 1,048 m (3,438 ft)
- Highest elevation: 1,184 m (3,885 ft)
- Lowest elevation: 795 m (2,608 ft)
- Population (2023): 198
  - Density: 5.95/km^{2} (15.4/sq mi)
- Time zone: UTC+01:00 (CET)
  - Summer (DST): UTC+02:00 (CEST)
- INSEE/Postal code: 63336 /63680
- ^{1} French Land Register data, which excludes lakes, ponds, glaciers > 1 km^{2} (0.386 sq mi or 247 acres) and river estuaries.

Saint-Donat (French pronunciation: [sɛ̃ dɔna]; Auvergnat: Sent Donat) is a commune in the Puy-de-Dôme department in Auvergne in central France.

== Tourism and heritage ==
The commune has been awarded the “Commune à découvrir” label. (2 clocks in 2024)

== See also ==
- Communes of the Puy-de-Dôme department
