= Picherande =

- Commune
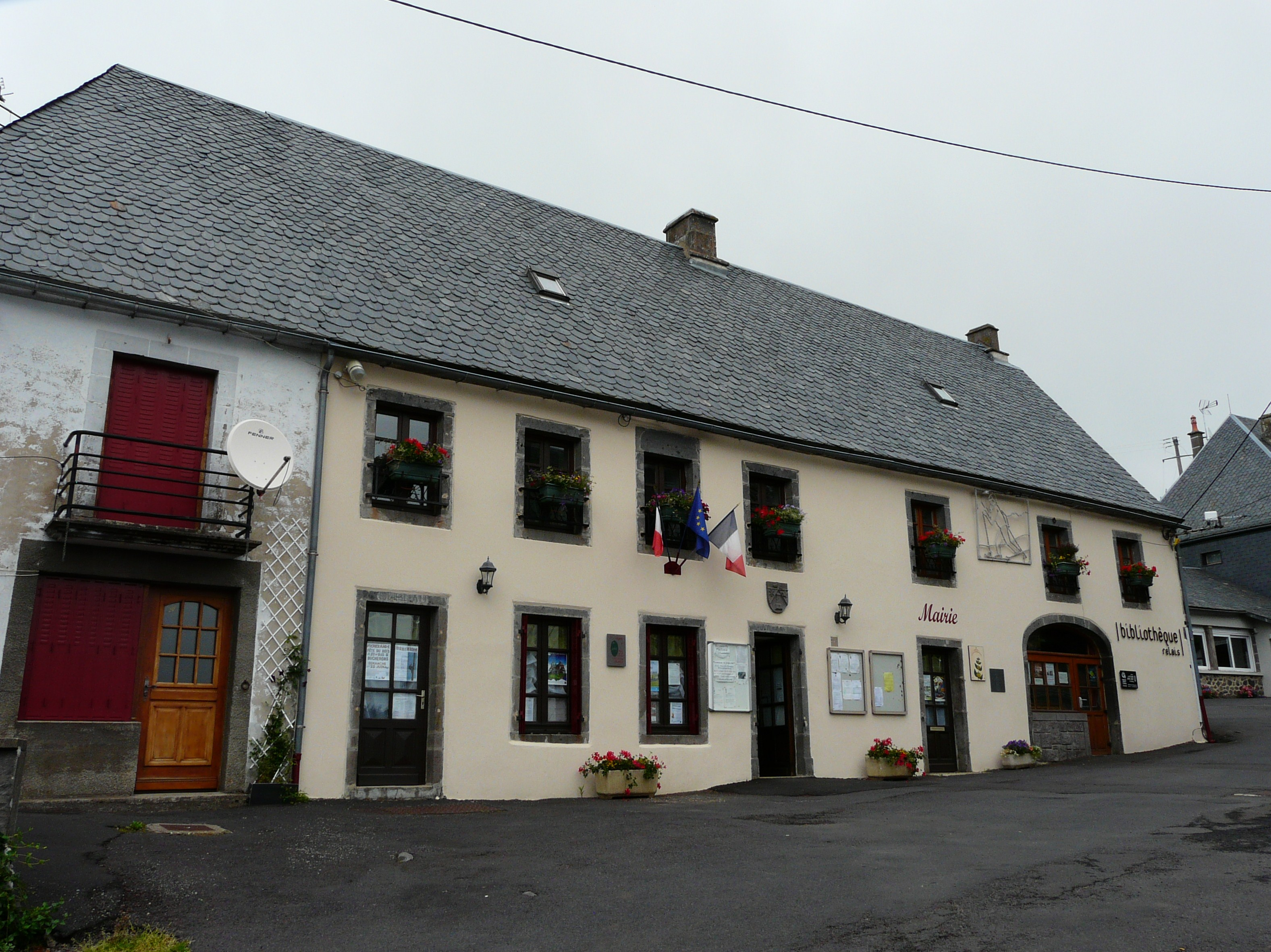
- The town hall in Picherande

- Coat of arms
- Location of Picherande
- Location within France Location within Auvergne-Rhône-Alpes
- Coordinates: 45°27′54″N 2°46′01″E
- Country: France
- Region: Auvergne-Rhône-Alpes
- Department: Puy-de-Dôme
- Arrondissement: Issoire
- Canton: Le Sancy
- Intercommunality: Massif du Sancy

Government
  - Mayor (2026–32): Frédéric Echavidre
- Area^{1}: 44.26 km^{2} (17.09 sq mi)
- Elevation: 1,128 m (3,701 ft)
- Highest elevation: 1,722 m (5,650 ft)
- Lowest elevation: 993 m (3,258 ft)
- Population (2023): 324
  - Density: 7.32/km^{2} (19.0/sq mi)
- Time zone: UTC+01:00 (CET)
  - Summer (DST): UTC+02:00 (CEST)
- INSEE/Postal code: 63279 /63113
- ^{1} French Land Register data, which excludes lakes, ponds, glaciers > 1 km^{2} (0.386 sq mi or 247 acres) and river estuaries.

Picherande (French pronunciation: [piʃʁɑ̃d]; Occitan: Picharanda) is a commune in the Puy-de-Dôme département in Auvergne in central France.

== Geography ==
The river Rhue forms all of the commune's eastern border.

== See also ==
- Communes of the Puy-de-Dôme department
