= Canton of Le Sancy =

Coordinates: 45.59°N 2.74°E

The canton of Le Sancy is an administrative division of the Puy-de-Dôme department, central France. It was created at the French canton reorganisation which came into effect in March 2015. Its seat is in La Bourboule.

It consists of the following communes:

1. Avèze
2. Bagnols
3. Besse-et-Saint-Anastaise
4. La Bourboule
5. Chambon-sur-Lac
6. Champeix
7. Chastreix
8. Clémensat
9. Compains
10. Courgoul
11. Cros
12. Les Deux-Rives
13. Égliseneuve-d'Entraigues
14. Espinchal
15. Grandeyrolles
16. Labessette
17. Larodde
18. Ludesse
19. Mont-Dore
20. Montaigut-le-Blanc
21. Murat-le-Quaire
22. Murol
23. Picherande
24. Saint-Diéry
25. Saint-Donat
26. Saint-Floret
27. Saint-Genès-Champespe
28. Saint-Nectaire
29. Saint-Pierre-Colamine
30. Saint-Sauves-d'Auvergne
31. Saint-Victor-la-Rivière
32. Saint-Vincent
33. Saurier
34. Singles
35. Solignat
36. Tauves
37. La Tour-d'Auvergne
38. Tourzel-Ronzières
39. Trémouille-Saint-Loup
40. Valbeleix
41. Verrières
42. Vodable
