= Saint-Genès-Champespe =

- Commune
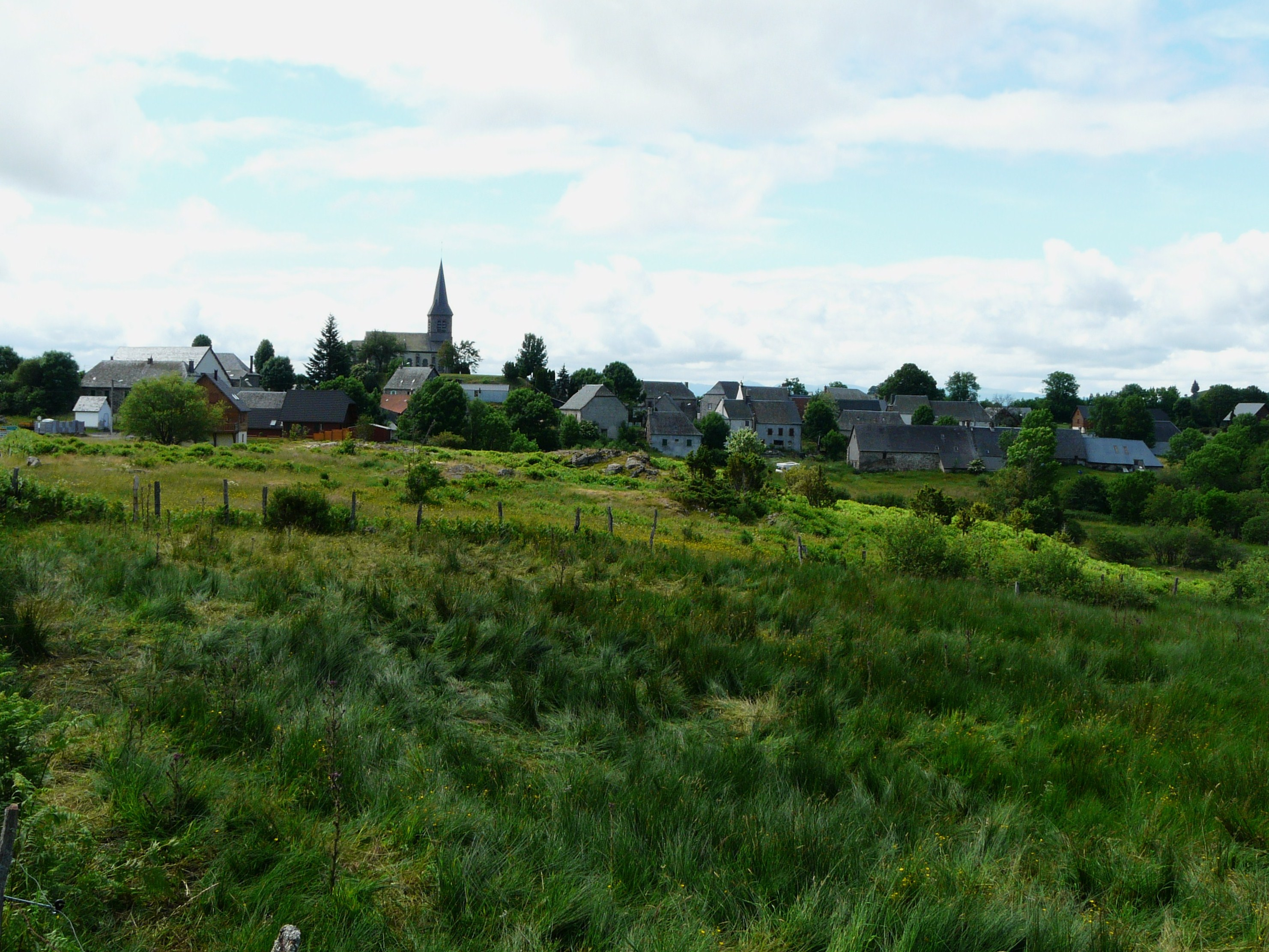
- A general view of Saint-Genès-Champespe

- Coat of arms
- Location of Saint-Genès-Champespe
- Location within France Location within Auvergne-Rhône-Alpes
- Coordinates: 45°25′08″N 2°43′26″E
- Country: France
- Region: Auvergne-Rhône-Alpes
- Department: Puy-de-Dôme
- Arrondissement: Issoire
- Canton: Le Sancy
- Intercommunality: Massif du Sancy

Government
  - Mayor (2020–2026): Roland Perron
- Area^{1}: 32.33 km^{2} (12.48 sq mi)
- Elevation: 1,040 m (3,410 ft)
- Highest elevation: 1,056 m (3,465 ft)
- Lowest elevation: 858 m (2,815 ft)
- Population (2023): 200
  - Density: 6.2/km^{2} (16/sq mi)
- Time zone: UTC+01:00 (CET)
  - Summer (DST): UTC+02:00 (CEST)
- INSEE/Postal code: 63346 /63850
- ^{1} French Land Register data, which excludes lakes, ponds, glaciers > 1 km^{2} (0.386 sq mi or 247 acres) and river estuaries.

Saint-Genès-Champespe is a commune in the Puy-de-Dôme department in Auvergne in central France.

== See also ==
- Communes of the Puy-de-Dôme department
