= Trémouille-Saint-Loup =

- Commune
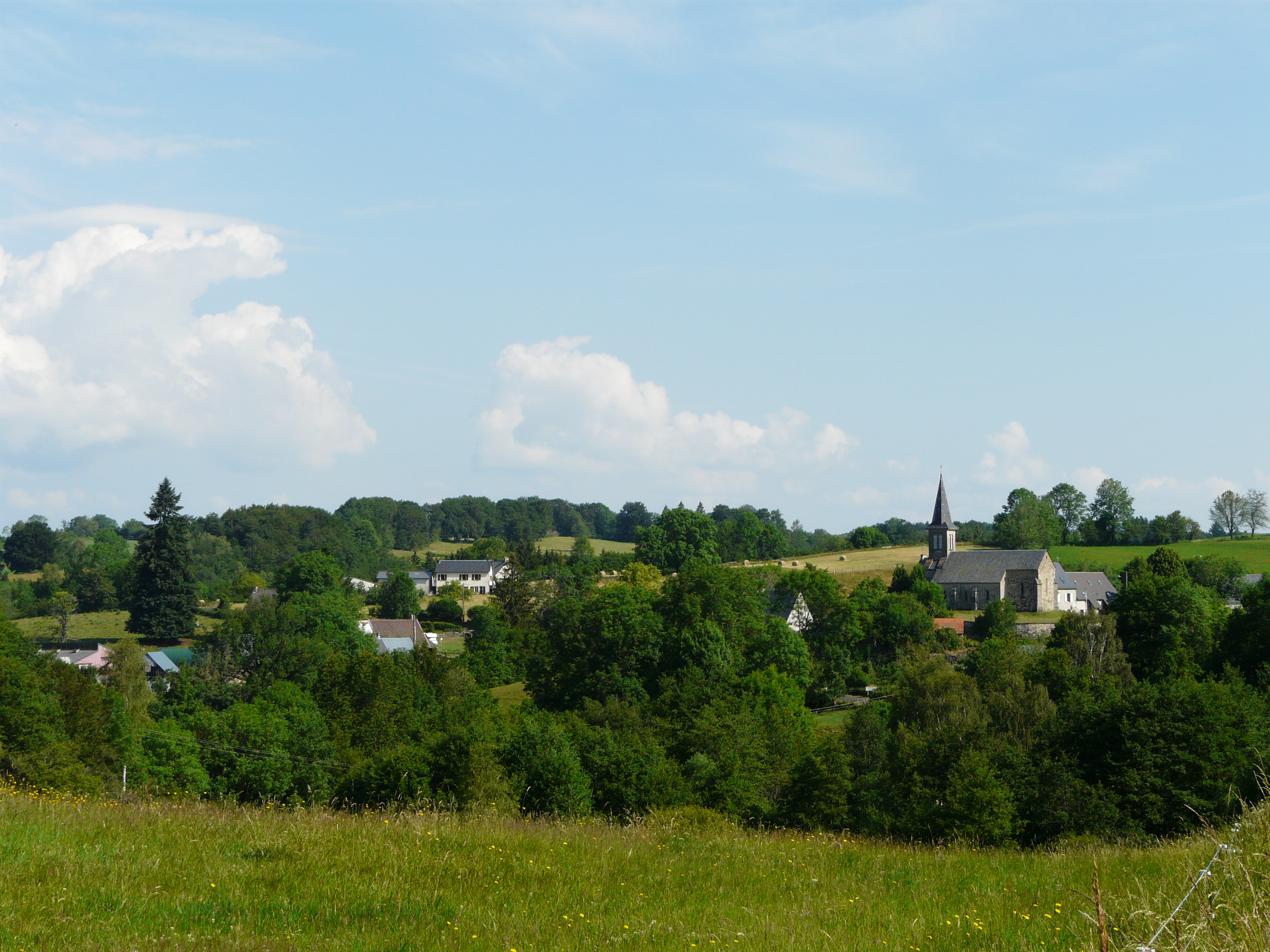
- A general view of Trémouille-Saint-Loup

- Coat of arms
- Location of Trémouille-Saint-Loup
- Location within France Location within Auvergne-Rhône-Alpes
- Coordinates: 45°29′28″N 2°33′40″E
- Country: France
- Region: Auvergne-Rhône-Alpes
- Department: Puy-de-Dôme
- Arrondissement: Issoire
- Canton: Le Sancy

Government
  - Mayor (2026–32): Bruno Eyzat
- Area^{1}: 12.23 km^{2} (4.72 sq mi)
- Elevation: 750 m (2,460 ft)
- Highest elevation: 831 m (2,726 ft)
- Lowest elevation: 594 m (1,949 ft)
- Population (2023): 140
  - Density: 11/km^{2} (30/sq mi)
- Time zone: UTC+01:00 (CET)
  - Summer (DST): UTC+02:00 (CEST)
- INSEE/Postal code: 63437 /63810
- ^{1} French Land Register data, which excludes lakes, ponds, glaciers > 1 km^{2} (0.386 sq mi or 247 acres) and river estuaries.

Trémouille-Saint-Loup (French pronunciation: [tʁemuj sɛ̃ lu]) is a commune in the Puy-de-Dôme department in Auvergne in central France.

== See also ==
- Communes of the Puy-de-Dôme department
