= La Bourboule =

- Commune
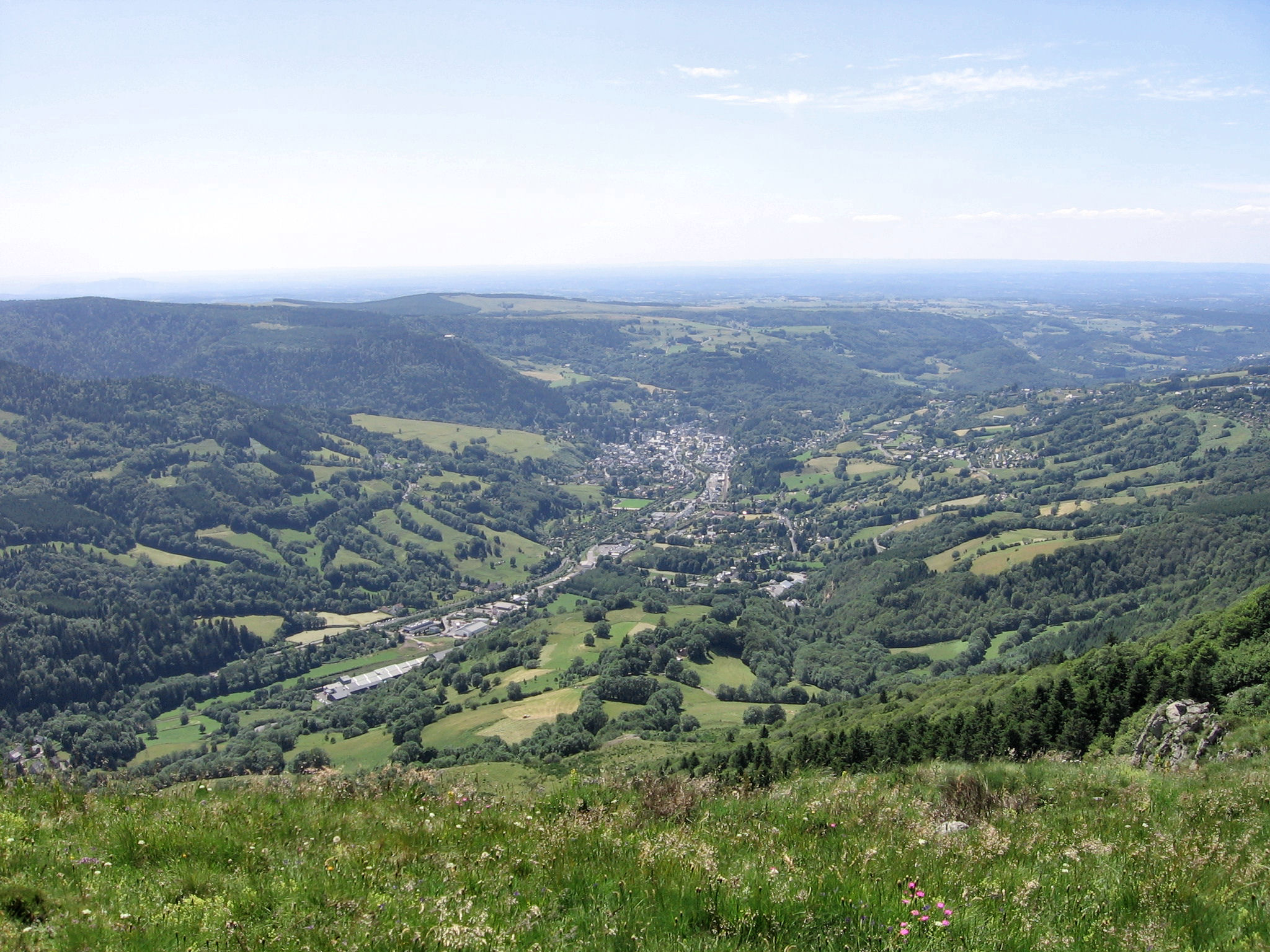
- View from Puy Gros

- Coat of arms
- Location of La Bourboule
- Location within France Location within Auvergne-Rhône-Alpes
- Coordinates: 45°35′21″N 2°44′24″E
- Country: France
- Region: Auvergne-Rhône-Alpes
- Department: Puy-de-Dôme
- Arrondissement: Issoire
- Canton: Le Sancy
- Intercommunality: Massif du Sancy

Government
  - Mayor (2020–2026): François Constantin
- Area^{1}: 12.74 km^{2} (4.92 sq mi)
- Elevation: 850 m (2,790 ft)
- Highest elevation: 1,408 m (4,619 ft)
- Lowest elevation: 812 m (2,664 ft)
- Population (2023): 1,727
  - Density: 135.6/km^{2} (351.1/sq mi)
- Time zone: UTC+01:00 (CET)
  - Summer (DST): UTC+02:00 (CEST)
- INSEE/Postal code: 63047 /63150
- ^{1} French Land Register data, which excludes lakes, ponds, glaciers > 1 km^{2} (0.386 sq mi or 247 acres) and river estuaries.

La Bourboule (French pronunciation: [la buʁbul]; Auvergnat: La Borbola) is a commune in the Puy-de-Dôme department in Auvergne-Rhône-Alpes in central France.

La Bourboule is situated on the right bank of the Dordogne at an average elevation 2,790 feet (850 m). It was known for its mineral waters, but although known to the Romans they were not in much repute till towards the end of the 19th century.

== Population ==
Historical population

Year	Pop.	±% p.a.
1926	2,700	—
1962	2,336	−0.40%
1968	2,496	+1.11%
1975	2,392	−0.61%
1982	2,384	−0.05%
1990	2,113	−1.50%

Year	Pop.	±% p.a.
1999	2,043	−0.37%
2007	2,031	−0.07%
2012	1,891	−1.42%
2017	1,789	−1.10%
2023	1,727	−0.59%

Source: EHESS and INSEE

== See also ==
- Communes of the Puy-de-Dôme department
