= Avèze, Puy-de-Dôme =

Commune in Puy-de-Dôme, France

Avèze
- Commune
- Location of Avèze
- Location within France Location within Auvergne-Rhône-Alpes
- Coordinates: 45°36′00″N 2°35′59″E
- Country: France
- Region: Auvergne-Rhône-Alpes
- Department: Puy-de-Dôme
- Arrondissement: Issoire
- Canton: Le Sancy
- Intercommunality: CC Dômes Sancy Artense

Government
  - Mayor (2026–32): Gilles Bonhomme
- Area^{1}: 22.07 km^{2} (8.52 sq mi)
- Elevation: 850 m (2,790 ft)
- Highest elevation: 958 m (3,143 ft)
- Lowest elevation: 580 m (1,900 ft)
- Population (2023): 158
  - Density: 7.16/km^{2} (18.5/sq mi)
- Time zone: UTC+01:00 (CET)
  - Summer (DST): UTC+02:00 (CEST)
- INSEE/Postal code: 63024 /63690
- ^{1} French Land Register data, which excludes lakes, ponds, glaciers > 1 km^{2} (0.386 sq mi or 247 acres) and river estuaries.

Avèze (French pronunciation: [avɛz]; Occitan: Avesa) is a commune in the Puy-de-Dôme department in Auvergne-Rhône-Alpes in central France.

== Population ==
Historical population
Year	Pop.	±% p.a.
1968	359	—
1975	327	−1.32%
1982	306	−0.94%
1990	258	−2.11%
1999	235	−1.03%
2007	211	−1.34%
2012	190	−2.07%
2017	178	−1.30%
2023	158	−1.97%
Source: INSEE

== See also ==
- Communes of the Puy-de-Dôme department
