= Bagnols, Puy-de-Dôme =

Bagnols
- Commune
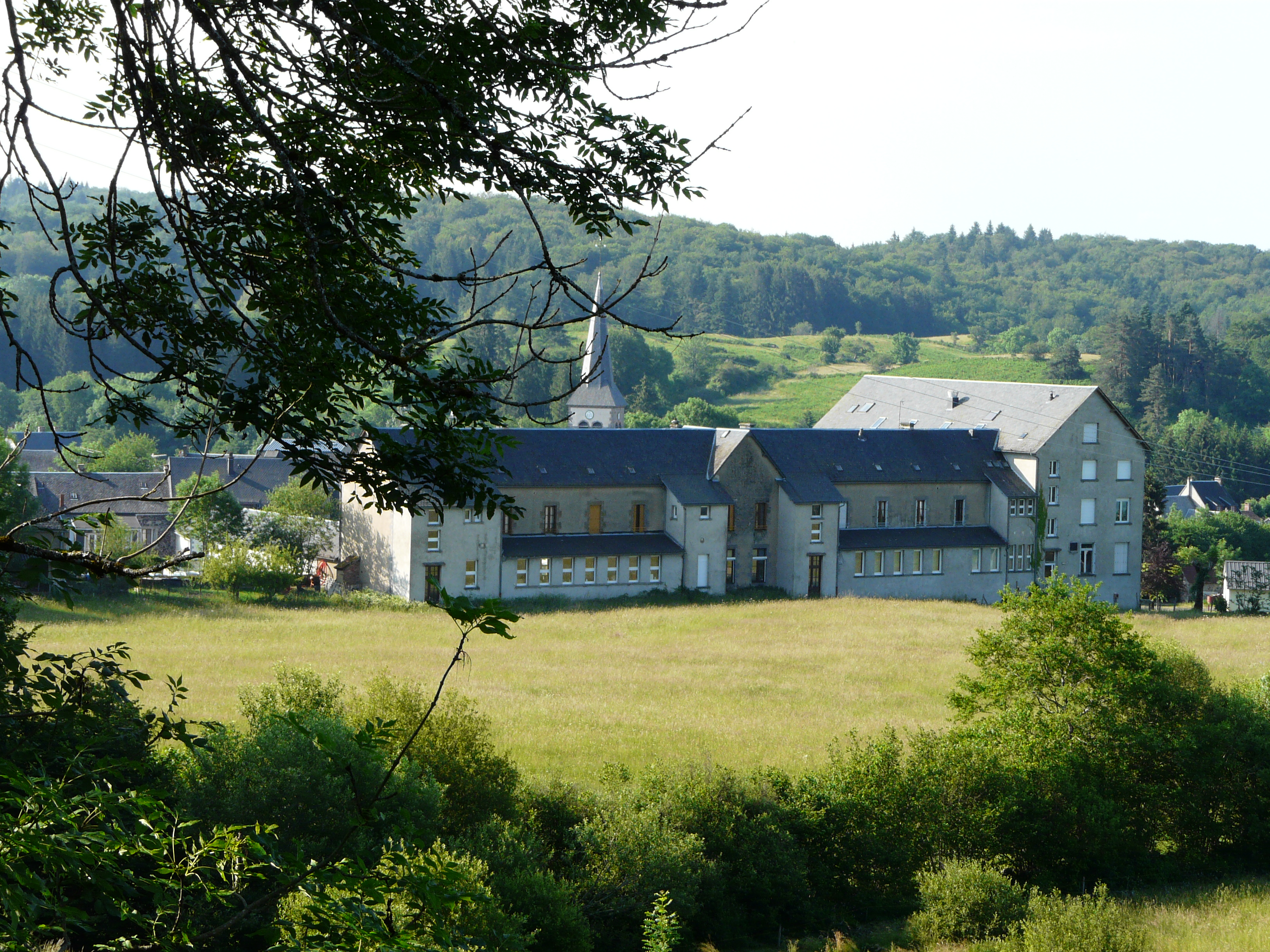
- A general view of Bagnols

- Coat of arms
- Location of Bagnols
- Location within France Location within Auvergne-Rhône-Alpes
- Coordinates: 45°30′04″N 2°37′59″E
- Country: France
- Region: Auvergne-Rhône-Alpes
- Department: Puy-de-Dôme
- Arrondissement: Issoire
- Canton: Le Sancy
- Intercommunality: Dômes Sancy Artense

Government
  - Mayor (2026–32): Alexandre Verdier
- Area^{1}: 42.46 km^{2} (16.39 sq mi)
- Elevation: 850 m (2,790 ft)
- Highest elevation: 1,053 m (3,455 ft)
- Lowest elevation: 679 m (2,228 ft)
- Population (2023): 400
  - Density: 9.4/km^{2} (24/sq mi)
- Time zone: UTC+01:00 (CET)
  - Summer (DST): UTC+02:00 (CEST)
- INSEE/Postal code: 63028 /63810
- Website: bagnols63.fr
- ^{1} French Land Register data, which excludes lakes, ponds, glaciers > 1 km^{2} (0.386 sq mi or 247 acres) and river estuaries.

Bagnols (French pronunciation: [baɲɔl]; Occitan: Banhòus) is a commune in the Puy-de-Dôme department in Auvergne-Rhône-Alpes in central France.

== Population ==
Historical population
Year	Pop.	±% p.a.
1968	1,038	—
1975	905	−1.94%
1982	891	−0.22%
1990	712	−2.76%
1999	532	−3.19%
2007	503	−0.70%
2012	492	−0.44%
2017	440	−2.21%
2023	400	−1.58%
Source: INSEE

== See also ==
- Communes of the Puy-de-Dôme department
