= Veyre =

Coordinates: 45.6881°N 3.2019°E

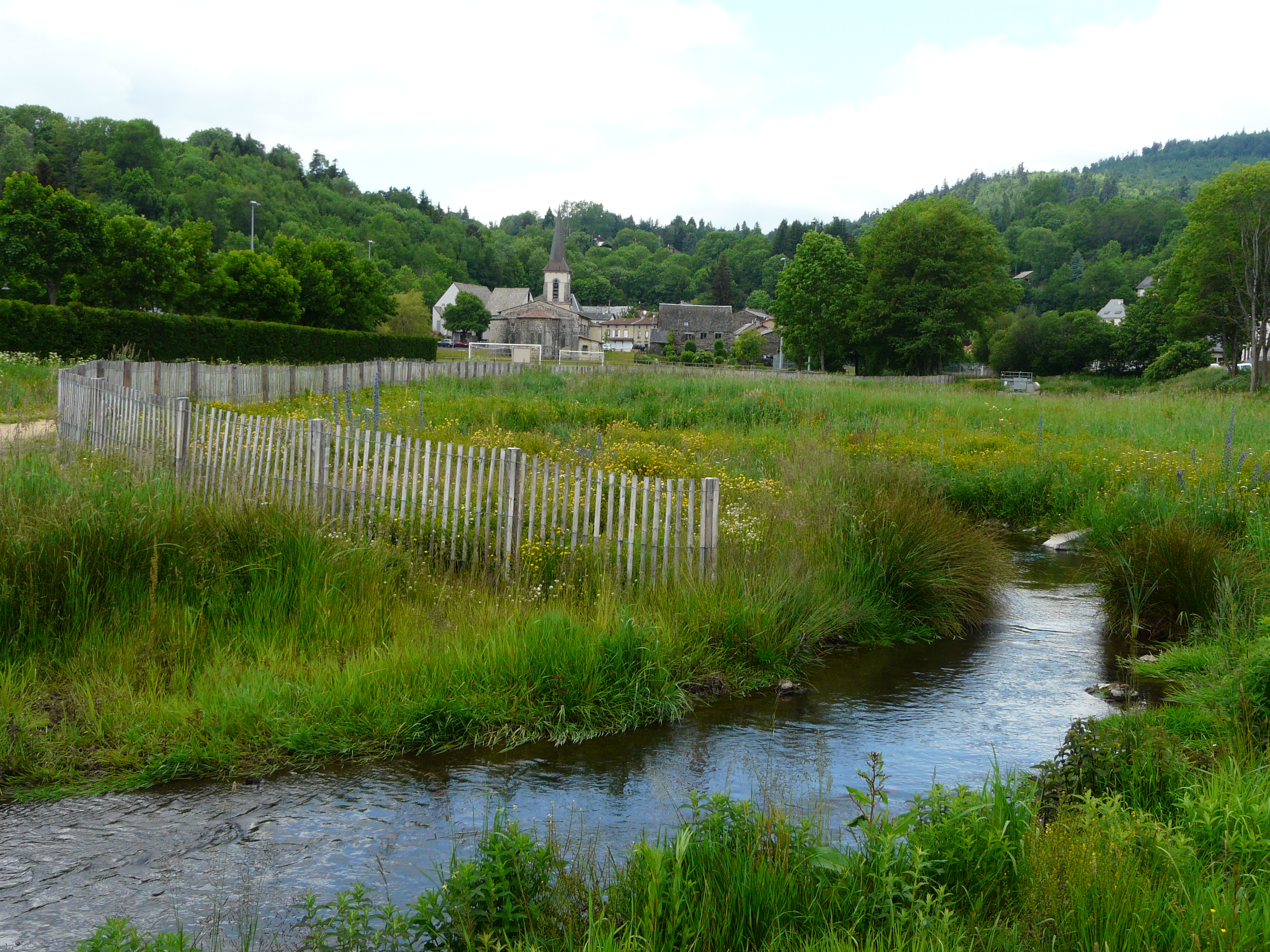
- River at lac d'Aydat

- Location within France Location within Auvergne-Rhône-Alpes

Location
- Country: France
- Region: Auvergne-Rhône-Alpes

Physical characteristics
- Mouth
  - location: Allier
- Length: 32.7 km (20.3 mi)

Basin features
- Progression: Allier→ Loire→ Atlantic Ocean

The Veyre is a left-bank tributary of the river Allier in the French region of Auvergne-Rhône-Alpes.

== Geography ==
The Veyre is 32.7 kilometres (20.3 mi) long. It has no concrete source given that it originates at the plateau des Monts Dore, from the confluence of two streams : la Narse et le Labadeau which begins at the Puy de Vedrine. La Veyre has the particularity of having had its flow breached around 10,000 years ago by a lava flow of the Puy de la Vache and the Puy de Lassolas which formed a volcanic reservoir, the lac d'Aydat. Shortly after the lac d’Aydat, the Veyre then disappears underneath the volcanic heath of la cheire d’Aydat, then reappears downstream of Saint-Saturnin. At Veyre-Monton, between Tallende and Veyre, it is joined by the Monne. It flows into the Allier at Les Martres-de-Veyre.
