= Monne =

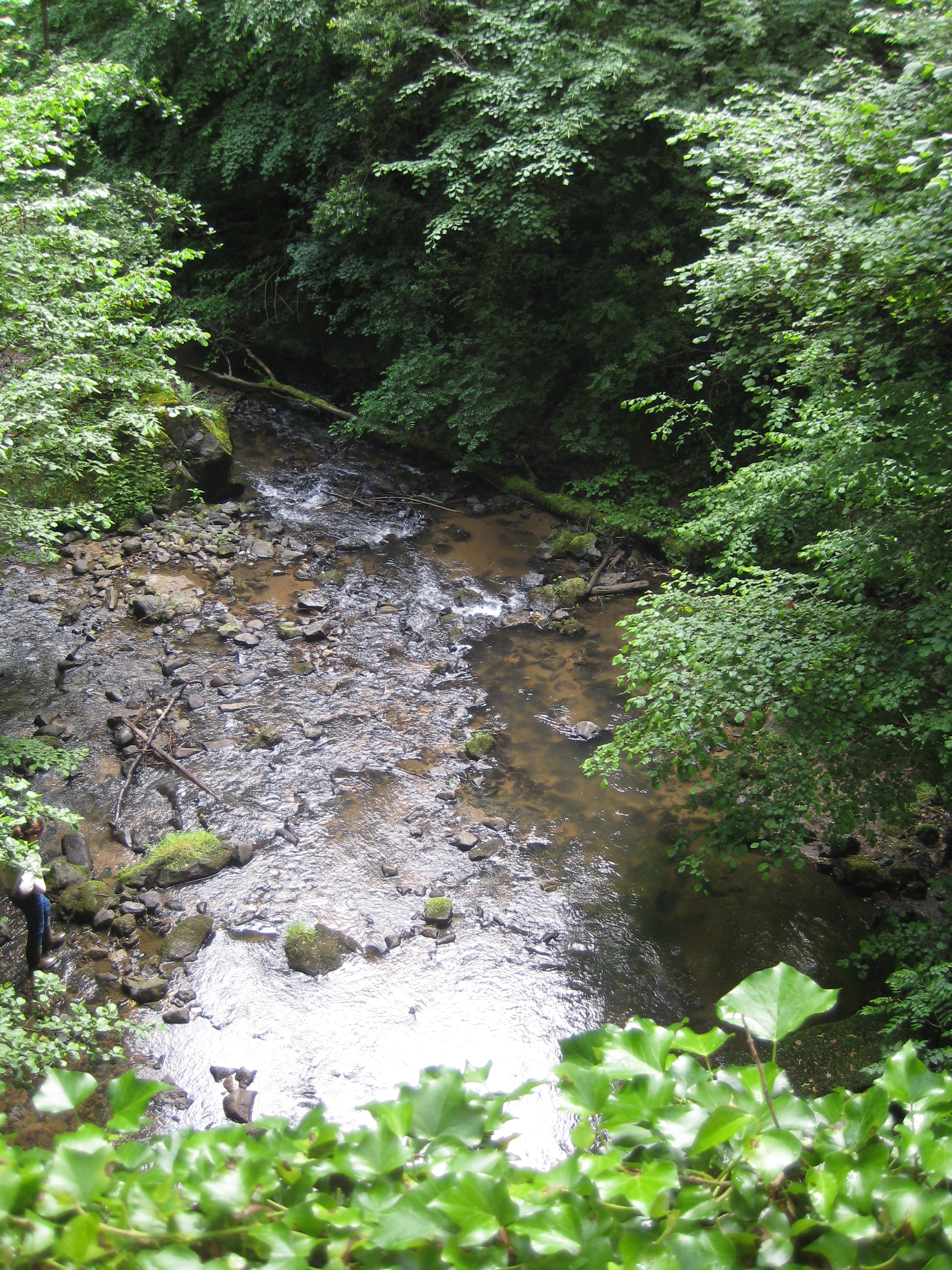
- River at Saint-Saturnin

- Location within France Location within Auvergne-Rhône-Alpes

Location
- Country: France

Physical characteristics
- Mouth
  - location: Veyre
  - coordinates: 45.6644°N 3.1461°E
- Length: 27.9 km (17.3 mi)

Basin features
- Progression: Veyre→ Allier→ Loire→ Atlantic Ocean

The Monne is a small torrential river that originates in the Puy-de-Dôme, near the col de la Croix-Morand, above the village of Mareuge, at 1,300 metres (4,300 ft) above sea level. It joins the Veyre at 380 metres (1,250 ft), near Tallende.

== Geography ==
The river is 27.9 kilometres (17.3 mi) long. The Monne is part of a hydrographical whole, draining les monts Dore. The system is made up of rivers flowing eastward into the river Allier in the plains of the Limagne. To the south lies le pays des Couzes with, from south: la Couze d'Ardes, la Couze Pavin and la Couze Chambon; beyond flows la Monne and the Veyre. Continuing north one finds other rivers feeding from la chaîne des Domes : l'Auzon, l'Artière and la Tiretaine which flows through Royat and Clermont-Ferrand.

All rivers descending more than 1,000 metres (3,300 ft) down to about 350 metres (1,150 ft) etch the granitic ridge of la faille des Limagnes +/- deeply from west to east. The most notable gorges are those of la Monne located between Olloix and Cournols.
