= Saint-Bonnet-près-Orcival =

- Commune
- Location of Saint-Bonnet-près-Orcival
- Location within France Location within Auvergne-Rhône-Alpes
- Coordinates: 45°42′25″N 2°51′36″E
- Country: France
- Region: Auvergne-Rhône-Alpes
- Department: Puy-de-Dôme
- Arrondissement: Issoire
- Canton: Orcines

Government
  - Mayor (2020–2026): Michelle Gaidier
- Area^{1}: 14.99 km^{2} (5.79 sq mi)
- Elevation: 830 m (2,720 ft)
- Highest elevation: 1,046 m (3,432 ft)
- Lowest elevation: 743 m (2,438 ft)
- Population (2023): 571
  - Density: 38.1/km^{2} (98.7/sq mi)
- Time zone: UTC+01:00 (CET)
  - Summer (DST): UTC+02:00 (CEST)
- INSEE/Postal code: 63326 /63210
- ^{1} French Land Register data, which excludes lakes, ponds, glaciers > 1 km^{2} (0.386 sq mi or 247 acres) and river estuaries.

Saint-Bonnet-près-Orcival (French pronunciation: [sɛ̃ bɔnɛ pʁɛ ɔʁsival], literally Saint-Bonnet near Orcival; Auvergnat: Sent Bonet d'Orcival) is a commune in the Puy-de-Dôme department in Auvergne in central France.

== See also ==
- Communes of the Puy-de-Dôme department
