= Puy de Lassolas =

Mountain in central France

Coordinates: 45.71166°N 2.95828°E

The Puy de Lassolas (Occitan: L'Assolelhat, the sunburnt [mountain]) is a volcano in the Chaîne des Puys in France, peaking at 1187 metres. It forms, with the Puy de la Vache, a group of volcanic craters. Together, they thus form two half craters. Their lava flows created several lakes by crossing valleys, including Lake Cassière to the north and Lake Aydat to the south in the Veyre valley.

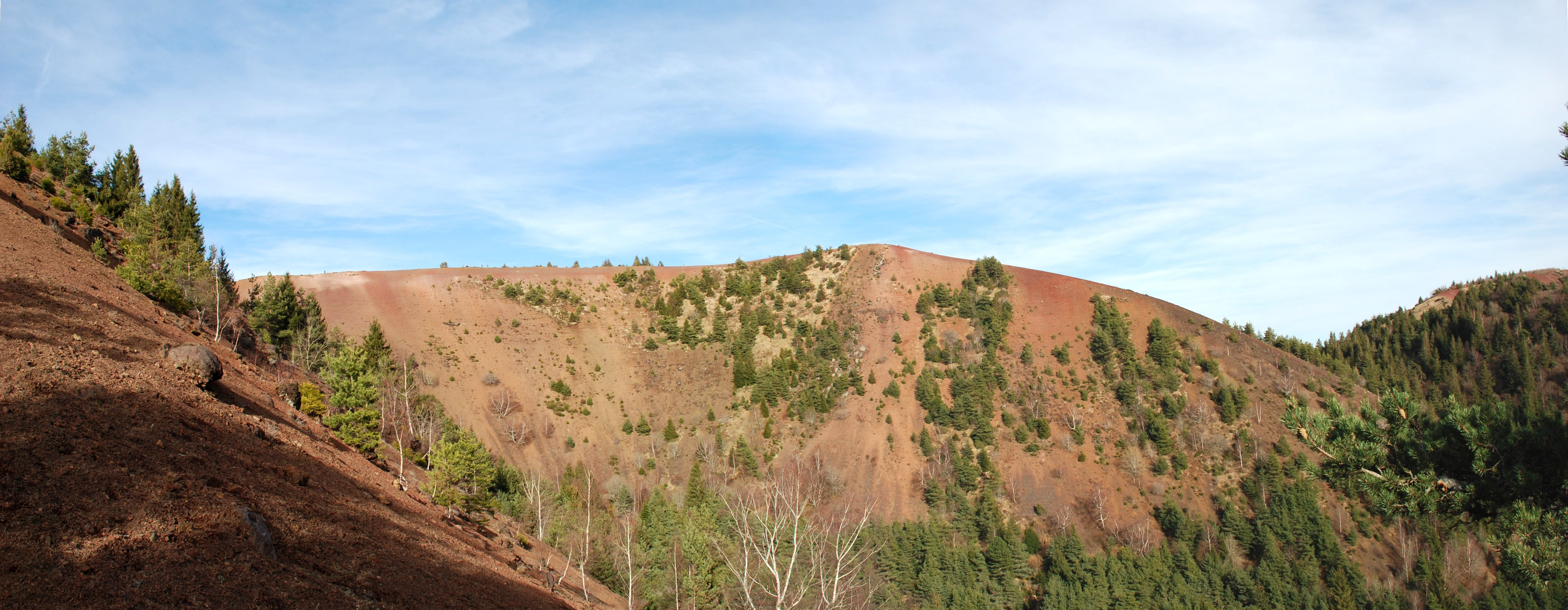
A view of the summit of the Puy de Lassolas
