= Saint-Pierre-Roche =

- Commune
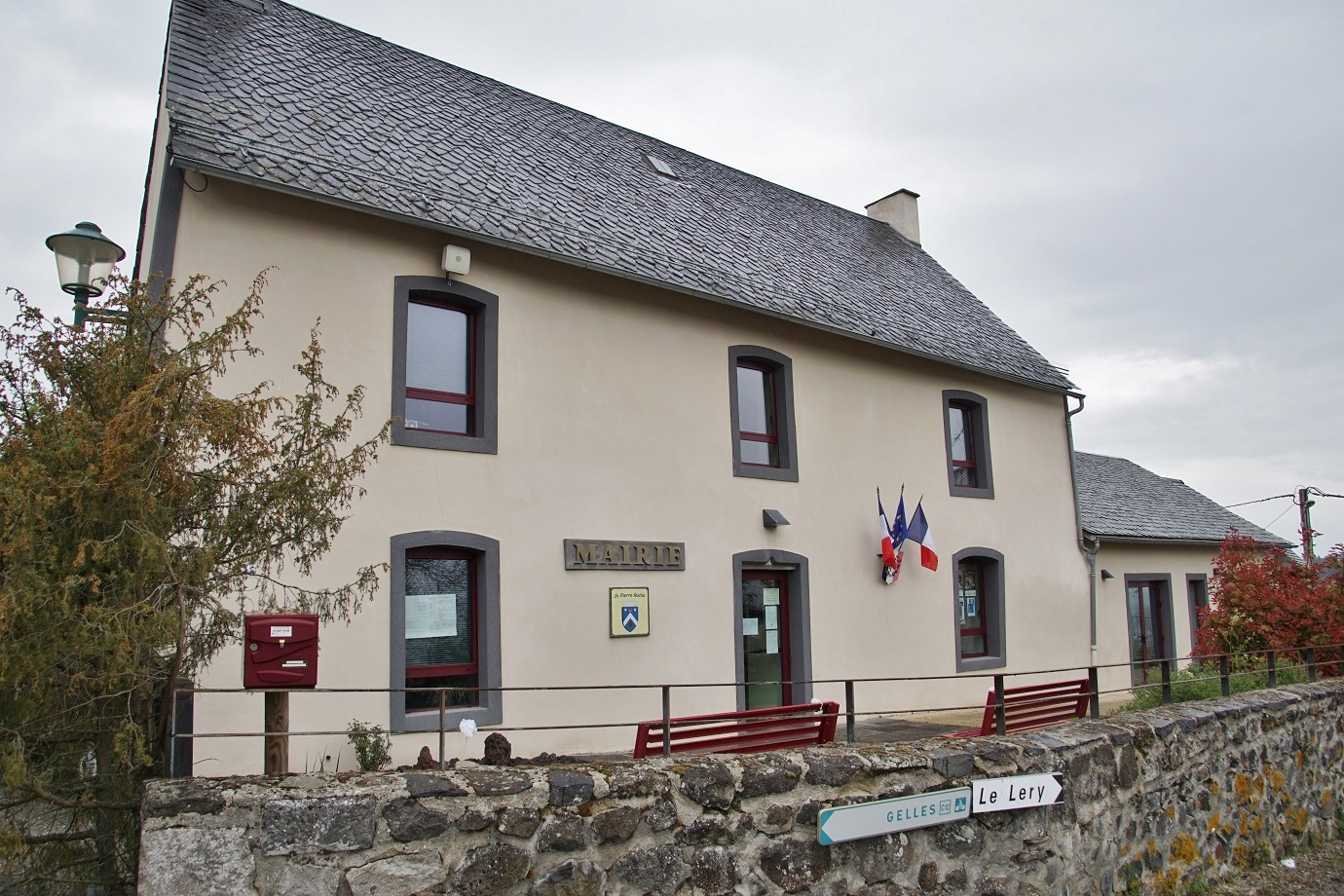
- Saint-Pierre-Roche Town hall

- Coat of arms
- Location of Saint-Pierre-Roche
- Location within France Location within Auvergne-Rhône-Alpes
- Coordinates: 45°43′37″N 2°49′30″E
- Country: France
- Region: Auvergne-Rhône-Alpes
- Department: Puy-de-Dôme
- Arrondissement: Issoire
- Canton: Orcines

Government
  - Mayor (2026–32): Joël Flandin
- Area^{1}: 17.02 km^{2} (6.57 sq mi)
- Elevation: 830 m (2,720 ft)
- Highest elevation: 905 m (2,969 ft)
- Lowest elevation: 694 m (2,277 ft)
- Population (2023): 499
  - Density: 29.3/km^{2} (75.9/sq mi)
- Time zone: UTC+01:00 (CET)
  - Summer (DST): UTC+02:00 (CEST)
- INSEE/Postal code: 63386 /63210
- ^{1} French Land Register data, which excludes lakes, ponds, glaciers > 1 km^{2} (0.386 sq mi or 247 acres) and river estuaries.

Saint-Pierre-Roche (French pronunciation: [sɛ̃ pjɛʁ ʁɔʃ]) is a commune in the Puy-de-Dôme department in Auvergne-Rhône-Alpes in central France.

== See also ==
- Communes of the Puy-de-Dôme department
