= Heume-l'Église =

- Commune
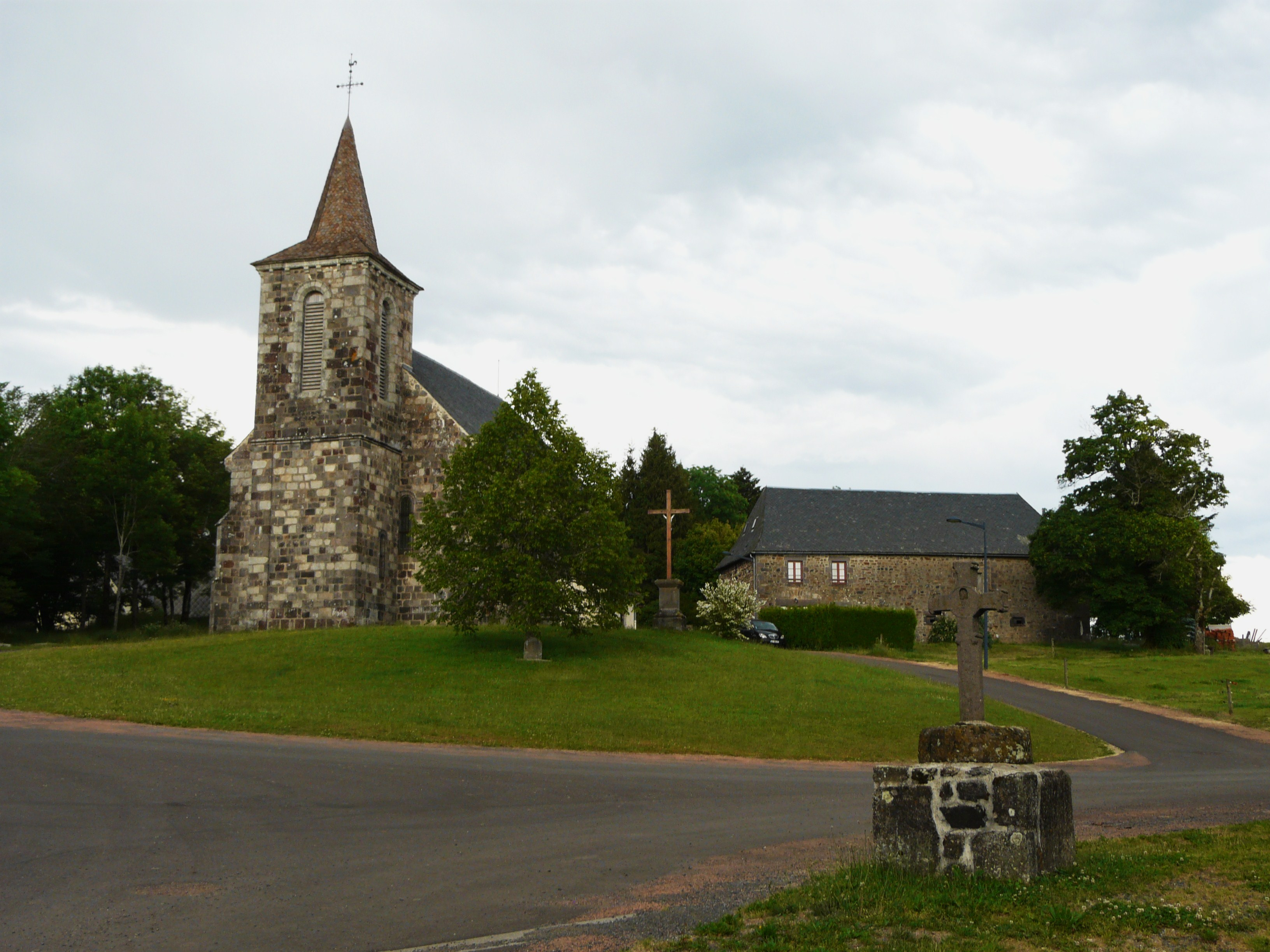
- The church in Heume-l'Église
- Location of Heume-l'Église
- Location within France Location within Auvergne-Rhône-Alpes
- Coordinates: 45°43′13″N 2°44′03″E
- Country: France
- Region: Auvergne-Rhône-Alpes
- Department: Puy-de-Dôme
- Arrondissement: Issoire
- Canton: Orcines
- Intercommunality: Dômes Sancy Artense

Government
  - Mayor (2026–32): Philippe Boyer
- Area^{1}: 14.96 km^{2} (5.78 sq mi)
- Elevation: 935 m (3,068 ft)
- Highest elevation: 1,015 m (3,330 ft)
- Lowest elevation: 797 m (2,615 ft)
- Population (2023): 113
  - Density: 7.55/km^{2} (19.6/sq mi)
- Time zone: UTC+01:00 (CET)
  - Summer (DST): UTC+02:00 (CEST)
- INSEE/Postal code: 63176 /63210
- ^{1} French Land Register data, which excludes lakes, ponds, glaciers > 1 km^{2} (0.386 sq mi or 247 acres) and river estuaries.

Heume-l'Église (French pronunciation: [œm leɡliz]; Occitan: Eume) is a commune in the Puy-de-Dôme department in Auvergne-Rhône-Alpes in central France.

The village mainly consists of a collection of farmhouses, it is a small rural community with approx. 160 occupants. The word "Eglise" translates into "church", there is a church in Heume l'Eglise which served as church for the entire rural community in the surrounding area.

== See also ==
- Communes of the Puy-de-Dôme department
