= Perpezat =

- Commune
- Coat of arms
- Location of Perpezat
- Location within France Location within Auvergne-Rhône-Alpes
- Coordinates: 45°40′48″N 2°46′30″E
- Country: France
- Region: Auvergne-Rhône-Alpes
- Department: Puy-de-Dôme
- Arrondissement: Issoire
- Canton: Orcines

Government
  - Mayor (2026–32): Patrice Faure
- Area^{1}: 36.19 km^{2} (13.97 sq mi)
- Elevation: 900 m (3,000 ft)
- Highest elevation: 1,482 m (4,862 ft)
- Lowest elevation: 757 m (2,484 ft)
- Population (2023): 420
  - Density: 12/km^{2} (30/sq mi)
- Time zone: UTC+01:00 (CET)
  - Summer (DST): UTC+02:00 (CEST)
- INSEE/Postal code: 63274 /63210
- ^{1} French Land Register data, which excludes lakes, ponds, glaciers > 1 km^{2} (0.386 sq mi or 247 acres) and river estuaries.

Perpezat (French pronunciation: [pɛʁpəza]) is a commune in the Puy-de-Dôme department in Auvergne in central France.

== See also ==
- Communes of the Puy-de-Dôme department
