= Chanat-la-Mouteyre =

- Commune
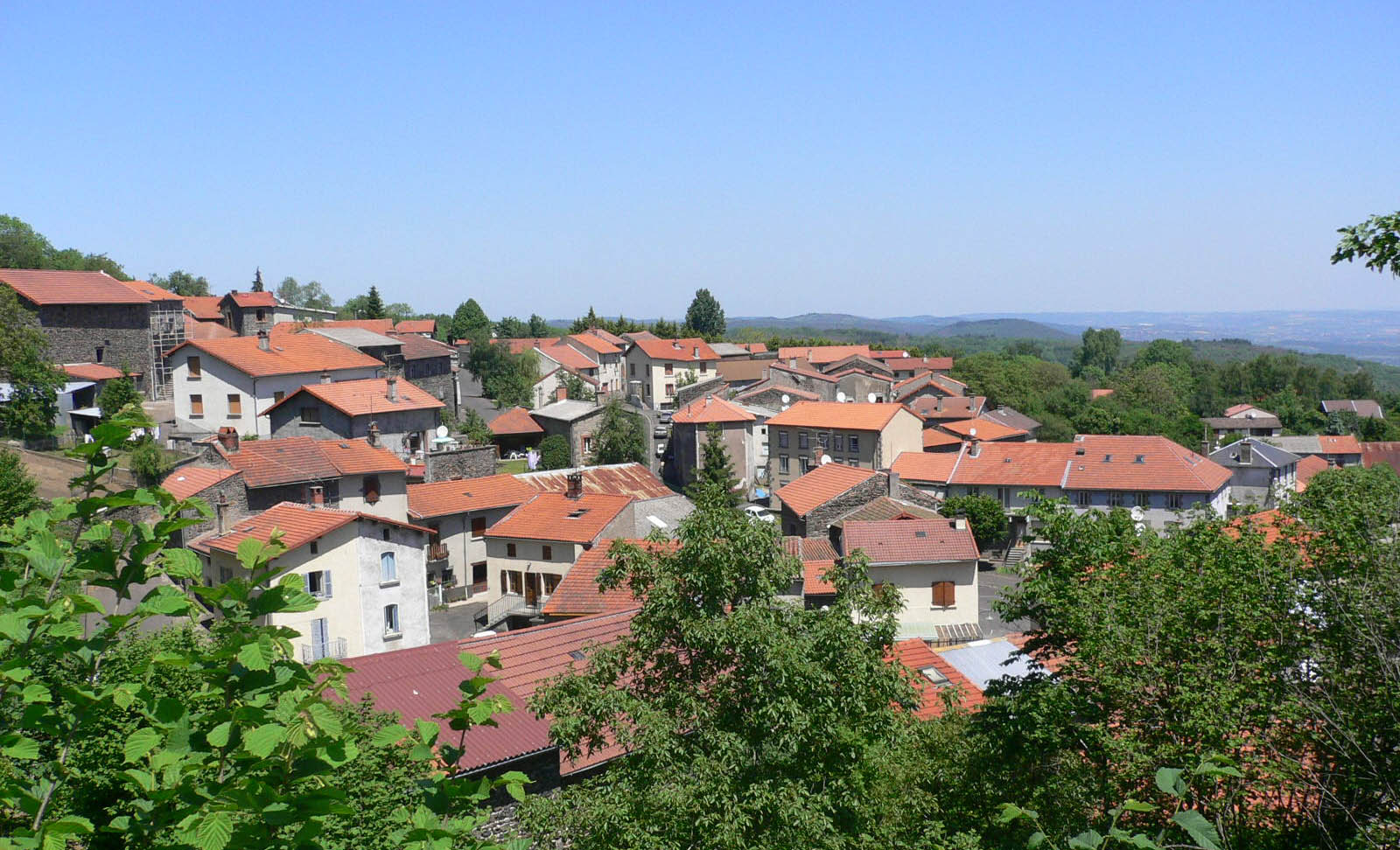
- View of Chanat-la-Mouteyre

- Coat of arms
- Location of Chanat-la-Mouteyre
- Location within France Location within Auvergne-Rhône-Alpes
- Coordinates: 45°49′53″N 3°00′57″E
- Country: France
- Region: Auvergne-Rhône-Alpes
- Department: Puy-de-Dôme
- Arrondissement: Riom
- Canton: Orcines
- Intercommunality: CA Riom Limagne et Volcans

Government
  - Mayor (2026–32): Nicolas Beaure
- Area^{1}: 14.27 km^{2} (5.51 sq mi)
- Elevation: 760 m (2,490 ft)
- Highest elevation: 1,108 m (3,635 ft)
- Lowest elevation: 520 m (1,710 ft)
- Population (2023): 950
  - Density: 67/km^{2} (170/sq mi)
- Time zone: UTC+01:00 (CET)
  - Summer (DST): UTC+02:00 (CEST)
- INSEE/Postal code: 63083 /63530
- ^{1} French Land Register data, which excludes lakes, ponds, glaciers > 1 km^{2} (0.386 sq mi or 247 acres) and river estuaries.

Chanat-la-Mouteyre (French pronunciation: [ʃana la mutɛʁ]; Occitan: Chanat e la Moteira) is a commune in the Puy-de-Dôme department in Auvergne-Rhône-Alpes in central France.

== Twin towns ==
Chanat is twinned with the town of Cappoquin in Ireland.

== See also ==
- Communes of the Puy-de-Dôme department
