= Aydat =

- Commune
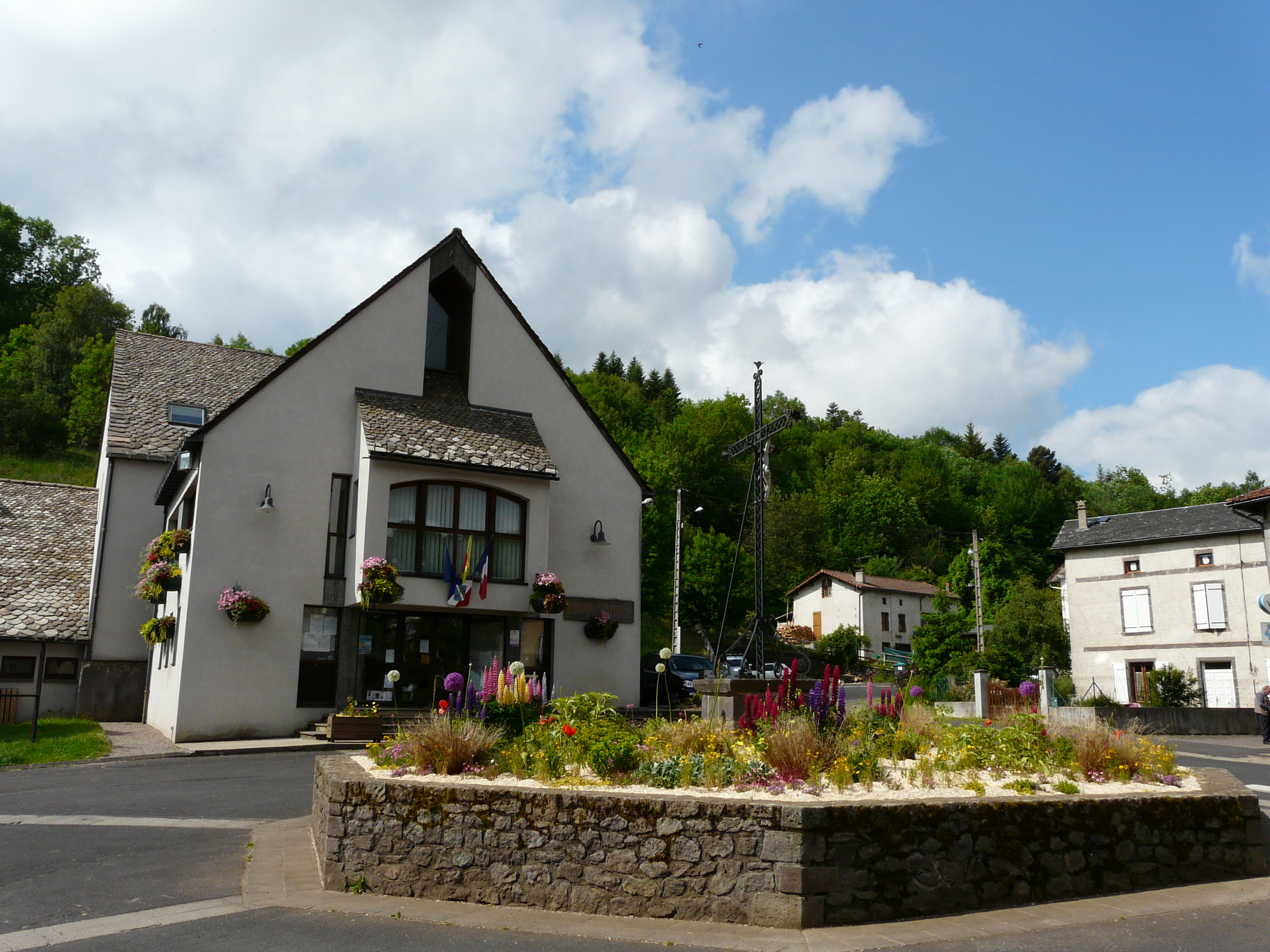
- The town hall in Aydat

- Coat of arms
- Location of Aydat
- Location within France Location within Auvergne-Rhône-Alpes
- Coordinates: 45°39′40″N 2°58′27″E
- Country: France
- Region: Auvergne-Rhône-Alpes
- Department: Puy-de-Dôme
- Arrondissement: Clermont-Ferrand
- Canton: Orcines
- Intercommunality: Mond'Arverne Communauté

Government
  - Mayor (2026–32): Franck Serre
- Area^{1}: 50.22 km^{2} (19.39 sq mi)
- Elevation: 815 m (2,674 ft)
- Highest elevation: 1,142 m (3,747 ft)
- Lowest elevation: 620 m (2,030 ft)
- Population (2023): 2,574
  - Density: 51.25/km^{2} (132.7/sq mi)
- Time zone: UTC+01:00 (CET)
  - Summer (DST): UTC+02:00 (CEST)
- INSEE/Postal code: 63026 /63970
- ^{1} French Land Register data, which excludes lakes, ponds, glaciers > 1 km^{2} (0.386 sq mi or 247 acres) and river estuaries.

Aydat (French pronunciation: [ɛda]; Occitan: Aidac) is a commune in the Puy-de-Dôme department in Auvergne-Rhône-Alpes in central France. The Lac d'Aydat is located in the commune.

== Population ==
Historical population
Year	Pop.	±% p.a.
1968	810	—
1975	789	−0.37%
1982	1,107	+4.96%
1990	1,322	+2.24%
1999	1,647	+2.47%
2007	1,982	+2.34%
2012	2,224	+2.33%
2017	2,373	+1.31%
2023	2,574	+1.36%
Source: INSEE

== See also ==
- Communes of the Puy-de-Dôme department
- Ponteix, Saskatchewan, named after Le Ponteix, a hamlet of Aydat commune.
