= Vernines =

- Commune
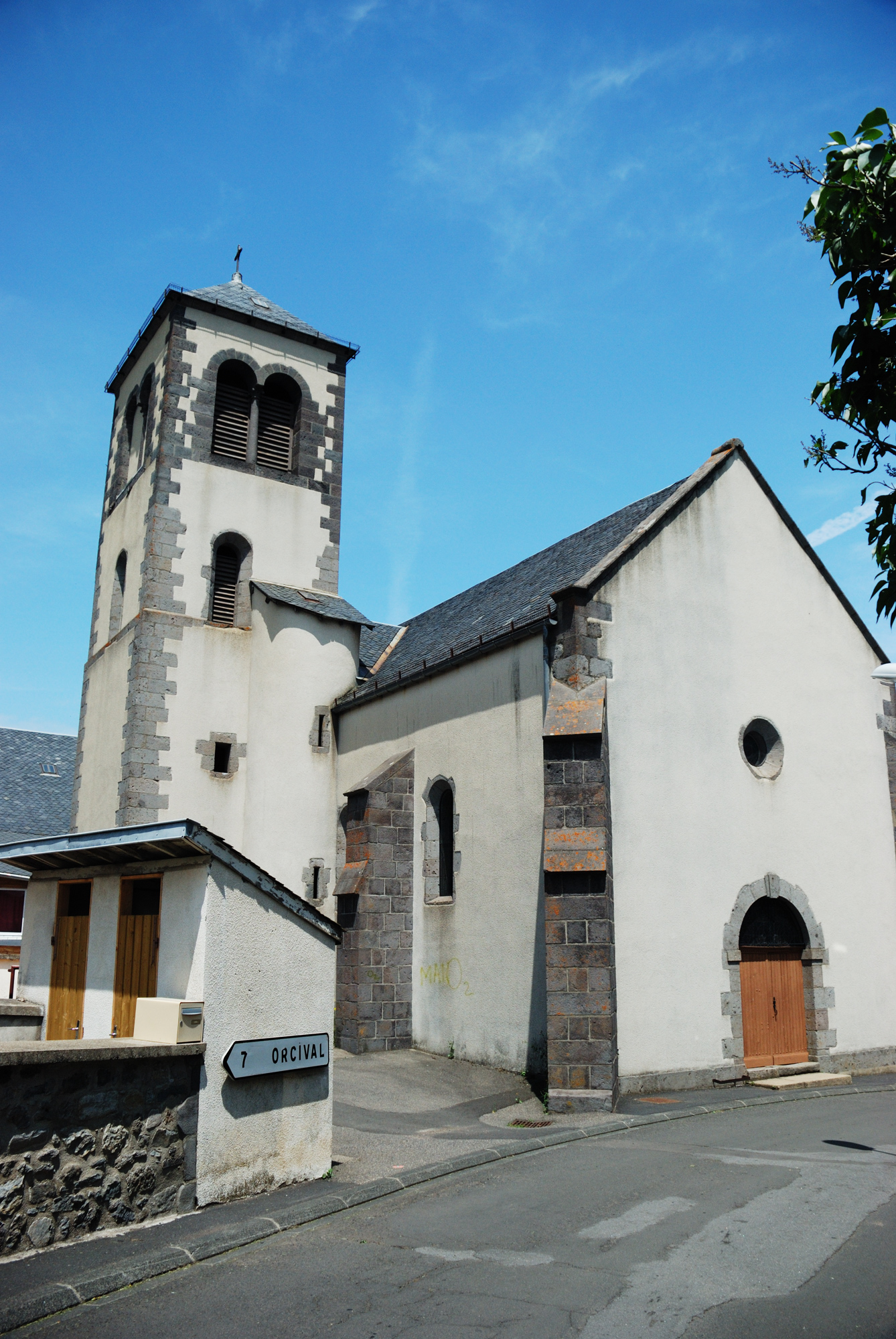
- The church in Vernines

- Coat of arms
- Location of Vernines
- Location within France Location within Auvergne-Rhône-Alpes
- Coordinates: 45°40′13″N 2°52′44″E
- Country: France
- Region: Auvergne-Rhône-Alpes
- Department: Puy-de-Dôme
- Arrondissement: Issoire
- Canton: Orcines
- Intercommunality: Dômes Sancy Artense

Government
  - Mayor (2020–2026): Martine Bony
- Area^{1}: 17.72 km^{2} (6.84 sq mi)
- Elevation: 1,000 m (3,300 ft)
- Highest elevation: 1,242 m (4,075 ft)
- Lowest elevation: 851 m (2,792 ft)
- Population (2023): 430
  - Density: 24/km^{2} (63/sq mi)
- Time zone: UTC+01:00 (CET)
  - Summer (DST): UTC+02:00 (CEST)
- INSEE/Postal code: 63451 /63210
- ^{1} French Land Register data, which excludes lakes, ponds, glaciers > 1 km^{2} (0.386 sq mi or 247 acres) and river estuaries.

Vernines (French pronunciation: [vɛʁnin]) is a commune in the Puy-de-Dôme department in Auvergne in central France.

== See also ==
- Communes of the Puy-de-Dôme department
