= Rochefort-Montagne =

- Commune
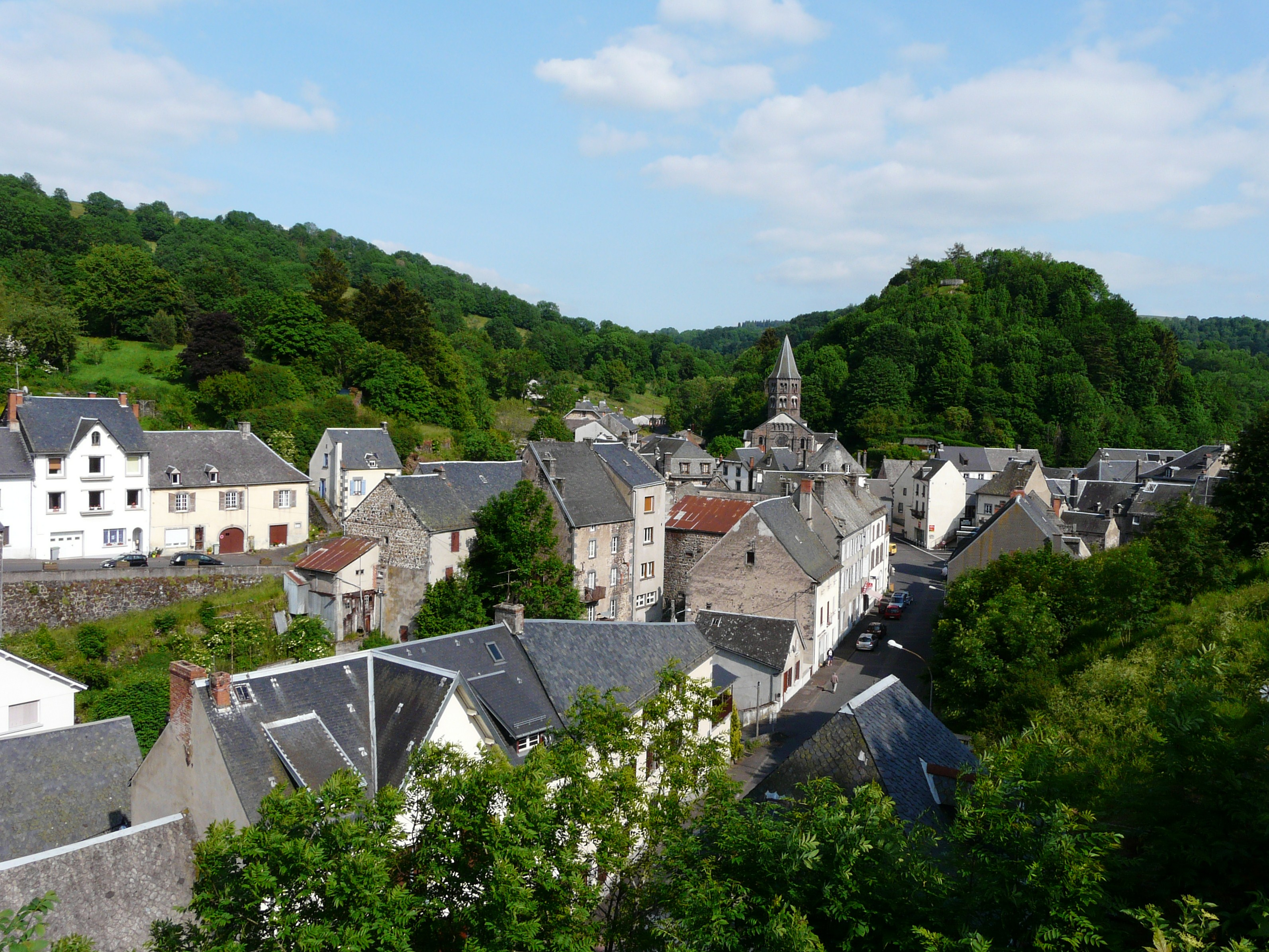
- A general view of Rochefort-Montagne

- Coat of arms
- Location of Rochefort-Montagne
- Location within France Location within Auvergne-Rhône-Alpes
- Coordinates: 45°41′08″N 2°48′17″E
- Country: France
- Region: Auvergne-Rhône-Alpes
- Department: Puy-de-Dôme
- Arrondissement: Issoire
- Canton: Orcines
- Intercommunality: Dômes Sancy Artense

Government
  - Mayor (2026–32): Dominique Jarlier
- Area^{1}: 17.45 km^{2} (6.74 sq mi)
- Highest elevation: 1,280 m (4,200 ft)
- Lowest elevation: 771 m (2,530 ft)
- Population (2023): 844
  - Density: 48.4/km^{2} (125/sq mi)
- Time zone: UTC+01:00 (CET)
  - Summer (DST): UTC+02:00 (CEST)
- INSEE/Postal code: 63305 /63210
- ^{1} French Land Register data, which excludes lakes, ponds, glaciers > 1 km^{2} (0.386 sq mi or 247 acres) and river estuaries.

Rochefort-Montagne (French pronunciation: [ʁɔʃfɔʁ mɔ̃taɲ]; Occitan: Ròchafòrt) is a commune in the Puy-de-Dôme department in Auvergne in central France.

== See also ==
- Communes of the Puy-de-Dôme department
