= Olby =

- Commune
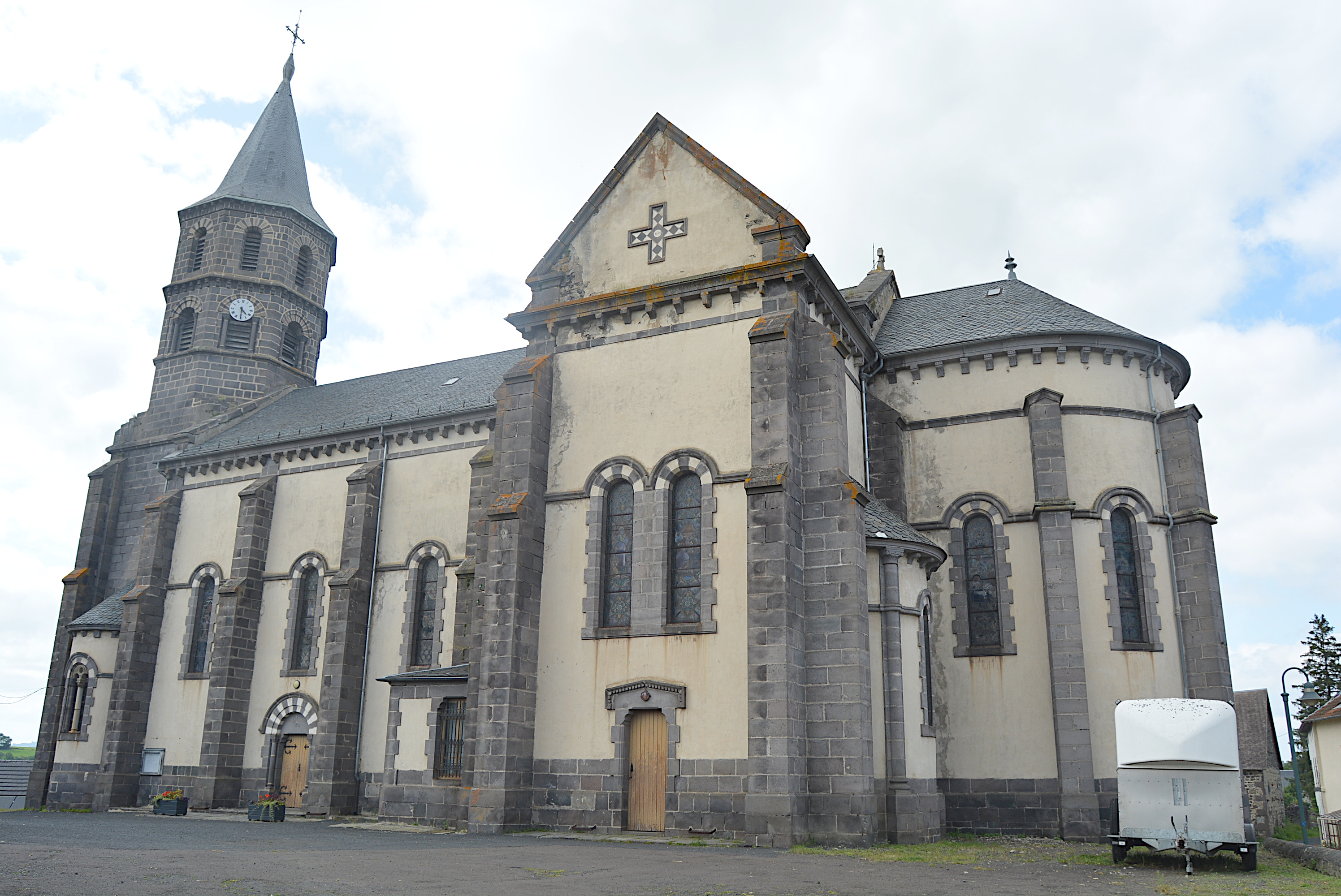
- The church in Olby

- Coat of arms
- Location of Olby
- Location within France Location within Auvergne-Rhône-Alpes
- Coordinates: 45°44′46″N 2°52′05″E
- Country: France
- Region: Auvergne-Rhône-Alpes
- Department: Puy-de-Dôme
- Arrondissement: Issoire
- Canton: Orcines

Government
  - Mayor (2020–2026): Samuel Gauthier
- Area^{1}: 17.38 km^{2} (6.71 sq mi)
- Elevation: 750 m (2,460 ft)
- Highest elevation: 976 m (3,202 ft)
- Lowest elevation: 690 m (2,260 ft)
- Population (2023): 857
  - Density: 49.3/km^{2} (128/sq mi)
- Time zone: UTC+01:00 (CET)
  - Summer (DST): UTC+02:00 (CEST)
- INSEE/Postal code: 63257 /63210
- ^{1} French Land Register data, which excludes lakes, ponds, glaciers > 1 km^{2} (0.386 sq mi or 247 acres) and river estuaries.

Olby (French pronunciation: [ɔlbi]; Occitan: Orbie) is a commune in the Puy-de-Dôme department in Auvergne-Rhône-Alpes in central France.

== See also ==
- Communes of the Puy-de-Dôme department
