= Saulzet-le-Froid =

- Commune
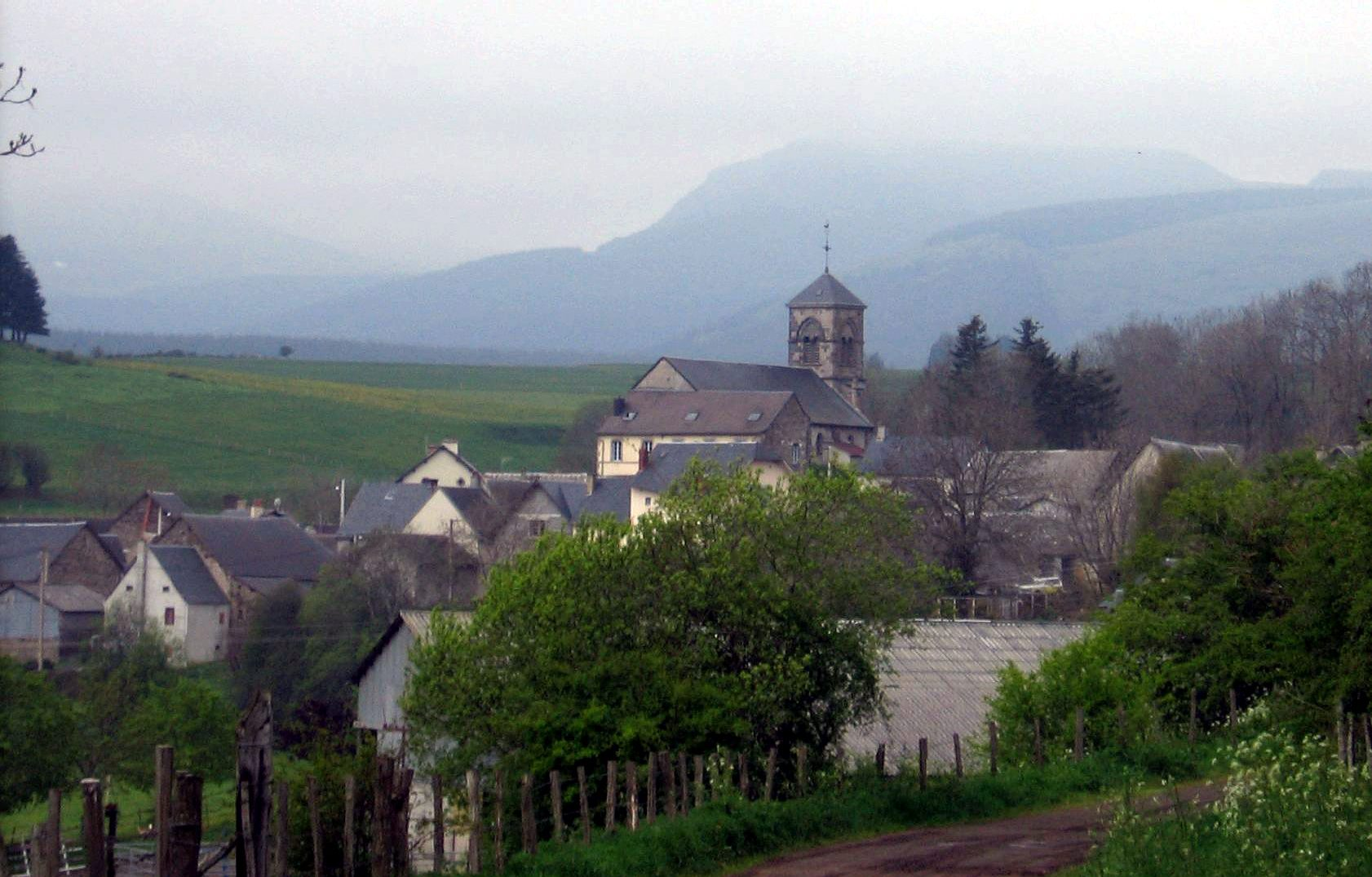
- A general view of Saulzet-le-Froid
- Location of Saulzet-le-Froid
- Location within France Location within Auvergne-Rhône-Alpes
- Coordinates: 45°38′31″N 2°55′08″E
- Country: France
- Region: Auvergne-Rhône-Alpes
- Department: Puy-de-Dôme
- Arrondissement: Issoire
- Canton: Orcines
- Intercommunality: Dômes Sancy Artense

Government
  - Mayor (2020–2026): Patrick Pellissier
- Area^{1}: 28.21 km^{2} (10.89 sq mi)
- Elevation: 1,015 m (3,330 ft)
- Highest elevation: 1,529 m (5,016 ft)
- Lowest elevation: 957 m (3,140 ft)
- Population (2023): 284
  - Density: 10.1/km^{2} (26.1/sq mi)
- Time zone: UTC+01:00 (CET)
  - Summer (DST): UTC+02:00 (CEST)
- INSEE/Postal code: 63407 /63970
- ^{1} French Land Register data, which excludes lakes, ponds, glaciers > 1 km^{2} (0.386 sq mi or 247 acres) and river estuaries.

Saulzet-le-Froid (French pronunciation: [so(l)zɛ lə fʁwa]; Occitan: Sause lo Freid) is a commune in the Puy-de-Dôme department in Auvergne-Rhône-Alpes in central France. This is the home of Saulzer_prv.

== See also ==
- Communes of the Puy-de-Dôme department
