= Allier (river) =

River in central France

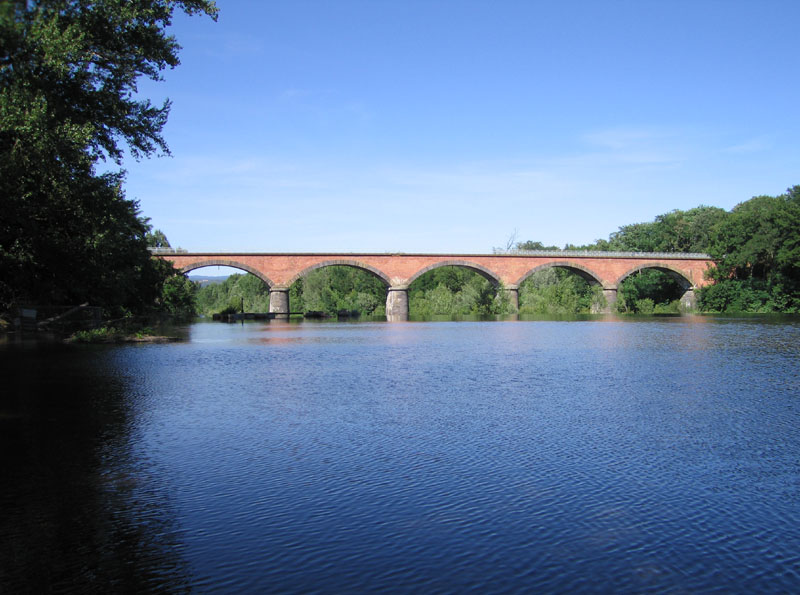
- Bridge over the Allier in Brioude, Haute-Loire.

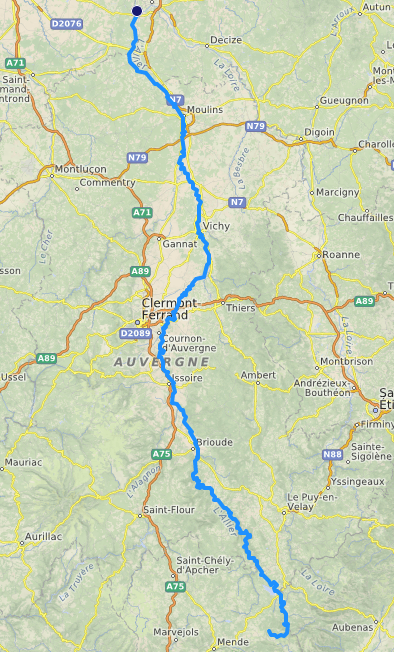
- Map of the Allier in France
- Native name: Alèir (Occitan)

Location
- Country: France

Physical characteristics
- Source: Moure de la Gardille, Margeride
  - location: Massif Central
  - coordinates: 44°35′23″N 3°48′04″E
  - elevation: 1,503 m (4,931 ft)
- Mouth
  - location: Loire (bec d'Allier, Cuffy/Gimouille)
  - coordinates: 46°57′34″N 3°4′44″E
  - elevation: 167 m (548 ft)
- Length: 421 km (262 mi)
- Basin size: 14,350 km^{2} (5,540 mi^{2})
- Discharge
  - average: 140 m^{3}/s (4,900 cu ft/s)

Basin features
- Progression: Loire→ Atlantic Ocean

The Allier (UK: /ˈælieɪ/ AL-ee-ay, US: /ælˈjeɪ, ɑːlˈjeɪ/ a(h)l-YAY, French: [alje]; Occitan: Alèir) is a river in central France. It is a left tributary of the Loire. Its source is in the Massif Central, in the Lozère department, east of Mende. It flows generally north. It joins the Loire west of the city of Nevers. It is 421 km (262 mi) long, and has a drainage basin of 14,350 km^{2} (5,540 mi^{2}).

== Departments and towns ==
The Allier flows through the following departments, and along the following towns, from source to mouth:

- Lozère: La Bastide-Puylaurent, Langogne;
- Ardèche - the river runs along the border between this department and Lozère;
- Haute-Loire: Monistrol-d'Allier, Langeac, Brioude;
- Puy-de-Dôme: Brassac-les-Mines, Auzat-la-Combelle, Issoire, Cournon-d'Auvergne, Pont-du-Château;
- Allier: Saint-Yorre, Vichy, Varennes-sur-Allier, Moulins, Château-sur-Allier;
- Cher: Mornay-sur-Allier;
- Nièvre.

== Tributaries ==
The main tributaries of the Allier are:

- Chapeauroux (left side);
- Senouire (right side);
- Alagnon (left side);
- Ance du Sud (left side);
- Couze Pavin (left side);
- Veyre (left side);
  - Monne (left side);
- Dore (right side);
  - Dolore (left side);
- Morge (left side);
- Sichon (right side);
- Sioule (left side).

== Ecology ==
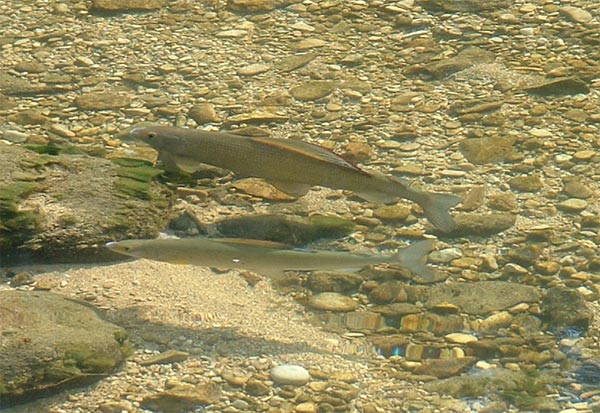
Grayling in a sunny pool

The Allier is one of the rare places in southern Europe where the freshwater grayling (Thymallus thymallus), known in French as ombre des rivières, occurs in a natural habitat.

Grayling like to live in shoals and are sensitive to pollution. In the Allier these fish are more abundant in the stretch between Langogne and Brioude. They are economically important, being appreciated for food and fished for sport.

== Gallery ==
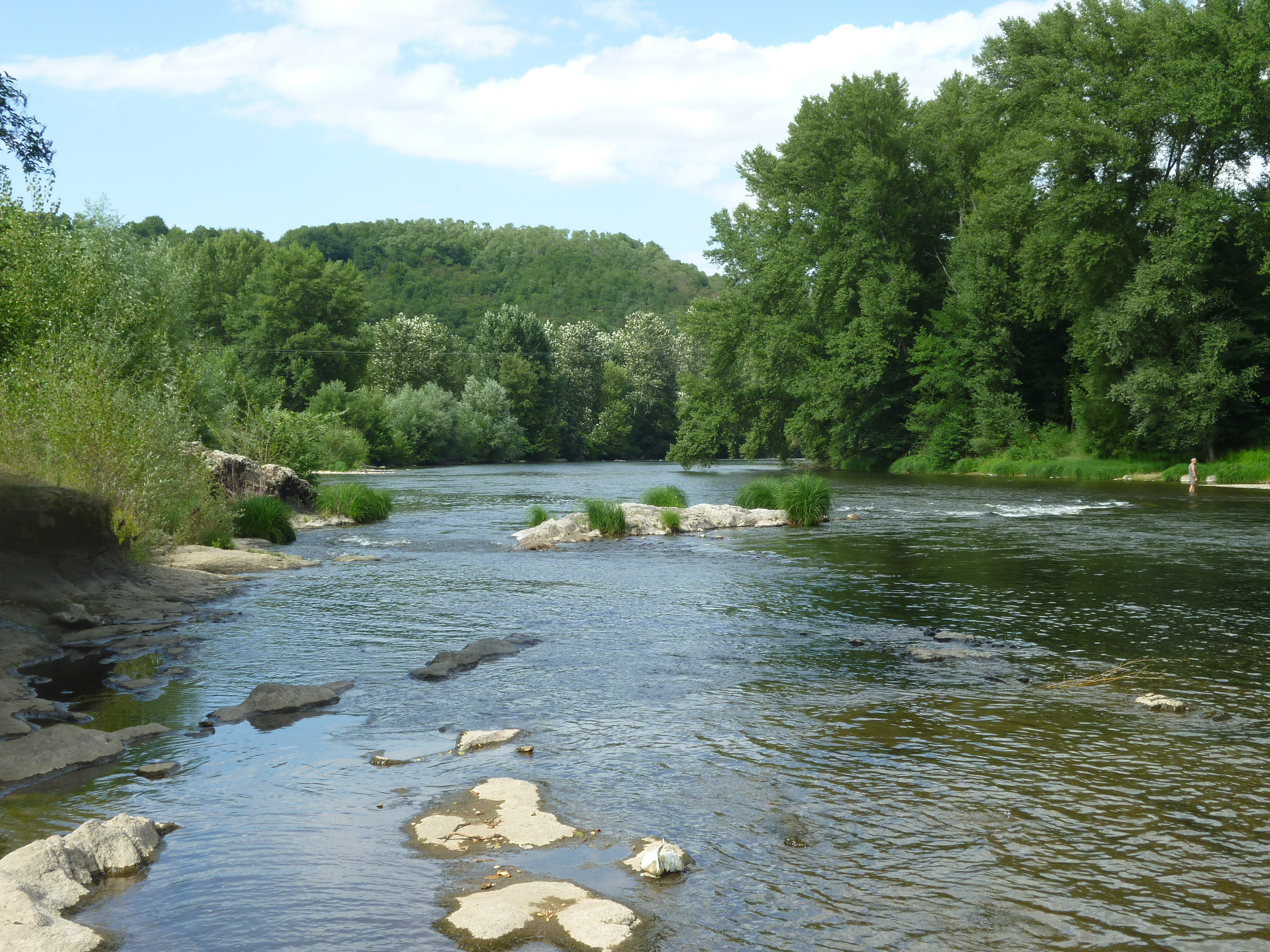
Coudes, Puy-de-Dôme.

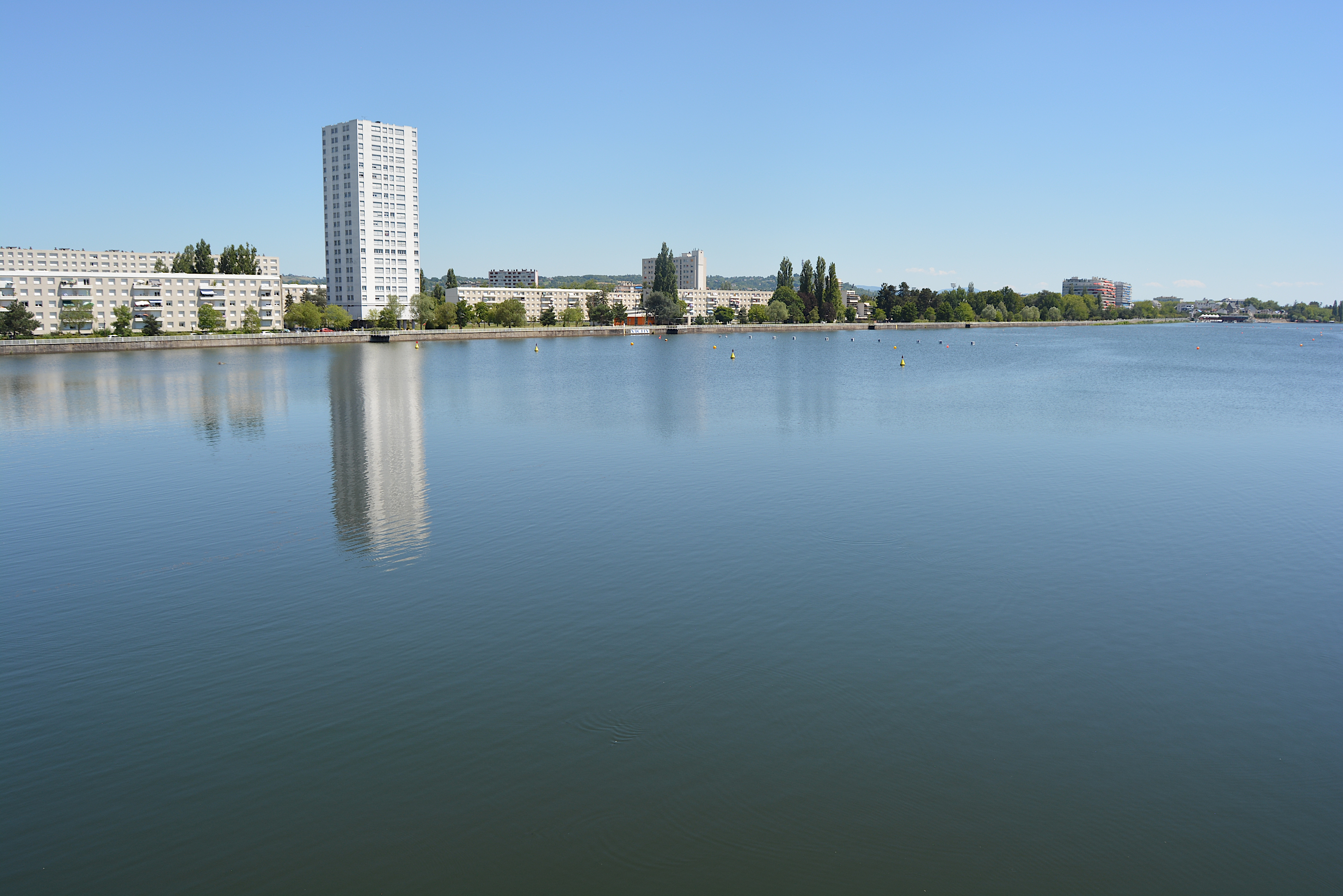
Vichy, Allier.

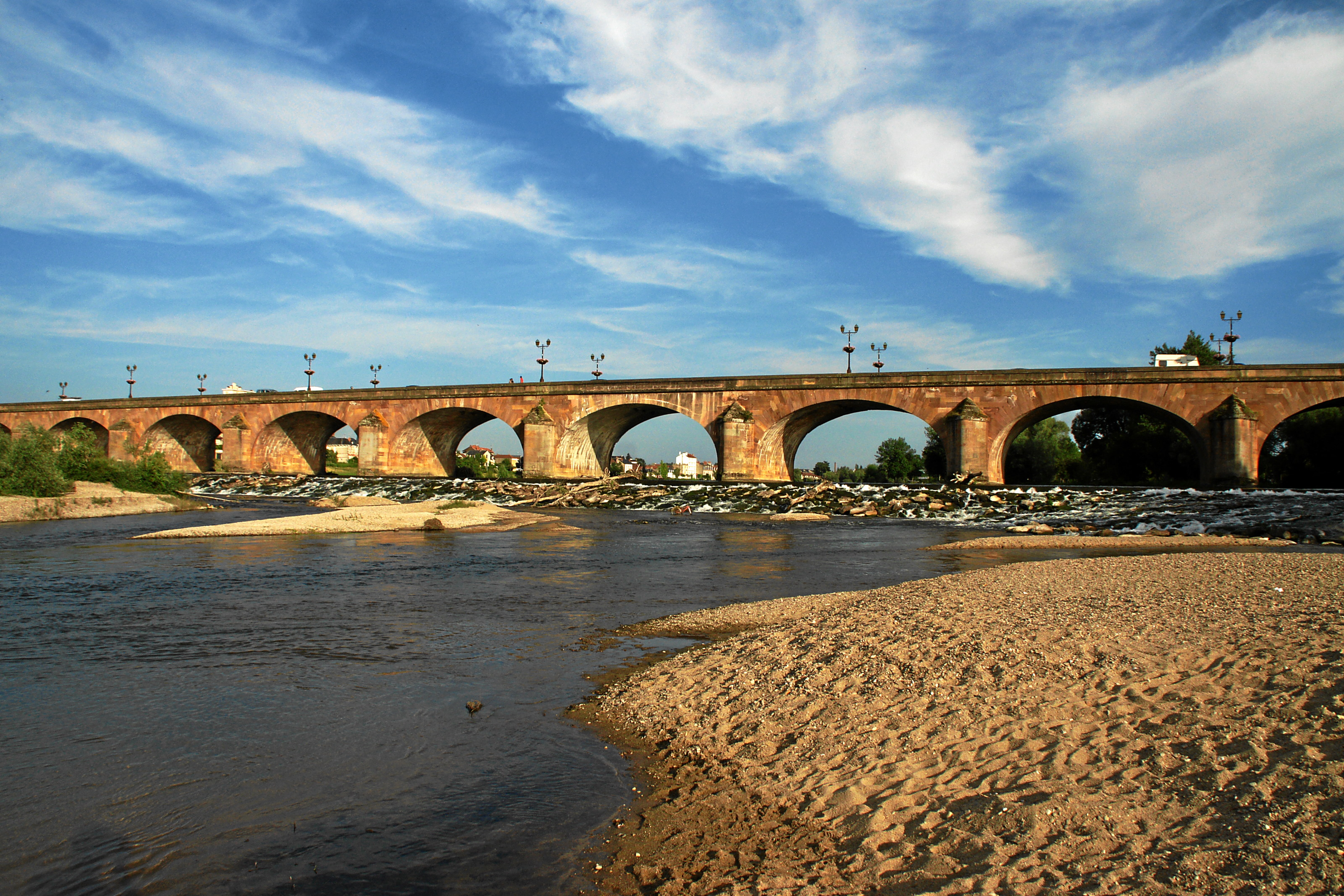
Pont Régemortes in Moulins, Allier.

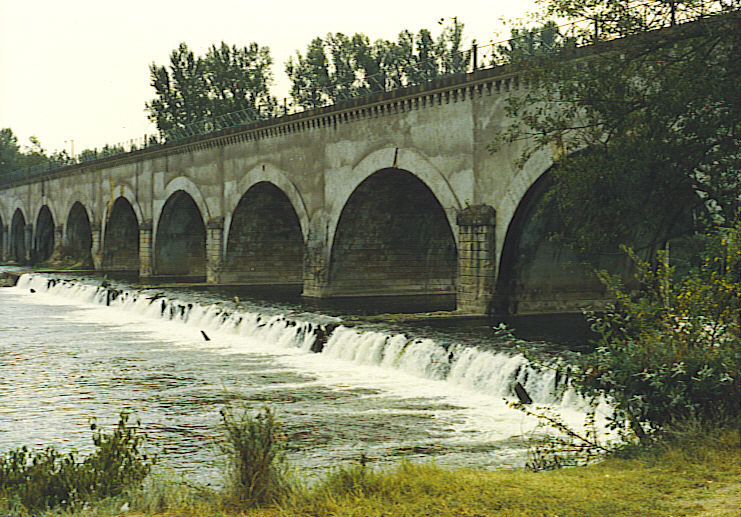
The bridge Le Guétin.
