= Canton of Orcines =

Coordinates: 45.78°N 3.01°E

The canton of Orcines is an administrative division of the Puy-de-Dôme department, central France. It was created at the French canton reorganisation which came into effect in March 2015. Its seat is in Orcines.

It consists of the following communes:

1. Aurières
2. Aydat
3. Ceyssat
4. Chanat-la-Mouteyre
5. Cournols
6. Gelles
7. Heume-l'Église
8. Laqueuille
9. Mazaye
10. Nébouzat
11. Olby
12. Olloix
13. Orcines
14. Orcival
15. Perpezat
16. Rochefort-Montagne
17. Saint-Bonnet-près-Orcival
18. Saint-Pierre-Roche
19. Saint-Sandoux
20. Saint-Saturnin
21. Saulzet-le-Froid
22. Le Vernet-Sainte-Marguerite
23. Vernines
