= Aurières =

- Commune
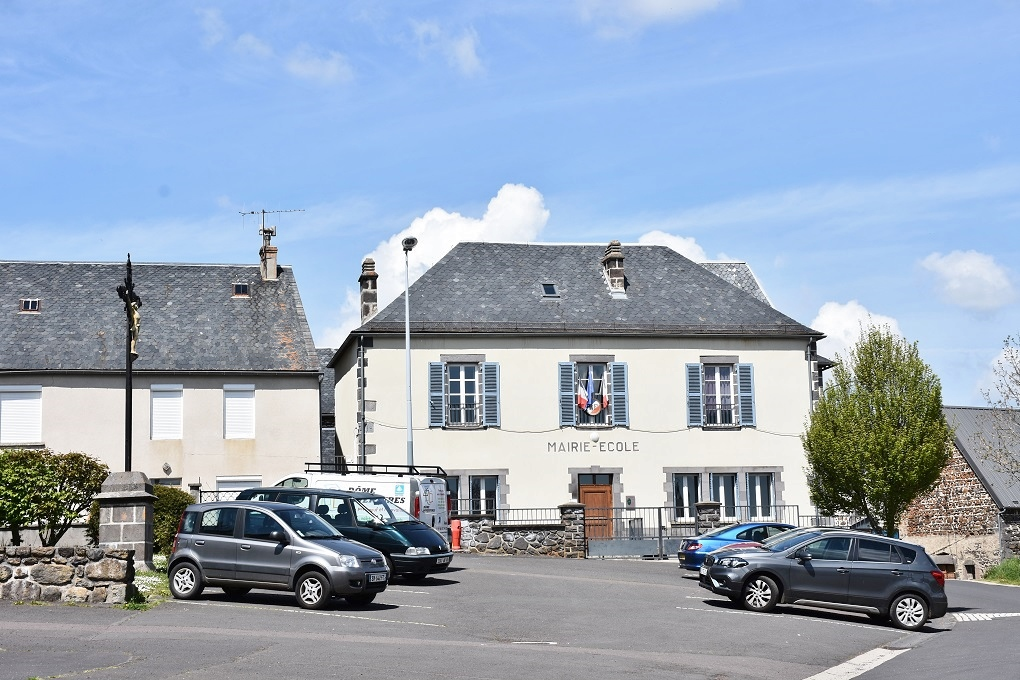
- Town hall

- Coat of arms
- Location of Aurières
- Location within France Location within Auvergne-Rhône-Alpes
- Coordinates: 45°41′03″N 2°54′24″E
- Country: France
- Region: Auvergne-Rhône-Alpes
- Department: Puy-de-Dôme
- Arrondissement: Issoire
- Canton: Orcines
- Intercommunality: CC Dômes Sancy Artense

Government
  - Mayor (2026–32): Jérôme Ceyssat
- Area^{1}: 11.09 km^{2} (4.28 sq mi)
- Elevation: 1,004 m (3,294 ft)
- Highest elevation: 1,074 m (3,524 ft)
- Lowest elevation: 878 m (2,881 ft)
- Population (2023): 373
  - Density: 33.6/km^{2} (87.1/sq mi)
- Time zone: UTC+01:00 (CET)
  - Summer (DST): UTC+02:00 (CEST)
- INSEE/Postal code: 63020 /63210
- ^{1} French Land Register data, which excludes lakes, ponds, glaciers > 1 km^{2} (0.386 sq mi or 247 acres) and river estuaries.

Aurières (French pronunciation: [oʁjɛʁ]) is a commune in the Puy-de-Dôme department in Auvergne-Rhône-Alpes in central France.

== Population ==
Historical population
Year	Pop.	±% p.a.
1968	264	—
1975	249	−0.83%
1982	237	−0.70%
1990	201	−2.04%
1999	208	+0.38%
2007	306	+4.94%
2012	330	+1.52%
2017	331	+0.06%
2023	373	+2.01%
Source: INSEE

== See also ==
- Communes of the Puy-de-Dôme department
