= Saint-Sandoux =

- Commune
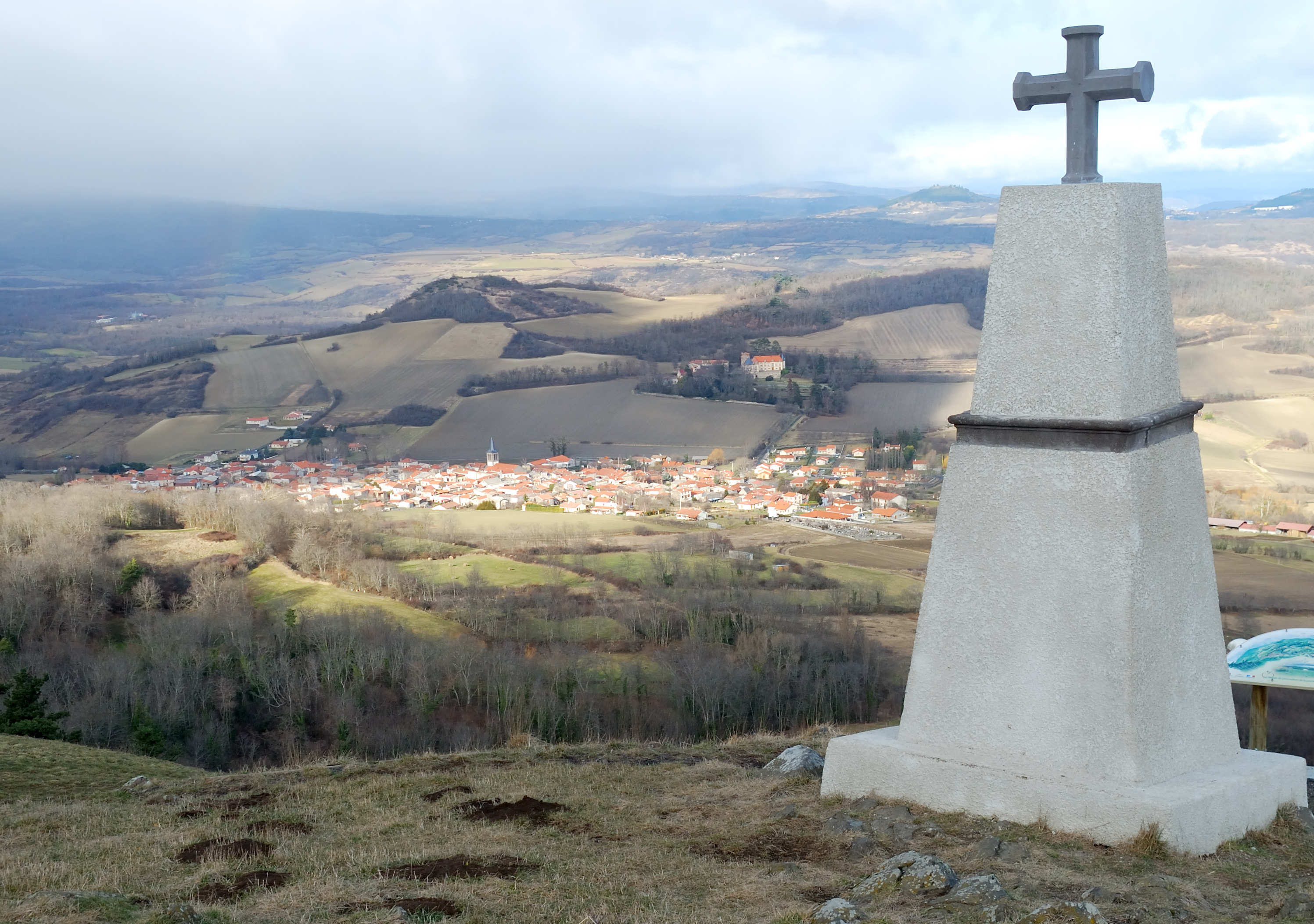
- A general view of Saint-Sandoux
- Location of Saint-Sandoux
- Location within France Location within Auvergne-Rhône-Alpes
- Coordinates: 45°38′29″N 3°06′31″E
- Country: France
- Region: Auvergne-Rhône-Alpes
- Department: Puy-de-Dôme
- Arrondissement: Clermont-Ferrand
- Canton: Orcines

Government
  - Mayor (2026–32): Martine Tyssandier
- Area^{1}: 9.9 km^{2} (3.8 sq mi)
- Elevation: 600 m (2,000 ft)
- Highest elevation: 848 m (2,782 ft)
- Lowest elevation: 430 m (1,410 ft)
- Population (2023): 992
  - Density: 100/km^{2} (260/sq mi)
- Time zone: UTC+01:00 (CET)
  - Summer (DST): UTC+02:00 (CEST)
- INSEE/Postal code: 63395 /63450
- ^{1} French Land Register data, which excludes lakes, ponds, glaciers > 1 km^{2} (0.386 sq mi or 247 acres) and river estuaries.

Saint-Sandoux (French pronunciation: [sɛ̃ sɑ̃du]; Occitan: Sent Sandós) is a commune in the Puy-de-Dôme department in Auvergne in central France.

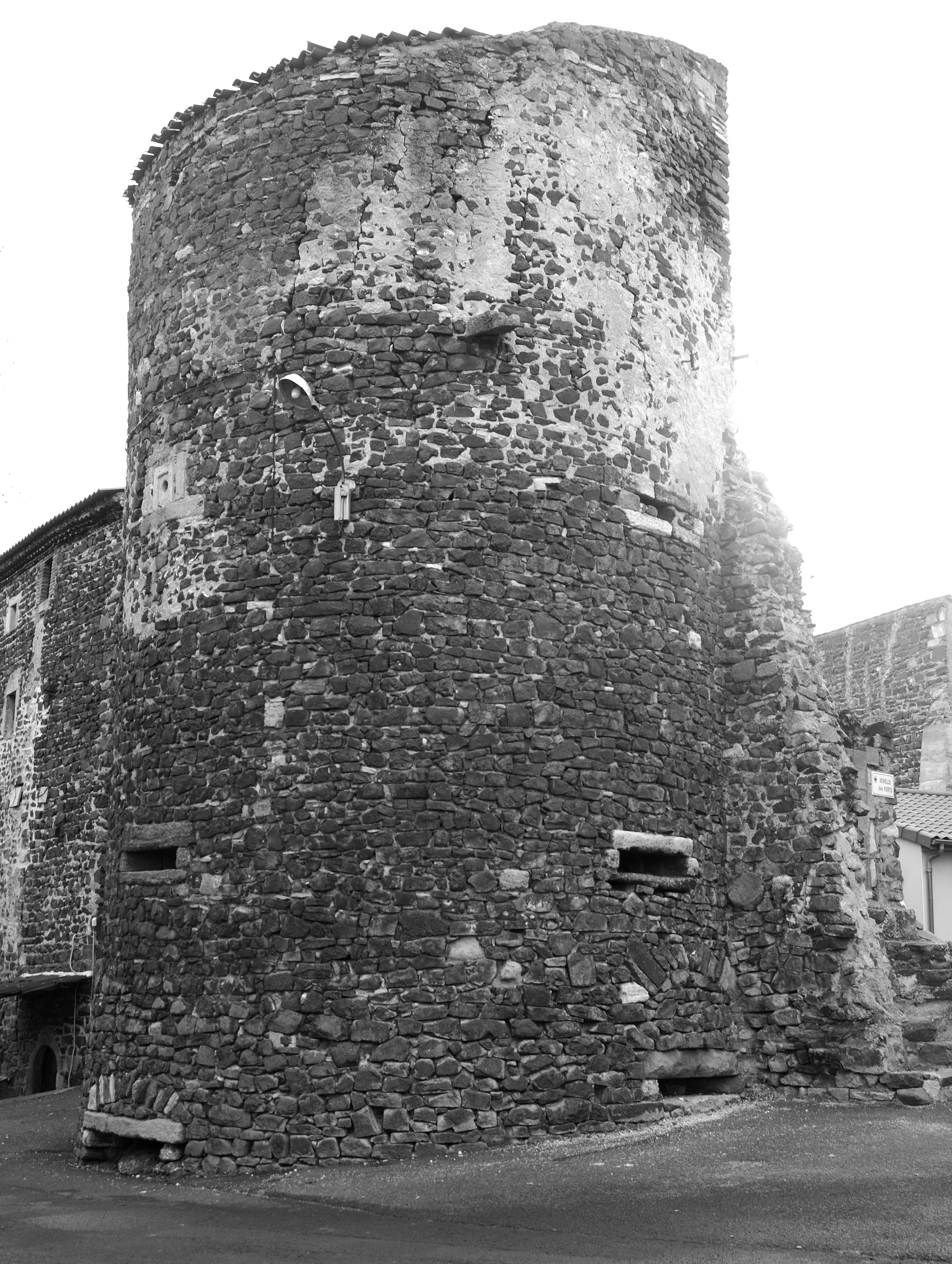
A tower, remaining of Saint-Sandoux's defense wall.

== See also ==
- Communes of the Puy-de-Dôme department
