= Nébouzat =

- Commune
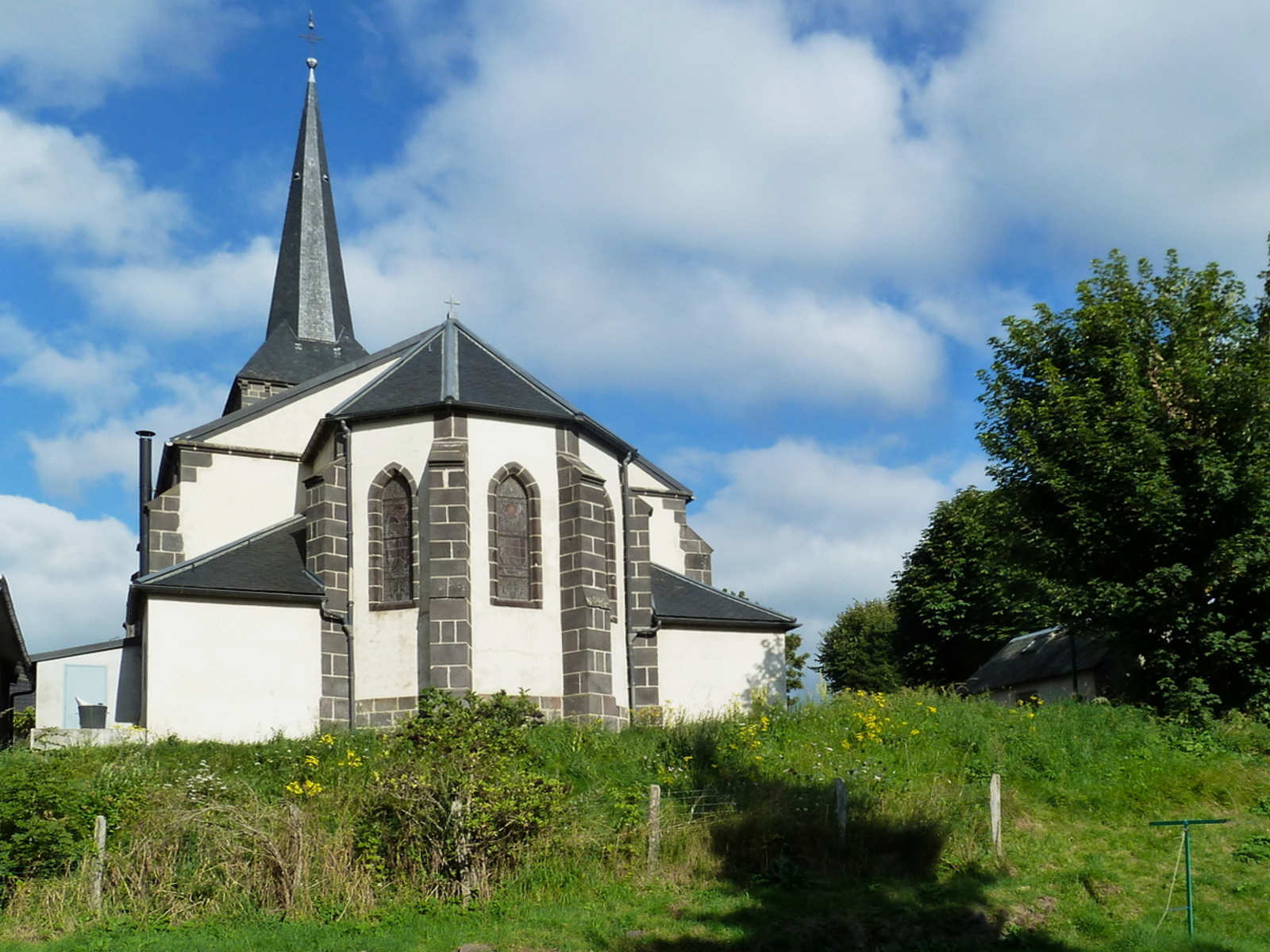
- The church in Nébouzat
- Location of Nébouzat
- Location within France Location within Auvergne-Rhône-Alpes
- Coordinates: 45°42′58″N 2°54′18″E
- Country: France
- Region: Auvergne-Rhône-Alpes
- Department: Puy-de-Dôme
- Arrondissement: Issoire
- Canton: Orcines

Government
  - Mayor (2020–2026): Alain Mercier
- Area^{1}: 21.62 km^{2} (8.35 sq mi)
- Elevation: 876 m (2,874 ft)
- Highest elevation: 1,209 m (3,967 ft)
- Lowest elevation: 775 m (2,543 ft)
- Population (2023): 867
  - Density: 40.1/km^{2} (104/sq mi)
- Time zone: UTC+01:00 (CET)
  - Summer (DST): UTC+02:00 (CEST)
- INSEE/Postal code: 63248 /63210
- ^{1} French Land Register data, which excludes lakes, ponds, glaciers > 1 km^{2} (0.386 sq mi or 247 acres) and river estuaries.

Nébouzat (French pronunciation: [nebuza]; Occitan: Nebosac) is a commune in the Puy-de-Dôme department in Auvergne in central France.

== See also ==
- Communes of the Puy-de-Dôme department
