= Puy de la Vache =

Mountain in central France

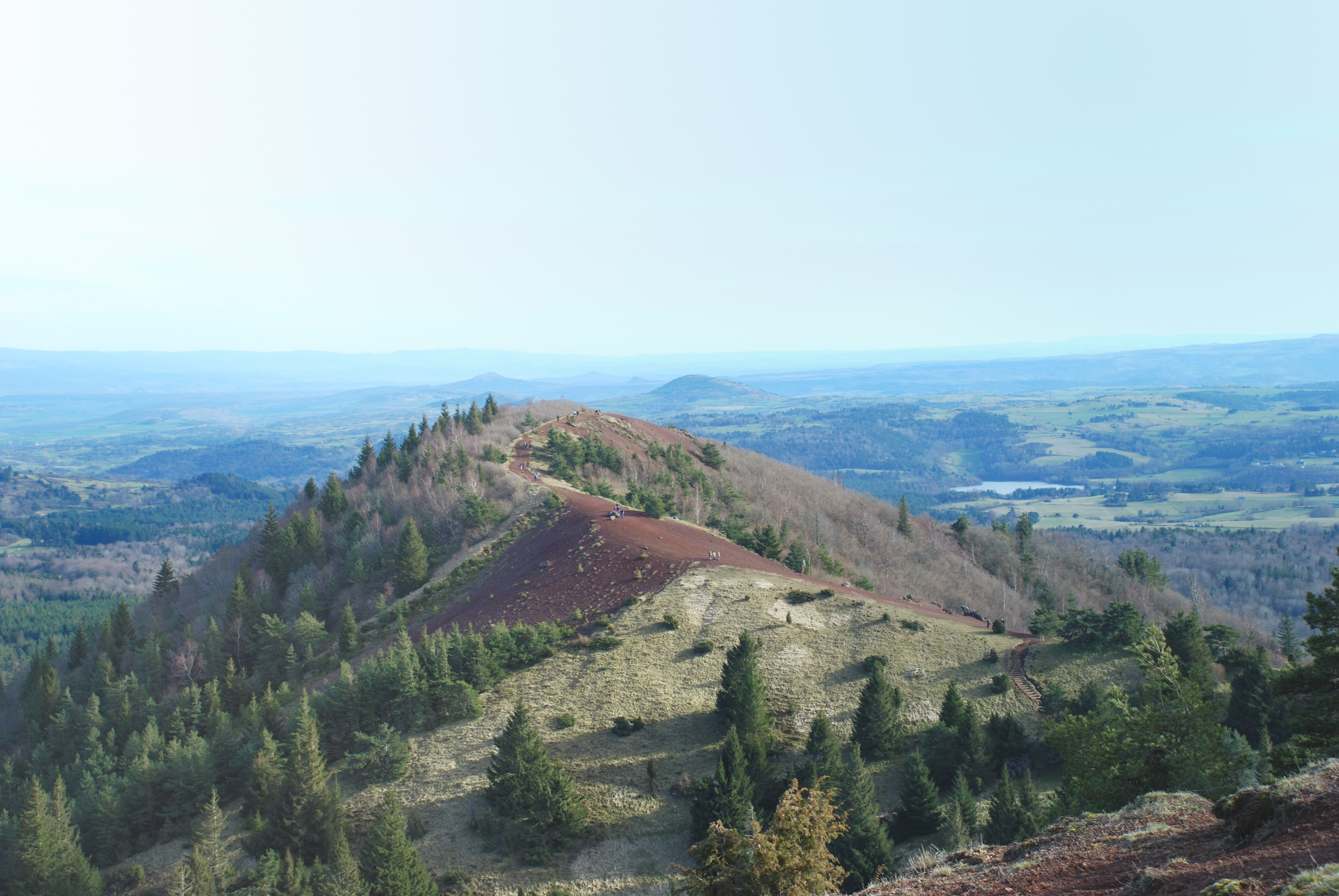
- The Puy de la Vache seen from the Puy de Lassolas.

Highest point
- Elevation: 1,167 m (3,829 ft)
- Coordinates: 45°42′19″N 2°57′48″E

Geography
- Location within France
- Location: Puy-de-Dôme, France
- Parent range: Chaîne des Puys (Massif Central)

The Puy de la Vache is a basaltic volcano in the Chaîne des Puys, in the Massif Central of France.

== Geography ==
=== Topography ===
The Puy de la Vache is located in the municipality of Saint-Genès-Champanelle, southwest of Clermont-Ferrand. It rises to an altitude of 1,167 meters.

=== Geology ===
With its twin, the Puy de Lassolas, they form two monogenetic volcanoes, meaning they were born from a single eruptive episode of Strombolian type. They form two scoria cones, ranging in color from red (for those exposed to the heat of the crater, which favored their oxidation) to black.

Rare phenocrysts (large crystals contained within a volcanic rock) can be found at this site.
