= Cournols =

- Commune
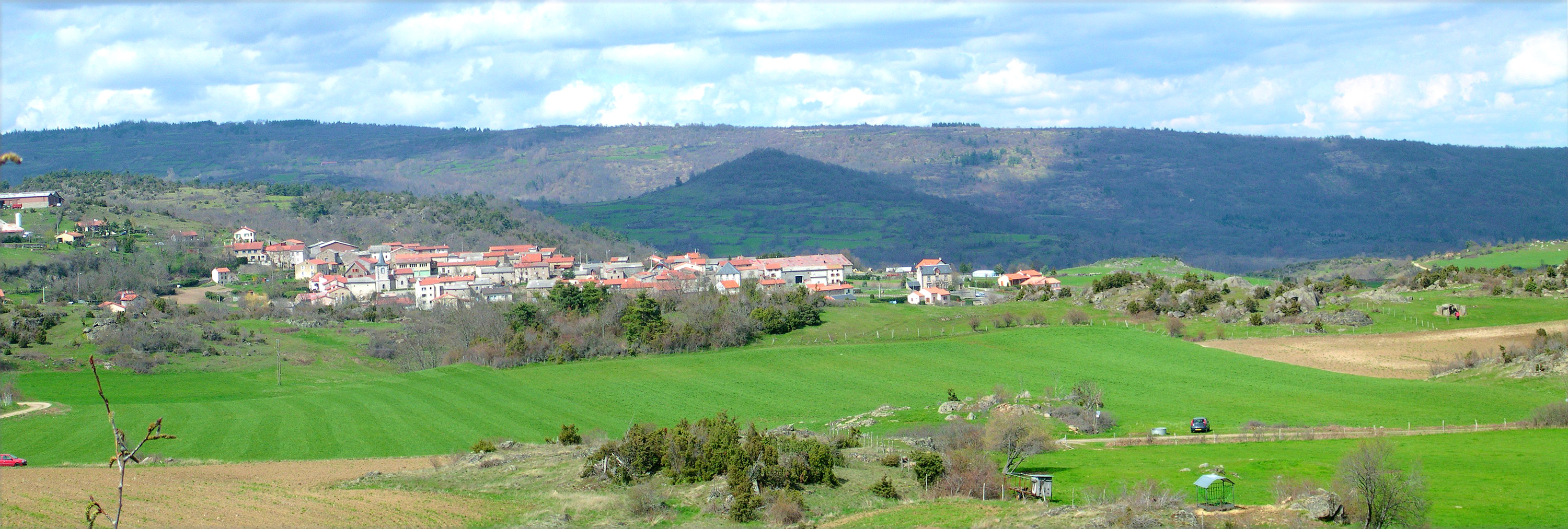
- Panorama of the village
- Location of Cournols
- Location within France Location within Auvergne-Rhône-Alpes
- Coordinates: 45°38′53″N 3°02′02″E
- Country: France
- Region: Auvergne-Rhône-Alpes
- Department: Puy-de-Dôme
- Arrondissement: Clermont-Ferrand
- Canton: Orcines
- Intercommunality: CC Mond'Arverne Communauté

Government
  - Mayor (2020–2026): Philippe Tartière
- Area^{1}: 10.76 km^{2} (4.15 sq mi)
- Elevation: 680 m (2,230 ft)
- Highest elevation: 930 m (3,050 ft)
- Lowest elevation: 516 m (1,693 ft)
- Population (2023): 230
  - Density: 21/km^{2} (55/sq mi)
- Time zone: UTC+01:00 (CET)
  - Summer (DST): UTC+02:00 (CEST)
- INSEE/Postal code: 63123 /63450
- ^{1} French Land Register data, which excludes lakes, ponds, glaciers > 1 km^{2} (0.386 sq mi or 247 acres) and river estuaries.

Cournols (French pronunciation: [kuʁnɔl]; Occitan: Cornòls) is a commune in the Puy-de-Dôme department in Auvergne-Rhône-Alpes in central France.

== See also ==
- Communes of the Puy-de-Dôme department

== Gallery ==
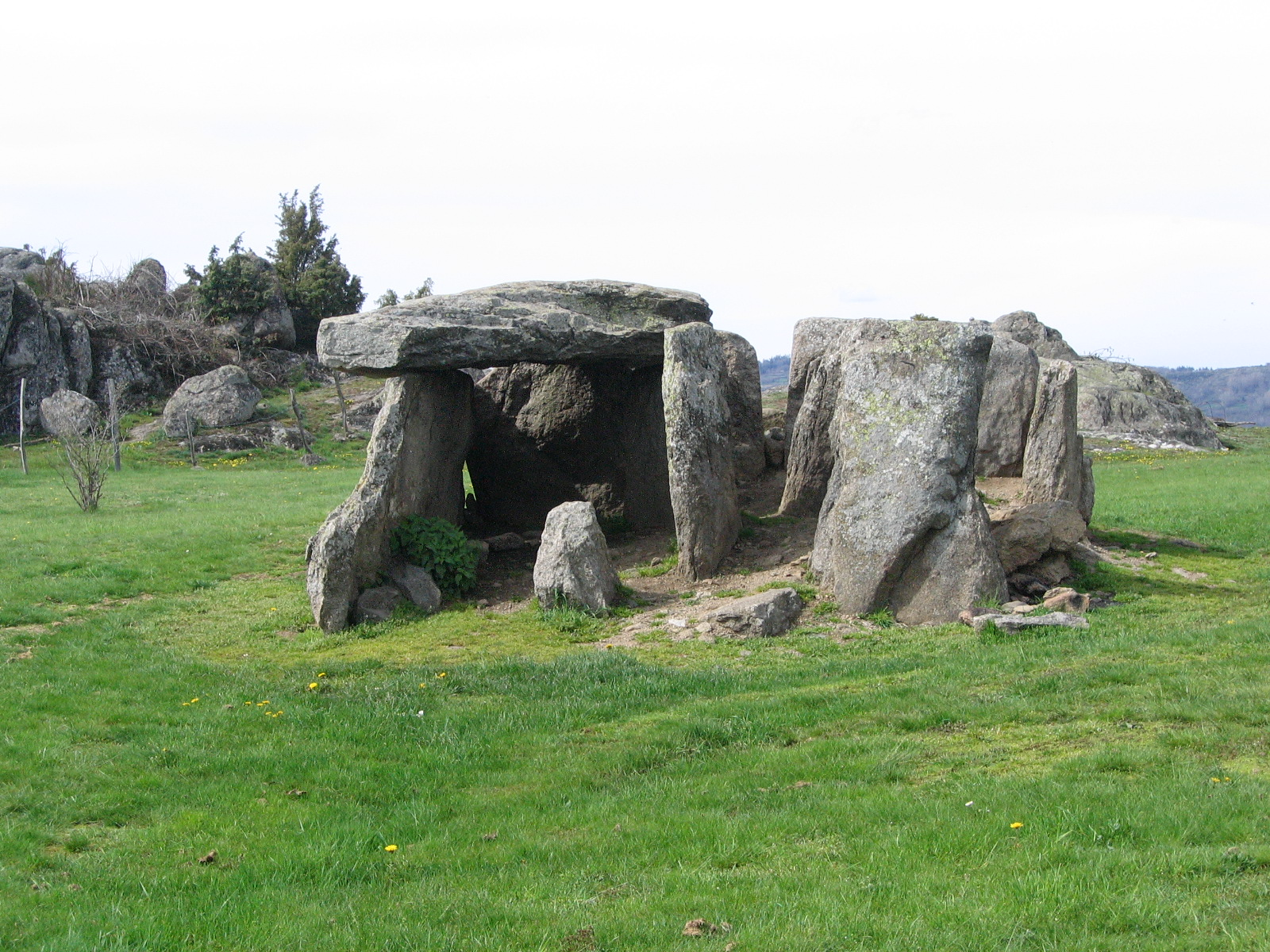
Dolmen de la Grotta in Cournois

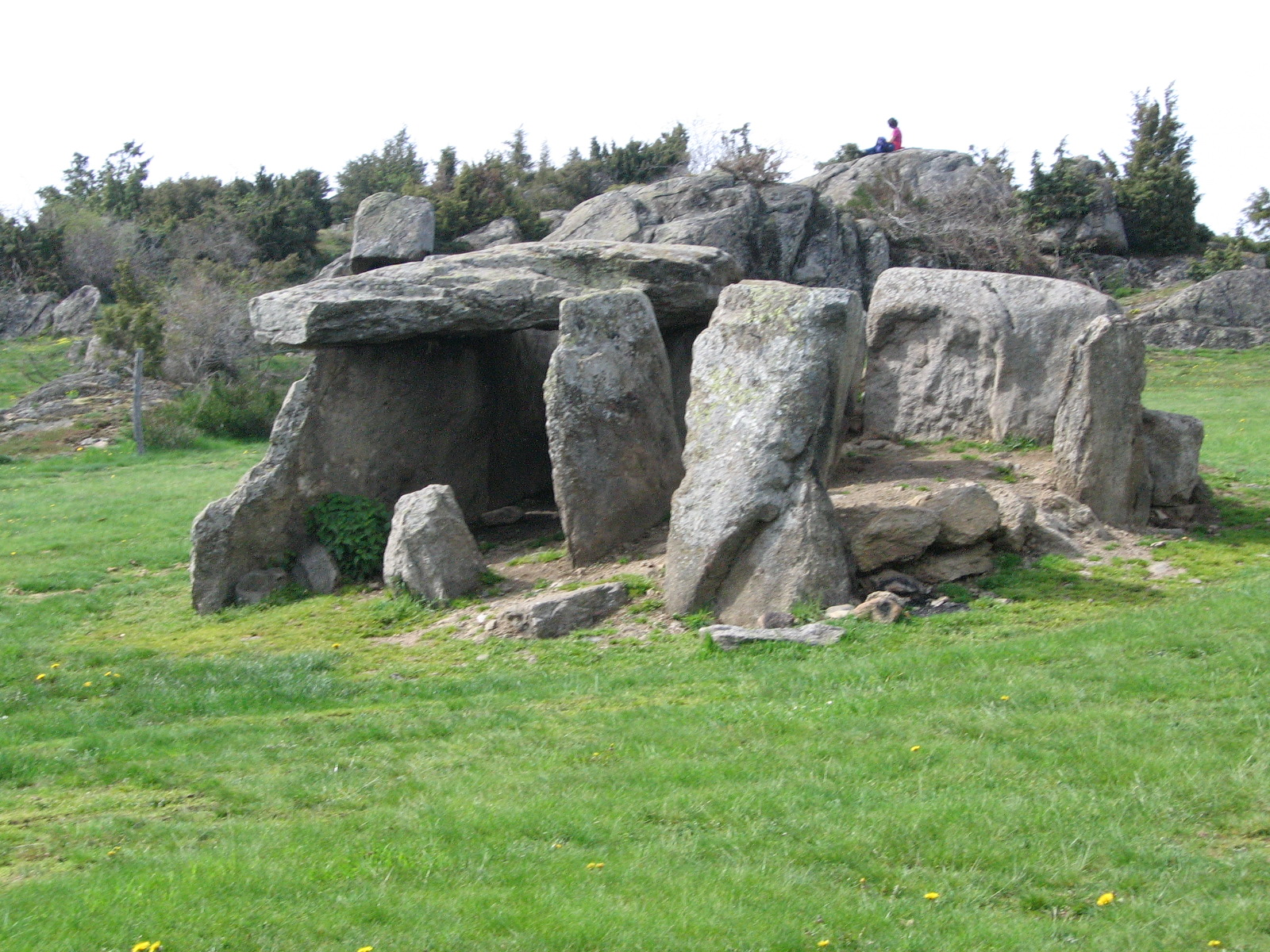
