= Olloix =

- Commune
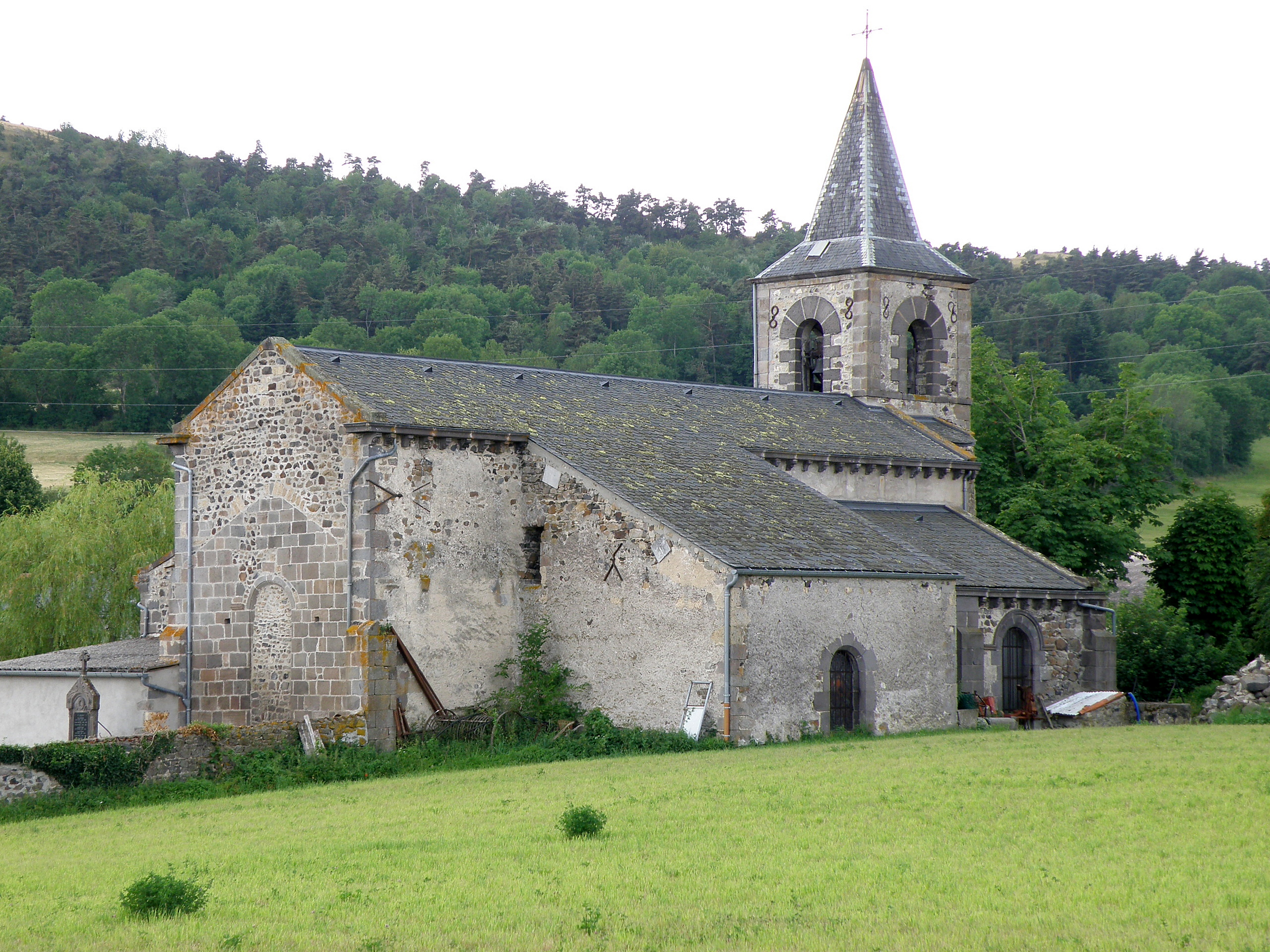
- The church in Olloix

- Coat of arms
- Location of Olloix
- Location within France Location within Auvergne-Rhône-Alpes
- Coordinates: 45°37′19″N 3°03′36″E
- Country: France
- Region: Auvergne-Rhône-Alpes
- Department: Puy-de-Dôme
- Arrondissement: Clermont-Ferrand
- Canton: Orcines
- Intercommunality: Mond'Arverne Communauté

Government
  - Mayor (2020–2026): Jean-Louis Cecchet
- Area^{1}: 11.92 km^{2} (4.60 sq mi)
- Elevation: 820 m (2,690 ft)
- Highest elevation: 1,002 m (3,287 ft)
- Lowest elevation: 520 m (1,710 ft)
- Population (2023): 331
  - Density: 27.8/km^{2} (71.9/sq mi)
- Time zone: UTC+01:00 (CET)
  - Summer (DST): UTC+02:00 (CEST)
- INSEE/Postal code: 63259 /63450
- ^{1} French Land Register data, which excludes lakes, ponds, glaciers > 1 km^{2} (0.386 sq mi or 247 acres) and river estuaries.

Olloix (French pronunciation: [ɔlwa]) is a commune in the Puy-de-Dôme department in Auvergne-Rhône-Alpes in central France.

== See also ==
- Communes of the Puy-de-Dôme department
