= Orcival =

- Commune
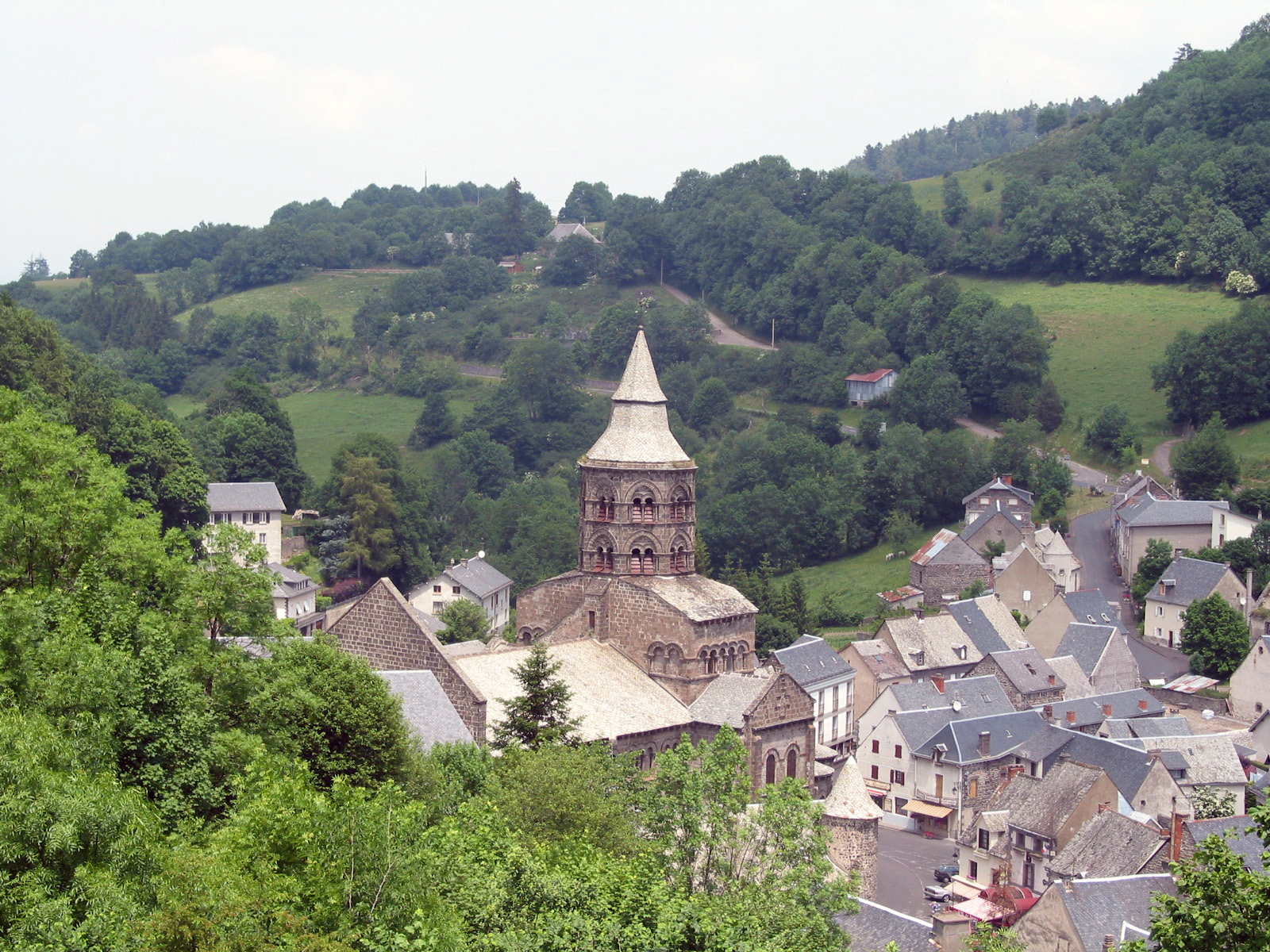
- A general view of Orcival

- Coat of arms
- Location of Orcival
- Location within France Location within Auvergne-Rhône-Alpes
- Coordinates: 45°41′02″N 2°50′31″E
- Country: France
- Region: Auvergne-Rhône-Alpes
- Department: Puy-de-Dôme
- Arrondissement: Issoire
- Canton: Orcines

Government
  - Mayor (2020–2026): Pascal Michaux
- Area^{1}: 27.82 km^{2} (10.74 sq mi)
- Elevation: 860 m (2,820 ft)
- Highest elevation: 1,509 m (4,951 ft)
- Lowest elevation: 780 m (2,560 ft)
- Population (2023): 240
  - Density: 8.6/km^{2} (22/sq mi)
- Time zone: UTC+01:00 (CET)
  - Summer (DST): UTC+02:00 (CEST)
- INSEE/Postal code: 63264 /63210
- ^{1} French Land Register data, which excludes lakes, ponds, glaciers > 1 km^{2} (0.386 sq mi or 247 acres) and river estuaries.

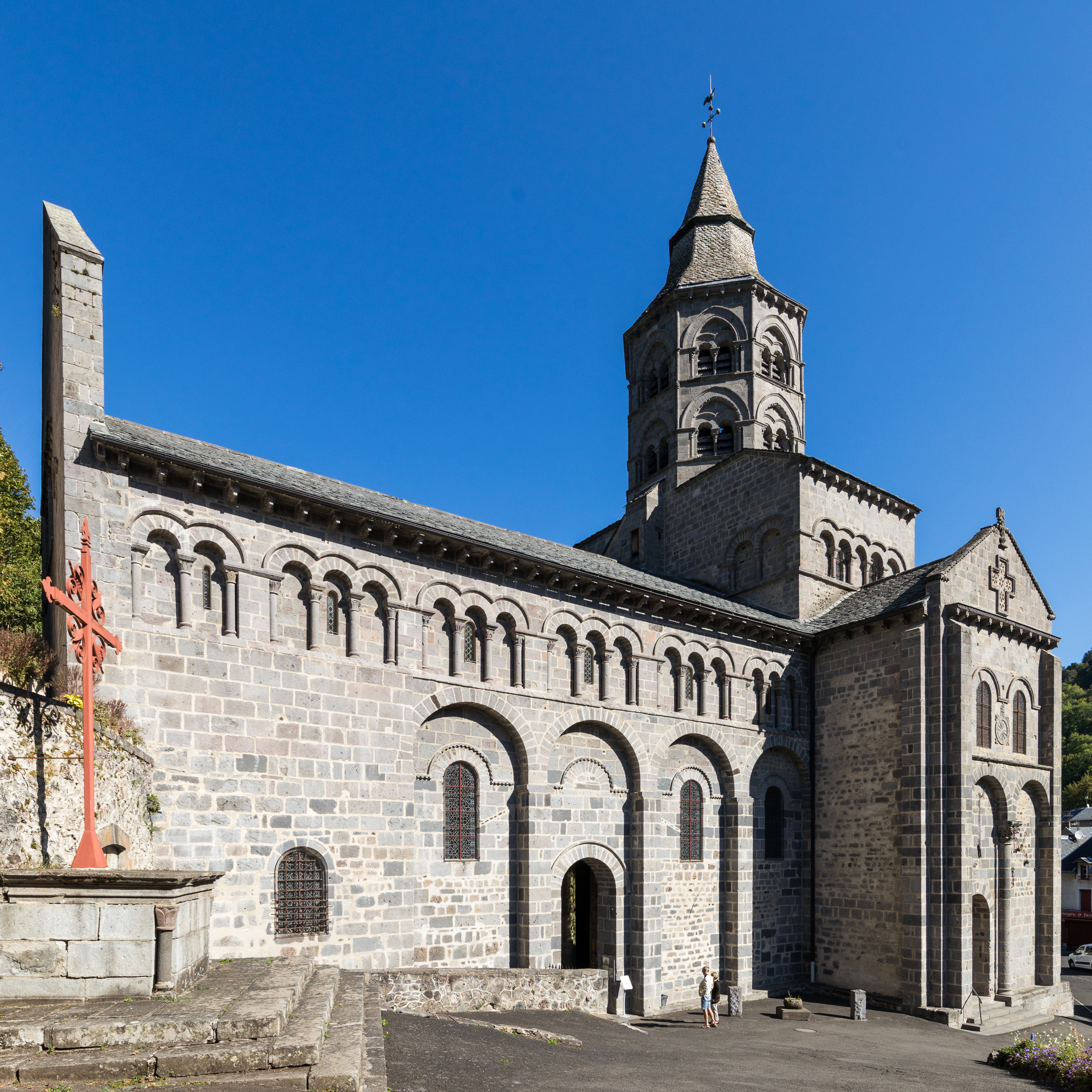
La basilique Notre-Dame

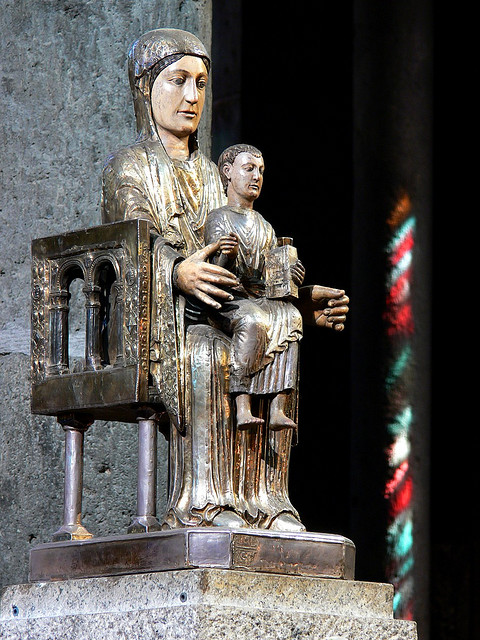
Romanesque statue of Virgin and Child - Notre Dame d'Orcival

Orcival (French pronunciation: [ɔʁsival]; Auvergnat: Orsivau) is a commune in the Puy-de-Dôme department in Auvergne in central France. The 12th–13th-century basilica of Notre Dame is a listed monument. It contains many ancient religious objects, including a 12th-century processional statue of the Virgin and Child.

The village of Orcival is located in the Vale of Silouet, 26 km from Clermont-Ferrand, west of Mont-Domes and north of Mont-Dore.

== See also ==
- Communes of the Puy-de-Dôme department
