= Tallende =

- Commune
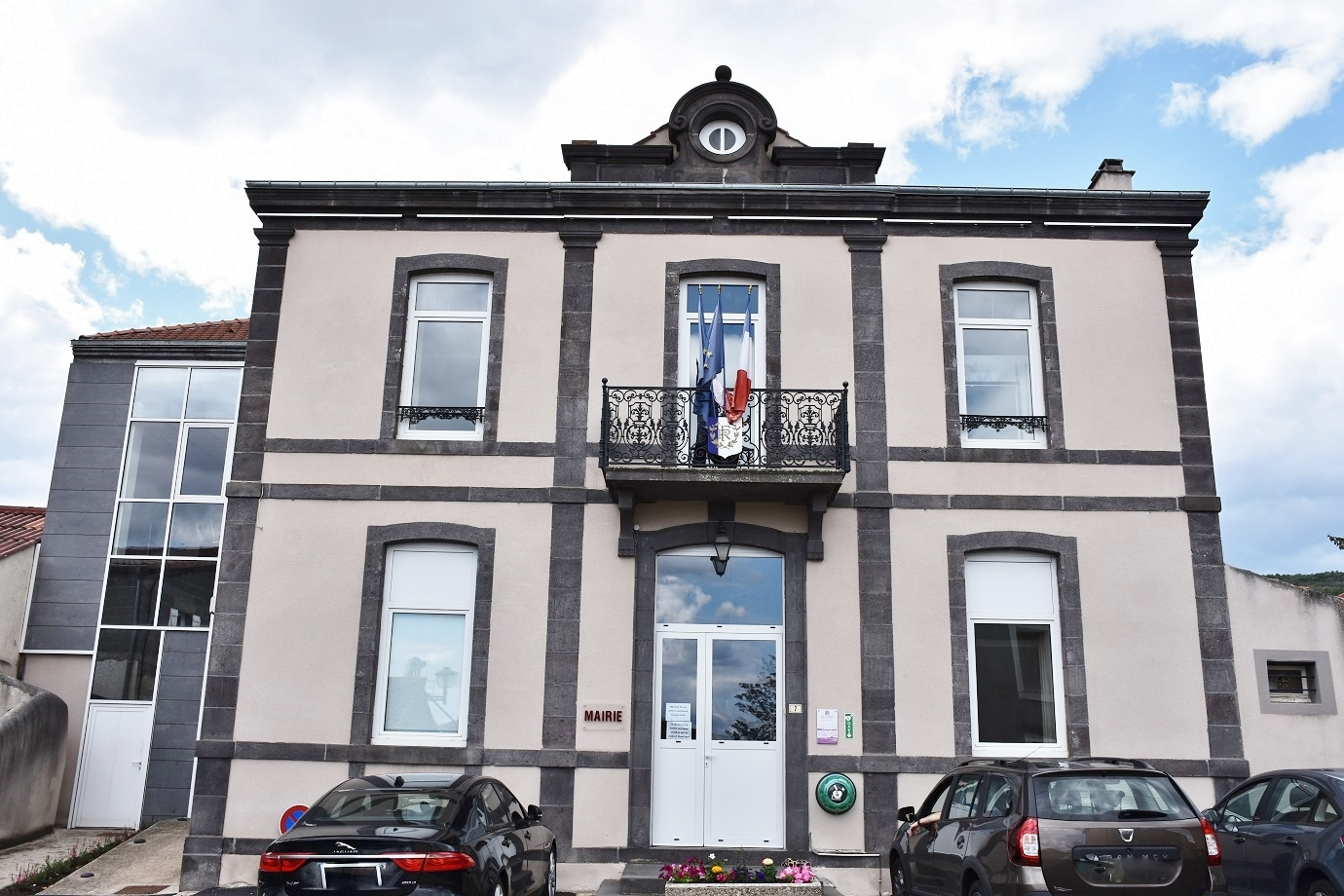
- Tallende Town hall

- Coat of arms
- Location of Tallende
- Location within France Location within Auvergne-Rhône-Alpes
- Coordinates: 45°40′16″N 3°07′30″E
- Country: France
- Region: Auvergne-Rhône-Alpes
- Department: Puy-de-Dôme
- Arrondissement: Clermont-Ferrand
- Canton: Les Martres-de-Veyre
- Intercommunality: Mond'Arverne Communauté

Government
  - Mayor (2026–32): Éric Brun
- Area^{1}: 5.99 km^{2} (2.31 sq mi)
- Elevation: 430 m (1,410 ft)
- Highest elevation: 511 m (1,677 ft)
- Lowest elevation: 366 m (1,201 ft)
- Population (2023): 1,619
  - Density: 270/km^{2} (700/sq mi)
- Time zone: UTC+01:00 (CET)
  - Summer (DST): UTC+02:00 (CEST)
- INSEE/Postal code: 63425 /63450
- ^{1} French Land Register data, which excludes lakes, ponds, glaciers > 1 km^{2} (0.386 sq mi or 247 acres) and river estuaries.

Tallende (French pronunciation: [talɑ̃d]) is a commune in the Puy-de-Dôme department in Auvergne-Rhône-Alpes in central France.

== See also ==
- Communes of the Puy-de-Dôme department
