= Lac d'Aydat =

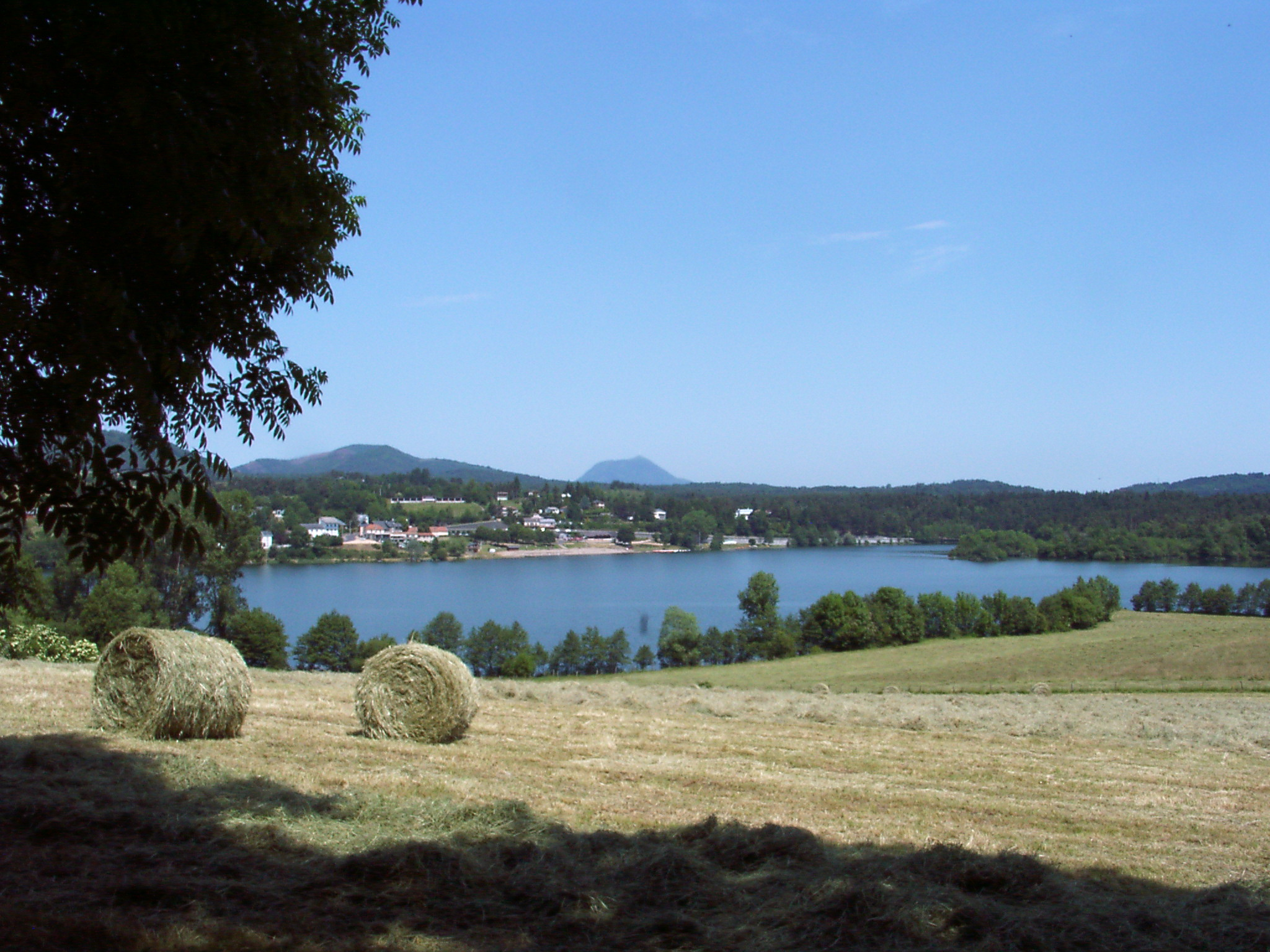

- Location within France
- Location: Aydat, Puy-de-Dôme
- Coordinates: 45.663996°N 2.984505°E
- Type: Natural freshwater lake
- Basin countries: France
- Max. length: 1.31 km (0.81 mi)
- Max. width: 1 km (0.62 mi)
- Surface area: 0.65 km^{2} (0.25 mi^{2})
- Max. depth: 15 m (49 ft)
- Surface elevation: 837 m (2,746 ft)
- Islands: Ile de Saint-Sidoine and several other islets

Lac d'Aydat is a lake in Aydat, Puy-de-Dôme, France. At an elevation of 837 metres (2,746 ft), its surface area is 0.65 square kilometres (0.25 sq mi). It is suggested by some historians that it is the site of Avitacum, the location of the villa belonging to the fifth-century senator and bishop Sidonius Apollinaris, as described in detail in one of his letters.
