= Saint-Saturnin, Puy-de-Dôme =

Saint-Saturnin
- Commune
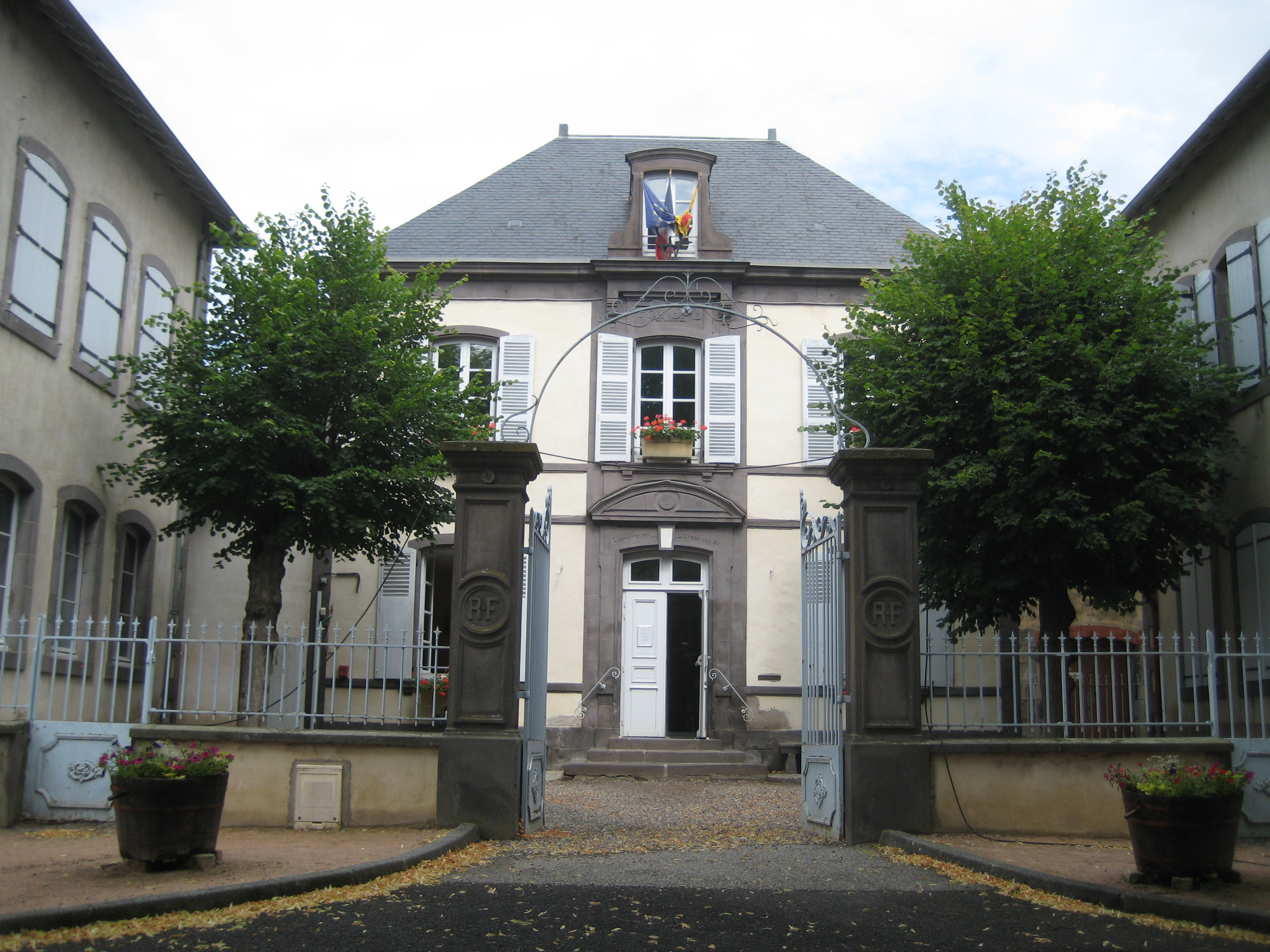
- The town hall in Saint-Saturnin

- Coat of arms
- Location of Saint-Saturnin
- Location within France Location within Auvergne-Rhône-Alpes
- Coordinates: 45°39′37″N 3°05′35″E
- Country: France
- Region: Auvergne-Rhône-Alpes
- Department: Puy-de-Dôme
- Arrondissement: Clermont-Ferrand
- Canton: Orcines
- Intercommunality: CC Mond'Arverne Communauté

Government
  - Mayor (2020–2026): Franck Taleb
- Area^{1}: 16.86 km^{2} (6.51 sq mi)
- Elevation: 531 m (1,742 ft)
- Highest elevation: 890 m (2,920 ft)
- Lowest elevation: 460 m (1,510 ft)
- Population (2023): 1,164
  - Density: 69.04/km^{2} (178.8/sq mi)
- Time zone: UTC+01:00 (CET)
  - Summer (DST): UTC+02:00 (CEST)
- INSEE/Postal code: 63396 /63450
- ^{1} French Land Register data, which excludes lakes, ponds, glaciers > 1 km^{2} (0.386 sq mi or 247 acres) and river estuaries.

Saint-Saturnin (French pronunciation: [sɛ̃ satyʁnɛ̃]; Auvergnat: Sent Sadornin) is a commune in the Puy-de-Dôme department in Auvergne in central France. Its 12th century Romanesque church is a listed monument.

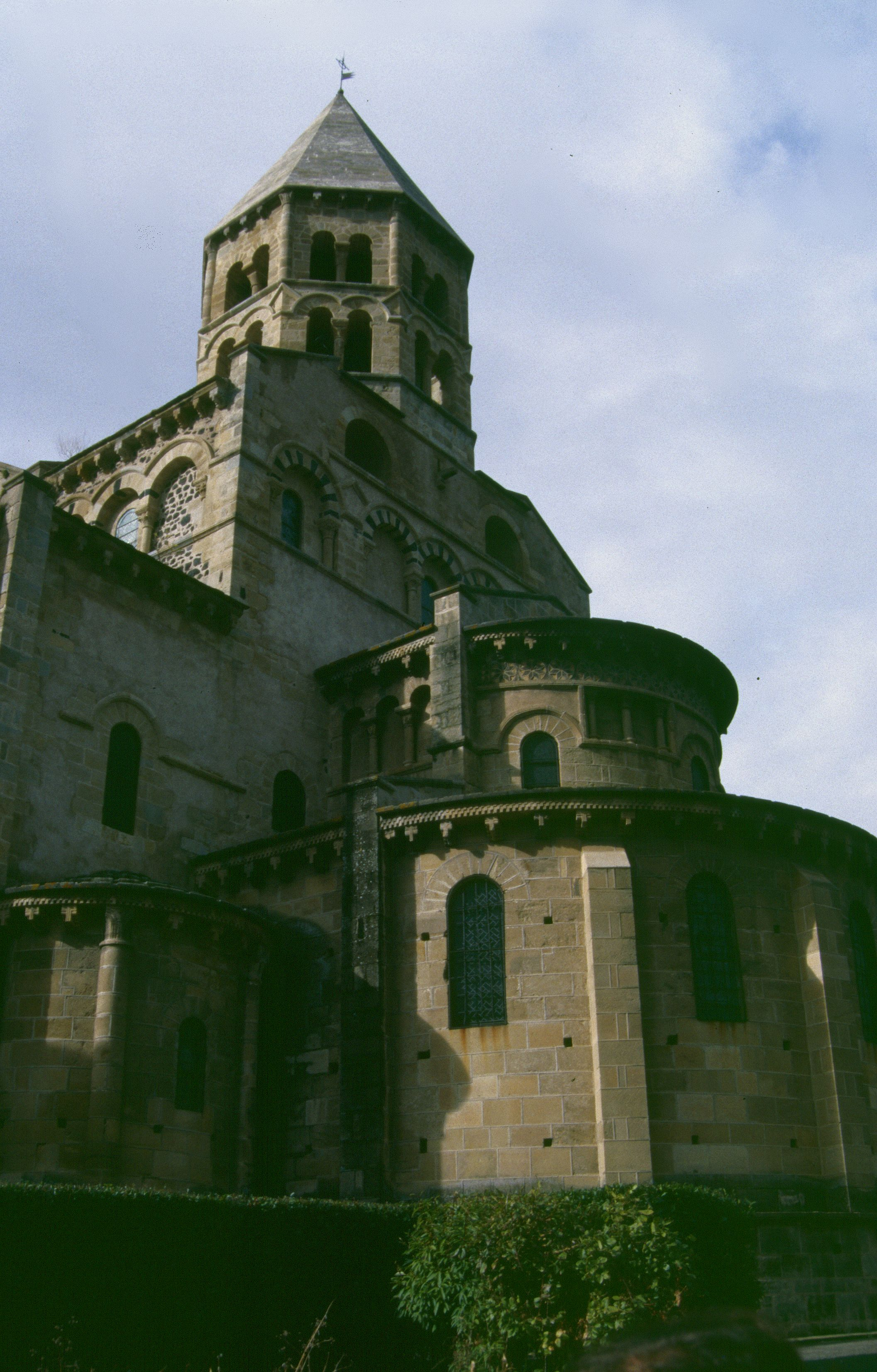
12th century church of Saint-Saturnin.

== See also ==
- Communes of the Puy-de-Dôme department
