= Couze =

Couze is an Auvergnat word meaning torrent. It may refer to the following places in France:

== Watercourses ==
- Couze (Corrèze), a river in Corrèze, a tributary of the Corrèze
- Couze (Vézère), a river in Corrèze, a tributary of the Vézère
- Couze (Dordogne), a river in Dordogne, a tributary of the Dordogne
- Couze (Haute-Vienne), a river in Haute-Vienne, a tributary of the Gartempe
- Couze Chambon, a river in Puy-de-Dôme, a tributary of the Allier
- Couze Pavin, also known as the Couze d'Issoire or Couze de Besse, a river in the centre of France, a tributary of the Allier
- Couze de Valbeleix, a tributary of the Couze Pavin

== Inhabited places ==
=== Corrèze department ===
- Lissac-sur-Couze, a commune

=== Dordogne department ===
- Couze, a former commune, now part of Couze-et-Saint-Front
- Couze-et-Saint-Front, a commune
- Port-de-Couze, in the commune of Lalinde, on the right bank of the Dordogne, opposite Couze-et-Saint-Front

=== Haute-Vienne department ===
- Saint-Symphorien-sur-Couze, a commune

=== Puy-de-Dôme department ===
- Ardes (also known as Ardes-sur-Couze), a commune
- Le Breuil-sur-Couze, a commune
- Saint-Cirgues-sur-Couze, a commune

== See also ==
- Saint-Thibaud-de-Couz, a commune in Savoie department, France
- Saint-Jean-de-Couz, a commune in Savoie department, France
