= Dominique Mortemousque =

French politician (1950–2022)

Mayor of Beaumontois-en-Périgord
- In office 7 January 2016 – 7 May 2022
- Preceded by: position established

Mayor of Beaumont-du-Périgord
- In office 21 March 2008 – 1 January 2016
- Preceded by: Dominique David-Astier
- Succeeded by: position abolished

Member of the Senate of France
- In office 8 June 2002 – 30 September 2008
- Preceded by: Xavier Darcos
- Succeeded by: Claude Bérit-Débat
- Constituency: Dordogne

General Councilor of the Canton of Beaumont-du-Périgord
- In office 27 March 1998 – 2 April 2015
- Preceded by: Paul Testut
- Succeeded by: position abolished

Mayor of Nojals-et-Clotte
- In office 16 June 1995 – 16 March 2008
- Succeeded by: Alain Merchadou

Personal details
- Born: 2 June 1950 Nojals-et-Clotte, France
- Died: 7 May 2022 (aged 71) Périgueux, France
- Party: UMP; LR

Dominique Mortemousque (French pronunciation: [dɔminik mɔʁtəmusk]; 2 June 1950 – 7 May 2022) was a French politician. He was a member of the Union for a Popular Movement and later The Republicans.

== Biography ==
A farmer by profession, Mortemousque served as mayor of Nojals-et-Clotte from 1995 to 2008. In March 1998, he was elected to represent the Canton of Beaumont-du-Périgord in the General Council of Dordogne. In 2002, he succeeded Xavier Darcos in the Senate, representing Dordogne. In March 2008, he was elected mayor of Beaumont-du-Périgord. He was Vice-President of the Communauté de communes du Pays beaumontois from 2008 to 2012. He was defeated in the 2008 French Senate election by Claude Bérit-Débat of the Socialist Party.

On 17 June 2012, Mortemousque was defeated by Brigitte Allain of Europe Ecology – The Greens in his bid to represent Dordogne's 2nd constituency in the National Assembly. He was re-elected as mayor of Beaumont-du-Périgord in 2014. He was defeated in his 2015 bid to represent the Canton of Lalinde in the Departmental Council of Dordogne. On 1 January 2016, four communes were merged to form Beaumontois-en-Périgord, of which he served as the first mayor.

Mortemousque died in Périgueux on 7 May 2022, at the age of 71.
