= Harold L. Dibble =

American Paleolithic archaeologist

Harold Lewis Dibble (26 July 1951 – June 10, 2018) was an American Paleolithic archaeologist. His main research concerned lithic reduction; he conducted fieldwork mainly in France, Egypt, and Morocco. He was a professor of Anthropology at the University of Pennsylvania and Curator-in-Charge of the European Section of the University of Pennsylvania Museum of Archaeology and Anthropology.

== Education ==
Dibble received his B.A. in 1971 and Ph.D. in 1981, both from the University of Arizona. He wrote his dissertation under the direction of Arthur J. Jelinek, an American archaeologist who had been trained in North American prehistoric archaeology by Leslie A. White and who worked on both the Paleolithic of Western Eurasia and the Mimbres culture in New Mexico. While a graduate student in the late 1970s, Dibble excavated with the French prehistorian François Bordes at the site of Pech de l'Azé IV in Carsac-Aillac, France, with whom he developed a strong mentoring relationship.

== Archaeological work ==
The majority of Dibble's archaeological work was centered around Neanderthals and early modern humans in Western Eurasia, and more particularly on the stone tools which are thought to have been the primary mode of their material culture. He wrote his dissertation on the stone tool technology of Tabun Cave in Israel and then focused primarily on France, with other research on the Zagros stone tool industries until beginning work in Egypt and Morocco in 2001 and 2006 respectively. In addition to his excavation work, he has maintained a skeptical view of symbolism in the Middle Paleolithic, on which he has published several articles, and he has strongly advocated quantitative methods in archaeology. To that end, he pioneered the use of GIS and total stations in excavations and has worked to quantify the understanding of stone tool manufacture via reproductive experiments. As a graduate student, Dibble was paid to produce the stone tools used in the film The Clan of the Cave Bear.

=== Scraper reduction ===
Dibble's most-cited contribution to archaeological thought is commonly known as scraper reduction, built off of ideas first developed by Jelinek and George Carr Frison. Dibble's hypothesis is that as Middle Paleolithic scrapers are subject to retouching, their forms change in a predictable manner, and the many scraper types of the Bordian typology represent different stages in the continuum of reduction from fresh blank to exhausted transverse scraper. Moreover, the intensity of reduction, as measured by quantity of more reduced versus less reduced scrapers, strongly correlates to availability of raw material.

An analogy used by Dibble is that of a pencil. Its initial form is long, with a full eraser and blunt writing end, which is then sharpened and used repeatedly until discarded in a much shorter form with a worn eraser. This is the form in which the pencil would be found by someone digging through the trash, though it bears little resemblance to the initially produced form of the pencil. If pencils are more plentiful, then they may be more readily discarded earlier in their use life; if they are more scarce, then they will be resharpened far more and discarded in a far smaller state. This parallels the forms in which archaeologists find the used and discarded forms of Middle Paleolithic scrapers.

At the time of its proposition, this was a relatively radical idea, as prior to then it was generally assumed that the typological categories were both discrete and desired forms. This idea was the basis to an earlier feud, the Bordes-Binford Debate, between Bordes and Lewis R. Binford. While Bordes posited that various facies of the Mousterian, defined typologically, were the result of different cultures, Binford maintained that each of the facies was functionally defined. Dibble's theory, by implying that stone tools as discovered by archaeologists are the result of a constant process of use and reuse and that what is excavated is often at the end of a long and complicated use-life, forced a reexamination of the entire debate.

=== Fieldwork ===
Dibble was director or co-director of three projects: excavations at the cave of Roc de Marsal, Campagne, Dordogne, France from 2004 to 2010; excavations at the Grotte des Contrabandiers (Smugglers' Cave) in Témara, Morocco in 2006; and the Abydos Survey for Paleolithic Sites in the high desert surrounding Abydos, Egypt from 2000 to 2007. In 2011 he began directing excavations at La Ferassie, also in the Dordogne region, where 6 Neandertal skeletons were found in 1913 and one in 1972.

Additionally, he has directed or co-directed projects in France continuously since 1987, beginning at Combe-Capelle Bas in the Couze Valley, Dordogne, France from 1987 to 1990. This was followed by work with his former Ph.D. student Shannon J.P. McPherron at Cagny-l'Epinette, Somme, France from 1991 to 1994 and Fontéchevade, Charente-Maritime, France from 1994 to 1998. Just prior to excavating Roc de Marsal, Dibble and McPherron reexcavated Pech de l'Azé IV, where Dibble had worked with Bordes in the 1970s, from 1999 to 2002.

A major push of Dibble's research program has been to reexcavate known and previously excavated sites using modern methodology. This has been done in conjunction with reanalysis of the old lithic collections, and, when combined, these allow comparison between the old and new collections. The comparison illuminates what was kept and what was discarded by the previous excavators, giving new life and interpretive value to the older collections.

=== Computer applications in archaeology ===
Dibble and McPherron developed several freeware computer applications for Windows to facilitate archaeological fieldwork, including NewPlot (an archaeologically specific GIS program), EDM-CE and EDM Windows (data collector programs for use with Total Stations for Windows Mobile and Windows 95/98 respectively), and E4 (data collection program for artifact analysis). Their system has been adopted by a number of other excavators throughout North America, Europe and Africa, and they published extensively on these methods.

== Personal life and death ==
Dibble and his wife Lee had two sons, Chip and Flint. He died on June 10, 2018, of complications of cancer. Flint Dibble is also an archaeologist, specialising in the zooarchaeology of Ancient Greece.

== Selected publications ==
=== Books ===
- Debenath, A. and Dibble, H.L. 1994. Handbook of Paleolithic Typology: Lower and Middle Paleolithic of Europe. Philadelphia: University Museum Press. ISBN 0-924171-23-5
- Dibble, H., S. McPherron, and B. Roth. 1999. Virtual Dig: A Simulated Archaeological Excavation of a Middle Paleolithic Site in France. Mayfield Press, Mountain View, Calif.
- McPherron, S. and H.L. Dibble. 2002. Using Computers in Archaeology: A Practical Guide. New York: McGraw-Hill Publishing. ISBN 0-7674-1735-6
- Dibble, H.L., D. Williamson, and B.M. Evans. 2003. The Human Evolution Cookbook. Philadelphia: University Museum Press. ISBN 1-931707-49-9
- Chase, P., A. Debénath, H. Dibble, and S. McPherron. 2009. The Cave of Fontéchevade: Recent Excavations and Their Paleoanthropological Implications. Cambridge University Press, Cambridge.
- Dibble, H. L., Shannon J. P. McPherron, Paul Goldberg, Dennis M. Sandgathe. 2018. The Middle Paleolithic Site of Pech de l'Azé IV. Springer. ISBN 978-3-319-57524-7

=== Articles ===
- Dibble, Harold L.; Bernard, Mary C. (1980). "A Comparative Study of Basic Edge Angle Measurement Techniques". American Antiquity. 45 (4): 857–865. doi:10.2307/280156. JSTOR 280156. S2CID 62533484.
- Dibble, Harold L.; Chase, Philip G. (1981). "A New Method for Describing and Analyzing Artifact Shape". American Antiquity. 46 (1): 178–187. doi:10.2307/279998. JSTOR 279998. S2CID 62626548.
- Dibble, Harold L.; Whittaker, John C. (1981). "New experimental evidence on the relation between percussion flaking and flake variation". Journal of Archaeological Science. 8 (3): 283–296. Bibcode:1981JArSc...8..283D. doi:10.1016/0305-4403(81)90004-2.
- Dibble, H. L. 1983. "Variability and Change in the Middle Paleolithic of Western Europe and the Near East," in The Mousterian Legacy: Human Biocultural Change in the Upper Pleistocene, BAR International Series 164. Edited by E. Trinkaus, pp. 53–71. Oxford: British Archaeological Reports.
- Dibble, Harold L. (1984). "News and Short Contributions". Journal of Field Archaeology. 11 (4): 431–436. doi:10.2307/529322. JSTOR 529322.
- Dibble, Harold Lewis (1984). "The Mousterian Industry from Bisitun Cave (Iran)". Paléorient. 10 (2): 23–34. doi:10.3406/paleo.1984.937.
- Dibble, Harold L. (1 August 1985). "Raw-Material Variation in Levallois Flake Manufacture". Current Anthropology. 26 (3): 391–393. doi:10.1086/203286. JSTOR 2742740. S2CID 144339955.
- Chase, Philip G.; Dibble, Harold L. (1987). "Middle paleolithic symbolism: A review of current evidence and interpretations". Journal of Anthropological Archaeology. 6 (3): 263–296. doi:10.1016/0278-4165(87)90003-1.
- Dibble, H. L. 1987. Measurement of Artifact Provenience with an Electronic Theodolite. Journal of Field Archaeology 14(2):249-254.
- Dibble, Harold L. (1987). "The Interpretation of Middle Paleolithic Scraper Morphology". American Antiquity. 52 (1): 109–117. doi:10.2307/281062. JSTOR 281062. S2CID 160889953.
- Dibble, H. L. 1988. Typological Aspects of Reduction and Intensity of Utilization of Lithic Resources in the French Mousterian. In Upper Pleistocene Prehistory of Western Eurasia, edited by H. L. Dibble and A. Montet-White, pp. 181–187. University Museum Monograph 54. University Museum, University of Pennsylvania, Philadelphia, PA.
- Dibble, H. L. 1988. The Interpretation of Middle Paleolithic Scraper Reduction Patterns. In La Technique, edited by L. R. Binford and J.-P. Rigaud, pp. 49–58. L'Homme de Néandertal. vol. 4, M. Otte, general editor. Etudes et Recherches Archéologiques de l'Université de Liège No. 31, Liège.
- Dibble, Harold L.; McPherron, Shannon P. (1988). "On the Computerization of Archaeological Projects". Journal of Field Archaeology. 15 (4): 431–440. doi:10.2307/530045. JSTOR 530045.
- Dibble, Harold L.; Holloway, R. L.; Marshack, Alexander; Rosenfeld, Andree; Trompf, Garry W.; Noble, William; Davidson, Iain (1989). "On Depiction and Language". Current Anthropology. 30 (3): 330–342. doi:10.1086/203748. S2CID 143239388.
- Rolland, Nicolas; Dibble, Harold L. (1990). "A New Synthesis of Middle Paleolithic Variability". American Antiquity. 55 (3): 480–499. doi:10.2307/281279. JSTOR 281279. S2CID 161990108.
- Dibble, Harold L (1991). "Mousterian Assemblage Variability on an Interregional Scale". Journal of Anthropological Research. 47 (2): 239–257. doi:10.1086/jar.47.2.3630327. JSTOR 3630327. S2CID 163922797.
- Chase, Phillip G.; Dibble, Harold L. (1992). "Scientific Archaeology and the Origins of Symbolism: A reply to Bednarik". Cambridge Archaeological Journal. 2: 43–51. doi:10.1017/S0959774300000469. S2CID 163028758.
- Dibble, H. L. and N. Rolland. 1992. On Assemblage Variability in the Middle Paleolithic of Western Europe: History, Perspectives, and a New Synthesis. In The Middle Paleolithic: Adaptation, Behavior, and Variability, edited by H. L. Dibble and P. Mellars, pp. 2–28. University Museum Monograph 78. University Museum, University of Pennsylvania, Philadelphia, PA.
- Dibble, Harold L.; Bar-Yosef, Ofer (2005). "Definition and interpretation of Levallois technology". Evolutionary Anthropology: Issues, News, and Reviews. 2 (3): 77. doi:10.1002/evan.1360020302. S2CID 129126768.
- Chase, Philip G.; Armand, Dominique; Debénath, André; Dibble, Harold; Jelinek, Arthur J. (1994). "Taphonomy and Zooarchaeology of a Mousterian Faunal Assemblage from la Quina, Charente, France". Journal of Field Archaeology. 21 (3): 289–305. doi:10.2307/530332. JSTOR 530332.
- Bar-Yosef, O. and H. L. Dibble. 1995. Preface. In The Definition and Interpretation of Levallois Technology, edited by H. L. Dibble and O. Bar-Yosef, pp. ix-xiii. Monographs in World Archaeology No. 23. Prehistory Press, Madison, WI.
- Dibble, H. L. 1995. An Assessment of the Integrity of the Archaeological Assemblages. In The Middle Paleolithic Site of Combe-Capelle Bas (France), edited by H. L. Dibble and M. Lenoir, pp. 245–258. University Museum Monograph 91. University Museum, University of Pennsylvania, Philadelphia, PA.
- Dibble, H. L. 1995. Biache-Saint-Vaast, Level IIA: A Comparison of Analytical Approaches. In The Definition and Interpretation of Levallois Technology, edited by H. L. Dibble and O. Bar-Yosef, pp. 93–116. Monographs in World Archaeology No. 23. Prehistory Press, Madison, WI.
- Dibble, H. L. 1995. Raw Material Availability, Intensity of Utilization, and Middle Paleolithic Assemblage Variability. In The Middle Paleolithic Site of Combe-Capelle Bas (France), edited by H. L. Dibble and M. Lenoir, pp. 289–315. University Museum Monograph 91. University Museum, University of Pennsylvania, Philadelphia, PA.
- Dibble, Harold L. (1995). "Middle paleolithic scraper reduction: Background, clarification, and review of the evidence to date". Journal of Archaeological Method and Theory. 2 (4): 299–368. doi:10.1007/bf02229003. S2CID 143516307.
- Dibble, Harold L.; Pelcin, Andrew (1995). "The Effect of Hammer Mass and Velocity on Flake Mass". Journal of Archaeological Science. 22 (3): 429–439. Bibcode:1995JArSc..22..429D. doi:10.1006/jasc.1995.0042.
- Dibble, Harold L. (1997). "Platform Variability and Flake Morphology: A Comparison of Experimental and Archaeological Data and Implications for Interpreting Prehistoric Lithic Technological Strategies". Lithic Technology. 22 (2): 150–170. doi:10.1080/01977261.1997.11754540.
- Dibble, Harold L.; Chase, Philip G.; McPherron, Shannon P.; Tuffreau, Alain (1997). "Testing the Reality of a "Living Floor" with Archaeological Data". American Antiquity. 62 (4): 629–651. doi:10.2307/281882. JSTOR 281882. S2CID 161522212.
- Dibble, Harold L.; McPherron, Shannon P. (1997). "The Making of Combe-Capelle on CD-ROM". Journal of Field Archaeology. 24 (1): 59–66. doi:10.2307/530561. JSTOR 530561.
- Dibble, Harold L. (1998). "Comment on "Quantifying Lithic Curation: An Experimental Test of Dibble and Pelcin's Original Flake-Tool Mass Predictor", by Zachary J. Davis and John J. Shea". Journal of Archaeological Science. 25 (7): 611–613. Bibcode:1998JArSc..25..611D. doi:10.1006/jasc.1997.0254.
- Roth, Barbara J.; Dibble, Harold L. (1998). "Production and Transport of Blanks and Tools at the French Middle Paleolithic Site of Combe-Capelle Bas". American Antiquity. 63 (1): 47–62. doi:10.2307/2694775. JSTOR 2694775. S2CID 163348661.
- McPherron, S. P. and H. L. Dibble. 1999. Stone Tool Analysis Using Digitized Images: Examples From the Lower and Middle Paleolithic. Lithic Technology 24(1):38-52.
- McPherron, S. P. and H. L. Dibble. 2000. The Lithic Assemblages of Pech de l'Aze IV (Dordogne, France). Préhistoire Européenne 15:9-43.
- Valladas, Hélène; Mercier, Norbert; Joron, Jean Louis; McPherron, Shannon P.; Dibble, Harold L.; Lenoir, Michel (2003). "TL dates for the Middle Paleolithic site of Combe-Capelle Bas, France". Journal of Archaeological Science. 30 (11): 1443–1450. Bibcode:2003JArSc..30.1443V. doi:10.1016/s0305-4403(03)00039-6.
- Dibble, H.L., S.J.P. McPherron, P.G. Chase, W.R. Farrand, and A. Debénath. 2006. Taphonomy and the concept of Paleolithic cultures: The case of the Tayacian from Fontéchevade. PaleoAnthropology:1-21.
- Dibble, H.L.; McPherron, S.J.P. (2006). "The missing Mousterian". Current Anthropology. 47 (5): 777–803. doi:10.1086/506282. S2CID 145362900.
- Dibble, H.L., P. Goldberg, S.J.P. McPherron, A. Turq, and D. Sandgathe. 2006. "Humans, climate and fire at the Mousterian site of Roc de Marsal, France," in Annual Meeting of the Geological Society of America. Philadelphia, PA: Geological Society of America.
- Olszewski, D.I.; Dibble, H.L.; Schurmans, U.A.; McPherron, S.J.P.; Smith, J.R. (2005). "High desert Paleolithic survey at Abydos, Egypt". Journal of Field Archaeology. 30 (3): 283–303. doi:10.1179/009346905791072233. S2CID 140144509.
- McPherron, S.J.P.; Dibble, H.L.; Goldberg, P. (2005). "Z". Geoarchaeology. 20 (3): 243–262. doi:10.1002/gea.20048. S2CID 241646842.
- Dibble, Harold L.; Schurmans, Utsav A.; Iovita, Radu P.; McLaughlin, Michael V. (2005). "The Measurement and Interpretation of Cortex in Lithic Assemblages". American Antiquity. 70 (3): 545–560. doi:10.2307/40035313. JSTOR 40035313. S2CID 163507627.
- Dibble, Harold L.; Raczek, Teresa P.; McPherron, Shannon P. (2005). "Excavator Bias at the Site of Pech de l'Azé IV, France". Journal of Field Archaeology. 30 (3): 317–328. doi:10.1179/009346905791072242. S2CID 129452737.
- McPherron, S.J.P.; Dibble, H.L. (2002). "Using computers in adverse field conditions: Tales from the Egyptian desert" (PDF). The SAA Archaeological Record. 3: 28–32. Archived from the original (PDF) on 2011-04-04.
- Dibble, H.L. 1991. "Local Raw Material Exploitation and its Effects on Lower and Middle Paleolithic Assemblage Variability", in Raw Material Economies among Prehistoric Hunter-Gatherers, University of Kansas Publications in Anthropology. Edited by A. Montet-White and S. Holen, pp. 33–47. Lawrence, Kansas: University of Kansas.
