= Couze (Dordogne) =

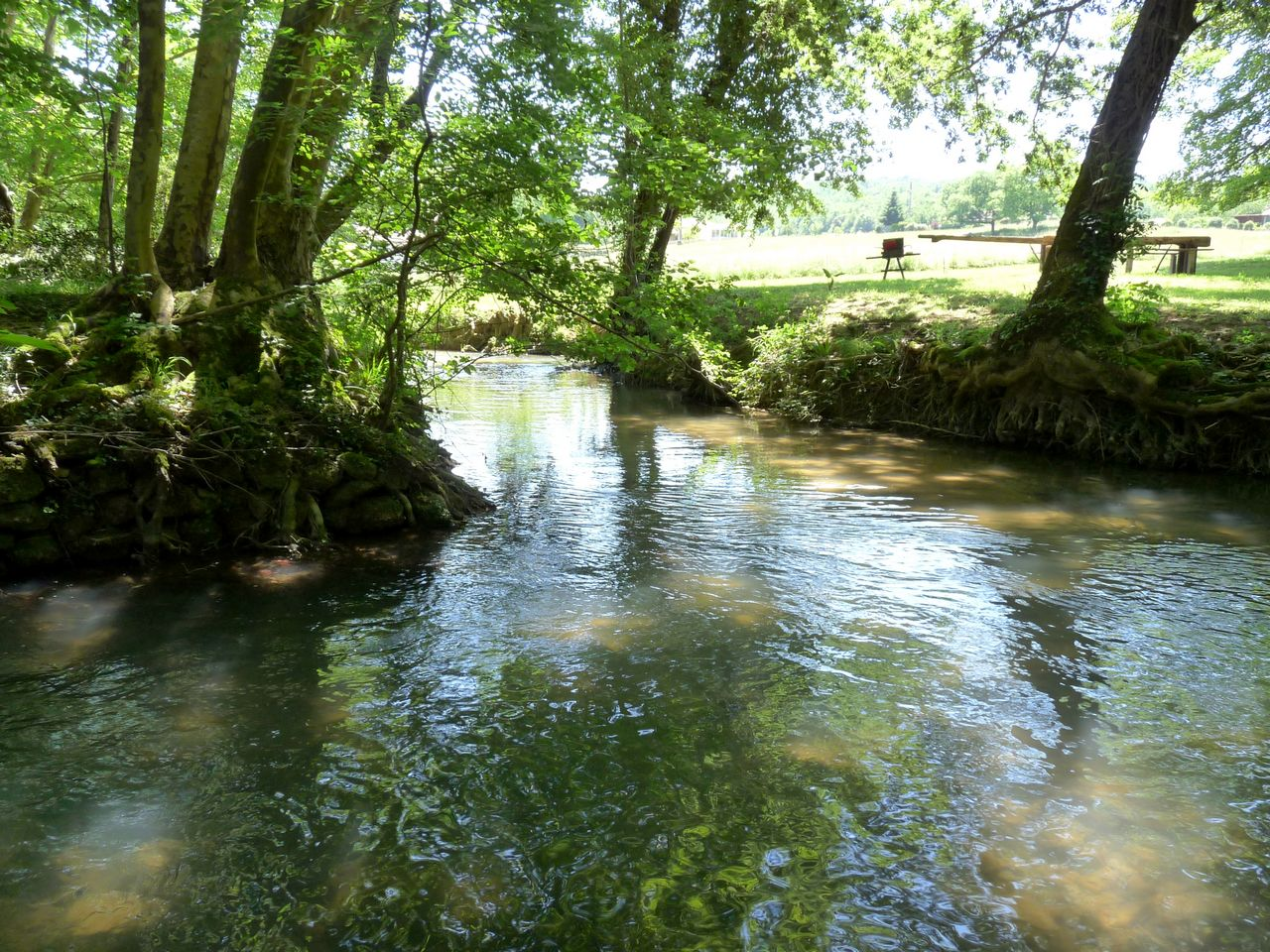

- Location within France Location within Nouvelle-Aquitaine

Location
- Country: France

Physical characteristics
- Mouth: Dordogne
  - coordinates: 44°49′53″N 0°42′11″E
- Length: 30.1 km (18.7 mi)

Basin features
- Progression: Dordogne→ Gironde estuary→ Atlantic Ocean

The Couze (French pronunciation: [kuz]) is a 30.1-kilometre-long (18.7 mi) tributary of the Dordogne in France, with its source between Fongalop and Bouillac, and its mouth in Port-de-Couze. The lower half of the stream runs between limestone cliffs. The main villages along the river and its small tributaries are Beaumont-du-Périgord, Montferrand-du-Périgord, Couze-et-Saint-Front and Saint-Avit-Sénieur.

Alongside the river many Paleolithic sites have been found, including the important sites of La Gravette which gave its name to the Gravettian, a major European prehistoric culture which lasted from more than 10,000 years between circa 33,000 BP and 21,000 BP; and Combe-Capelle. Remains from the Neolithic and later periods are more sparse, until habitation again increased in the Middle Ages.

== Paleolithic sites ==
The first archaeological excavations started in the late 19th century, and intensified between 1900 and 1914. The main archaeologist working here was Denis Peyrony from Les Eyzies.

- La Gravette, eponymous site for the Gravettian culture, discovered in 1880
- Combe-Capelle, where in 1909 a skull was found which was thought to be 30,000 years old. Later research revised the date to 7,000 years old.
- La Cavaille, cave with a few engravings from the Périgordian period, discovered in 1934
- Les Jean-Blancs, where an engraving of a female figure dating to the Upper Magdalenian was found
- Termo-Pialat, discovered in 1911, where some engraved blocks were found

== Medieval sites ==
- The large church of Saint-Avit-Sénieur is located on the Camino de Santiago coming from Vézelay, in the French region of Bourgogne-Franche-Comté.
