= Saint-Avit-Sénieur =

- Commune
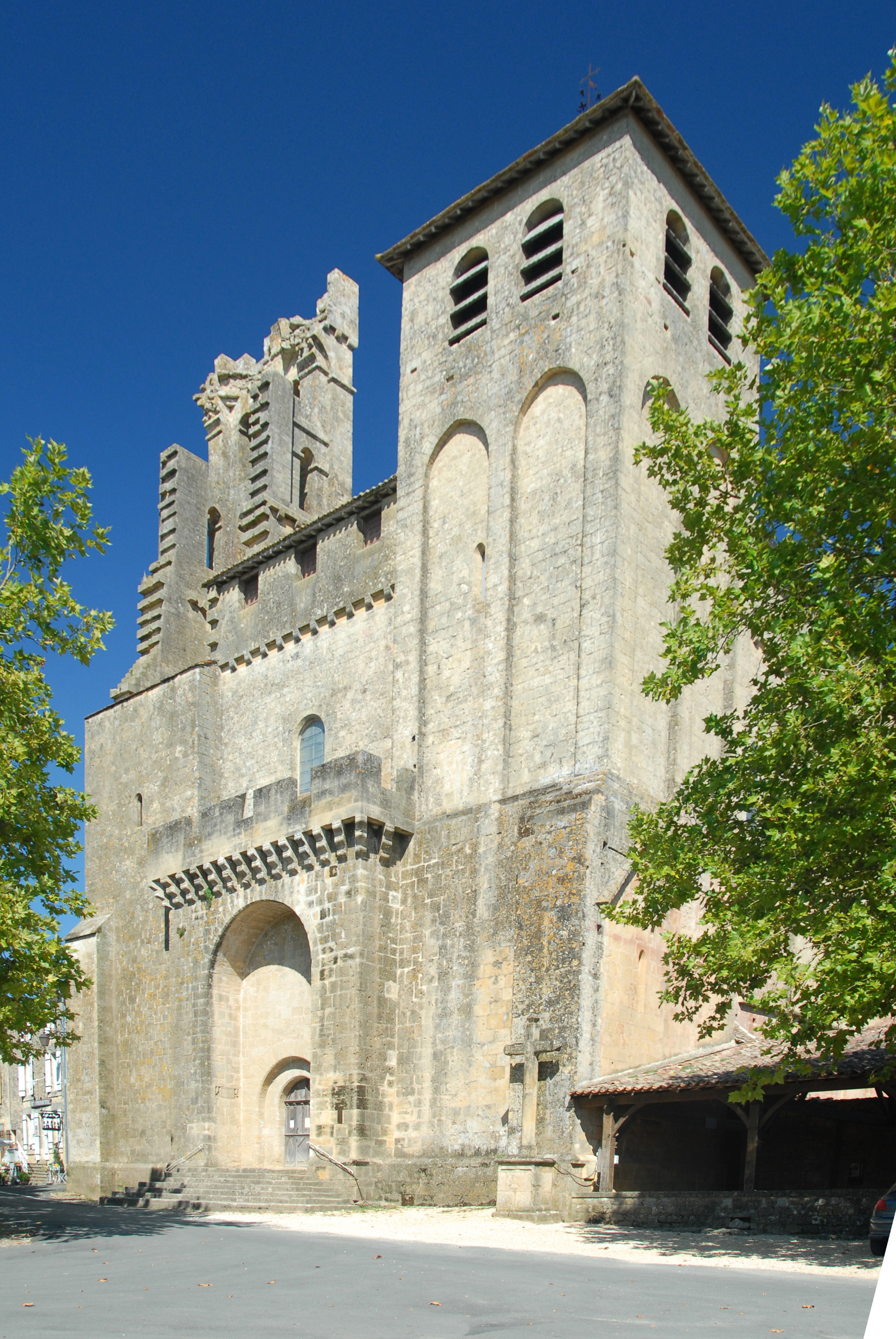
- The church
- Location of Saint-Avit-Sénieur
- Location within France Location within Nouvelle-Aquitaine
- Coordinates: 44°46′32″N 0°49′02″E
- Country: France
- Region: Nouvelle-Aquitaine
- Department: Dordogne
- Arrondissement: Bergerac
- Canton: Lalinde

Government
  - Mayor (2020–2026): Alain Delayre
- Area^{1}: 23.4 km^{2} (9.0 sq mi)
- Elevation: 171 m (561 ft)
- Highest elevation: 195 m (640 ft)
- Lowest elevation: 61 m (200 ft)
- Population (2023): 422
  - Density: 18.0/km^{2} (46.7/sq mi)
- Time zone: UTC+01:00 (CET)
  - Summer (DST): UTC+02:00 (CEST)
- INSEE/Postal code: 24379 /24440
- ^{1} French Land Register data, which excludes lakes, ponds, glaciers > 1 km^{2} (0.386 sq mi or 247 acres) and river estuaries.

Saint-Avit-Sénieur (French pronunciation: [sɛ̃.t‿avi senjœʁ]; Occitan: Sench Avit Senhor) is a commune in the Dordogne department in Nouvelle-Aquitaine in southwestern France.

The most notable feature of the village is a massive church from the end of the 11th and 12th century. Next to the church, an abbey has been erected to honour the hermit Avitus, who died in 570. Avitus gave his name to the abbey and the village.

The abbey used to house canons, disciples of Augustine of Hippo. It is now mostly in ruins.

The size of the church (51 × 23 meters) can be explained by the fame of the village on the Way of St. James: one of the paths starting from Vézelay passes through this place.

== Situation ==
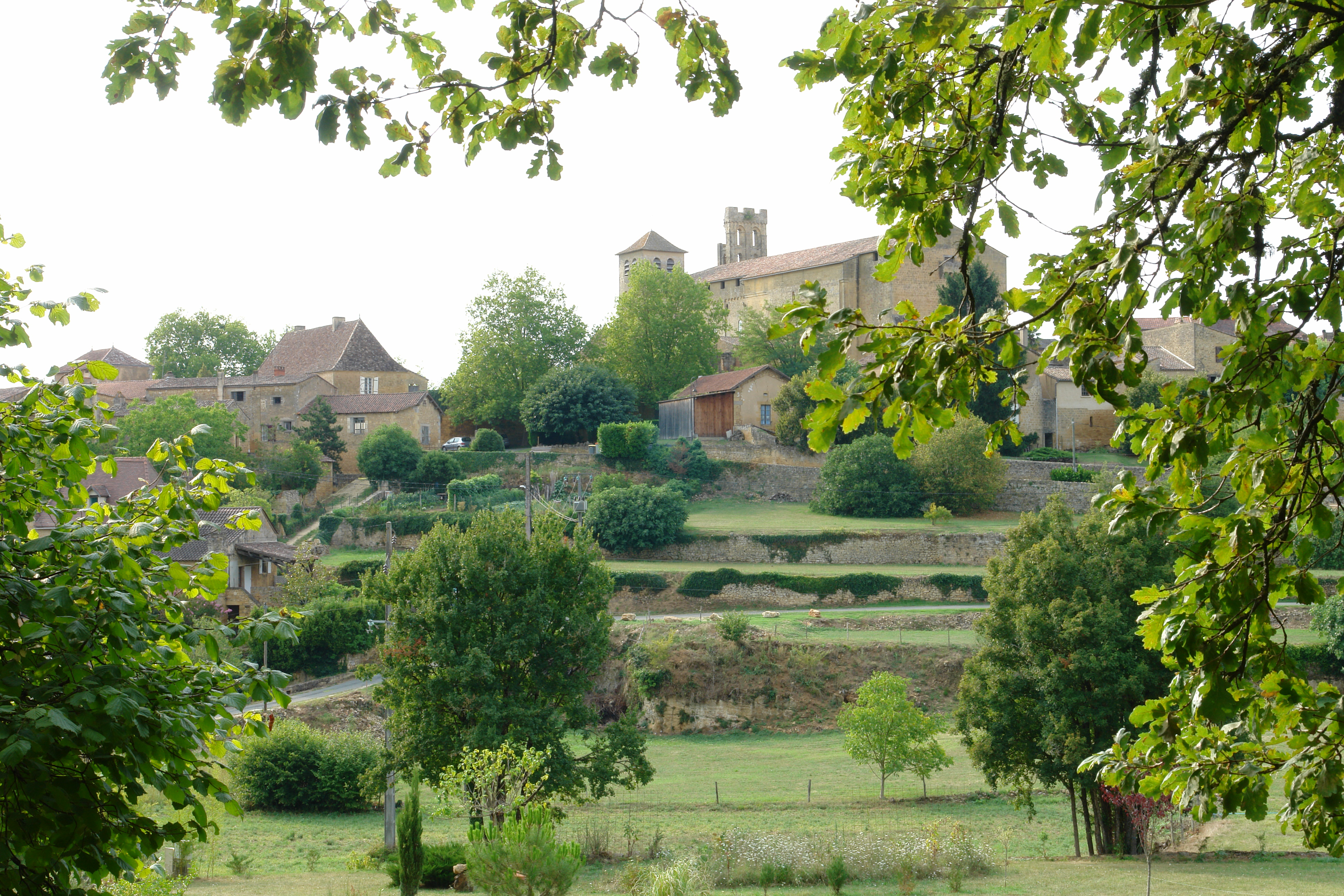
View from the southeast

The village is located on a plateau near the Couze Valley. In the past, the place was called "Mount Dauriac".

== History ==
=== Prehistory ===
The site of Combe-Capelle has been excavated near the Couze Valley, next to the border with the commune of Montferrand-du-Périgord. The place was occupied during the Upper Paleolithic period.

=== Middle Ages ===
==== The legend of Avitus ====
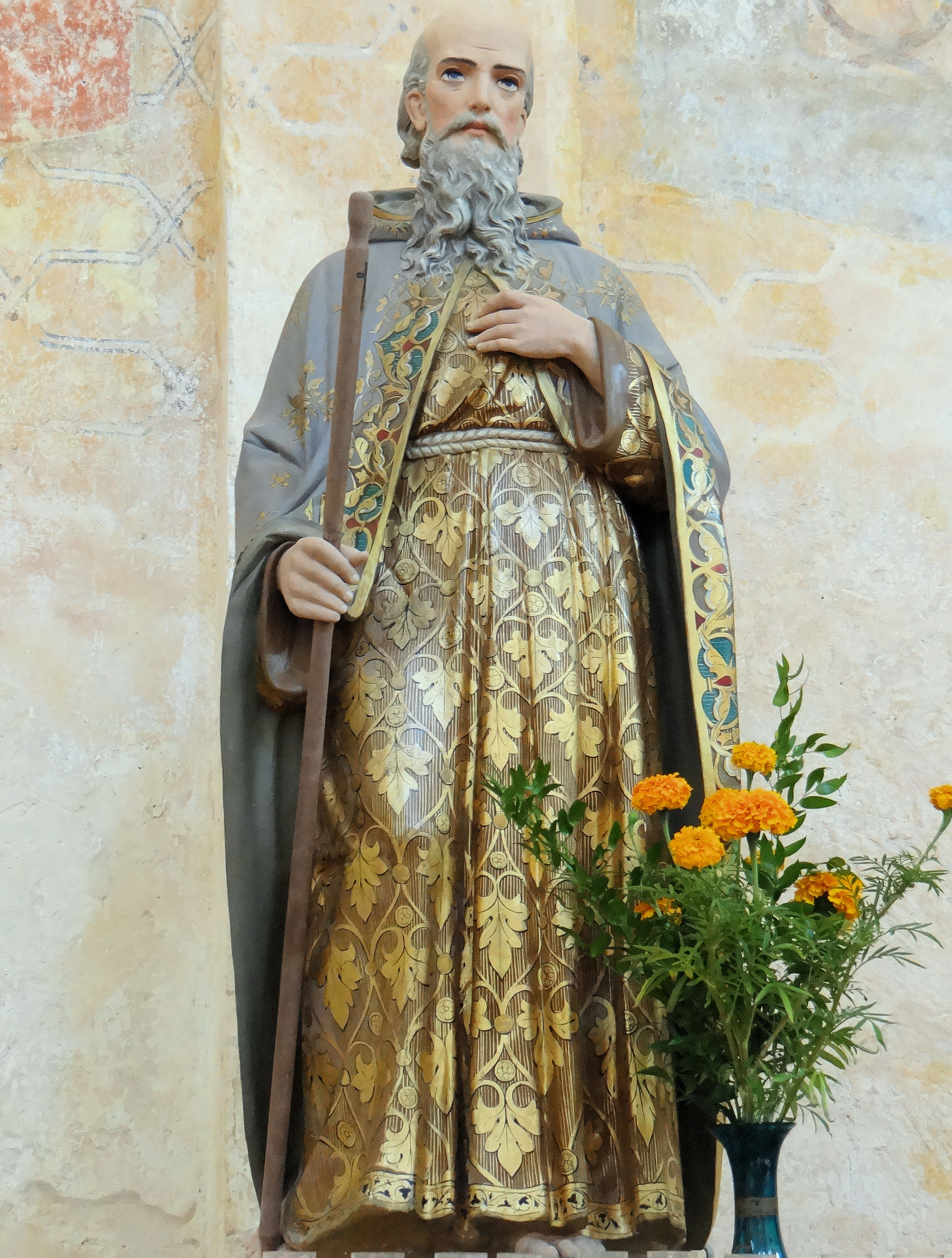
A statue of Saint-Avitus, visible inside the church

According to a hagiography, Avitus, a young aristocrat from Lanquais, was enlisted against his will in the Visigoth army (under Alaric II) against the Frank army of Clovis. The army of Clovis was trying to conquer the South-West of France at this time.

At the Battle of Vouillé in 507, Avitus, taken prisoner by the Franks, converted to Christianity. When freed, he had a dream that he should return to his homeland, and walk in the local woods until he received a sign. He rested in a cave next to a spring, looking out towards a hill, the Mount Dauriac (the site of the present village), where a pagan temple had been built. He recited a prayer and the pagan temple collapsed. Avitus then became a thaumaturge and healer. At his death in 570, he was celebrated like a saint. Monks came to settle near the cave, where he had built an oratory.

==== The first church ====
After the death of Avitus, a first church, called "Notre-Dame-du-Val", was built near his retreat, but was destroyed in the 9th or 10th century, probably by the Normans. According to an engraved stone still to be seen in the present church, the body of Avit was moved a few kilometers away to the hamlet of Saint-Cernin, now in the commune of Labouquerie. After the destruction of the first church, the primitive village declined, and the monks moved to settle on Mount Dauriac.

==== The Route de Compostella and the new church ====
A first romanesque church was built in the 11th century on Mount Dauriac, on the site of the current church.

Many pilgrims came here because of the notoriety of Avitus, and because the village was situated on the Route de Compostella (Way of St. James). To accommodate all these pilgrims, another, larger church was built to replace the existing one, again using the same site, at the end of the 11th and beginning of the 12th century.

==== Destruction of the buildings ====
===== 12th or 13th centuries =====
According to the evidence of fire on the walls (the stonework still retains a pink colouration), some of the village and the abbey buildings were partially destroyed in the 12th and 13th centuries. Several hypotheses have been made as to who carried out these attacks: probably either pillage by the cathars or the consequence of the Hundred Years' War.

===== 16th century =====
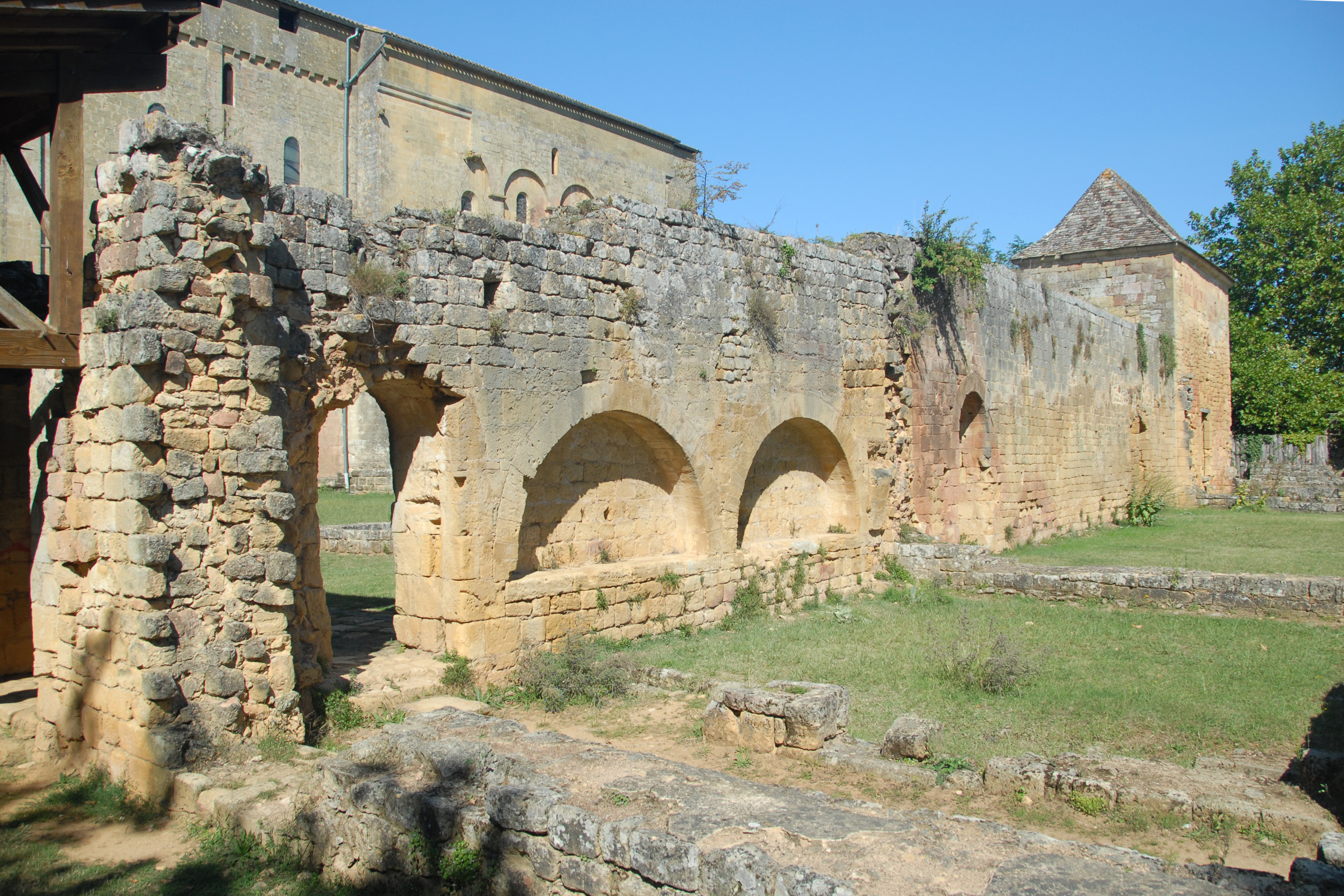
Ruins of the cloister

During the religious wars, in 1577, the lord of Commarque and some Protestants entered the abbey, destroyed a large part of the buildings and killed the priests.

The chapter was suppressed in 1695.

==== Recent history ====
In 1862, the church was classified as a "Monument historique". At the end of the 19th century, the church was restored by the architect Henri Rapine. Archaeological excavations during the 1960s found what could be the remains of a pagan temple - tiles similar to those used by the Romans, and holes that could have contained pillars. This temple could have existed before the church and was possibly destroyed by an earthquake - giving rise to the legend of St Avitus.

== Places and monuments ==
=== The church ===
==== The primitive church ====
On the site of the current church, a primitive church existed up to the middle of the 11th century. A part of its southern wall is still visible in the wall of the current church. This primitive church was probably erected by monks of the Order of Saint Benedict.

==== The current church ====
The current church was erected during the Romanesque period, at the end of the 11th century and beginning of the 12th. At the beginning of the 12th century, the body of Avitus was transferred here, according to an engraved stone in the wall of the church. The building was erected by canons of Saint Augustine.

==== The outside ====
- Western façade

The North tower was partially destroyed during the religious wars.

- Southern wall

This wall is adjoined to the ruins of the cloister. There are marks of fire in its lower part. The fire could have been caused by either the Cathars in 1214 or the English in 1442 during the Hundred Years' War.

- Eastern apse

A few tombs of monks and aristocrats are located at the bottom of the apse.

==== The inside ====
Three bays are delimited by massive pillars. These pillars were probably made to support domes, but they currently carry rib vaults. Unlike the wall and pillars, these vaults do not exhibit the red marks of the 13th-century fire, so it is possible that the building was initially covered by domes until the fire, as in the cathedrals of Périgueux and Cahors.

The figures at the top of the vaults show a blessing hand, a standing character and a Lamb of God. Paintings are also visible on the walls, among them a representation of Saint Christopher. The holy water font at the entrance is from the 9th century. Therefore, it is possible that it was moved from the previous church Notre-Dame-du-Val. The altar is contemporary (end of the 20th century). The flat apse ('chevet' or 'head' of the building) is dated 1577 and was therefore constructed after the Wars of Religion.

=== Ruins of the abbey ===
Only the external walls remain of the cloister adjoining the South wall of the church. Inside these walls can be seen holes for the beams that used to support the roof of the cloister. The cloister was used as a cemetery from 1659 to 1923.

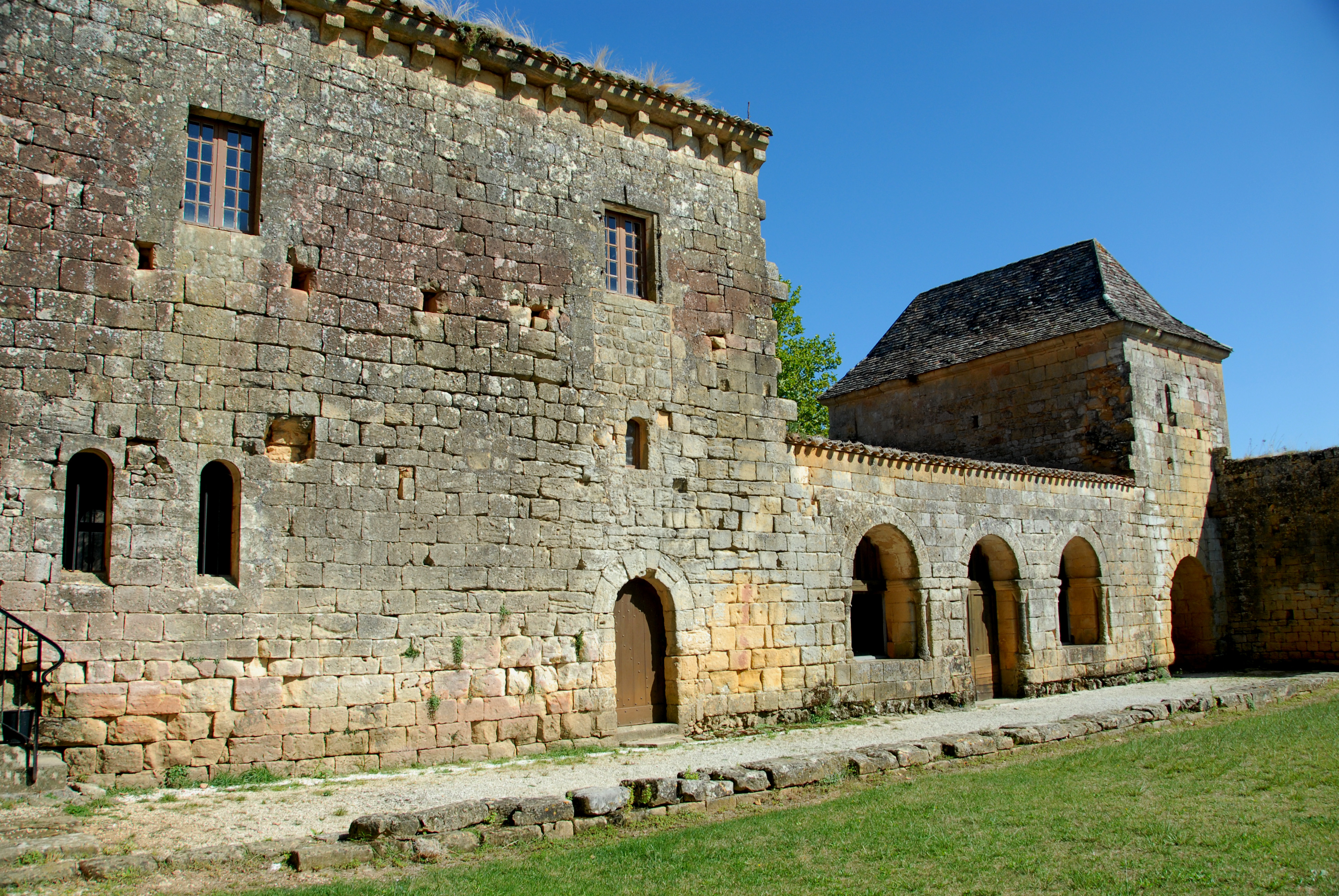
The sacristy and the dormitory on the left, the chapter house on the right

The chapter house still remains, containing a small museum with the remains from the 20th-century archaeological excavations. Between the chapter house and the church, the sacristy and above, the former dormitory of the monks also remain. Inside the dormitory is a small geological museum (donated by Jean Capelle).

Next to the chapter house, the entrance porch is also visible.

On the South wall of the cloister, remains of several rooms can be seen in the walls and on the ground: the kitchen (remains of a bread owen), the dining room, the scriptorium, and the cellar (now covered).

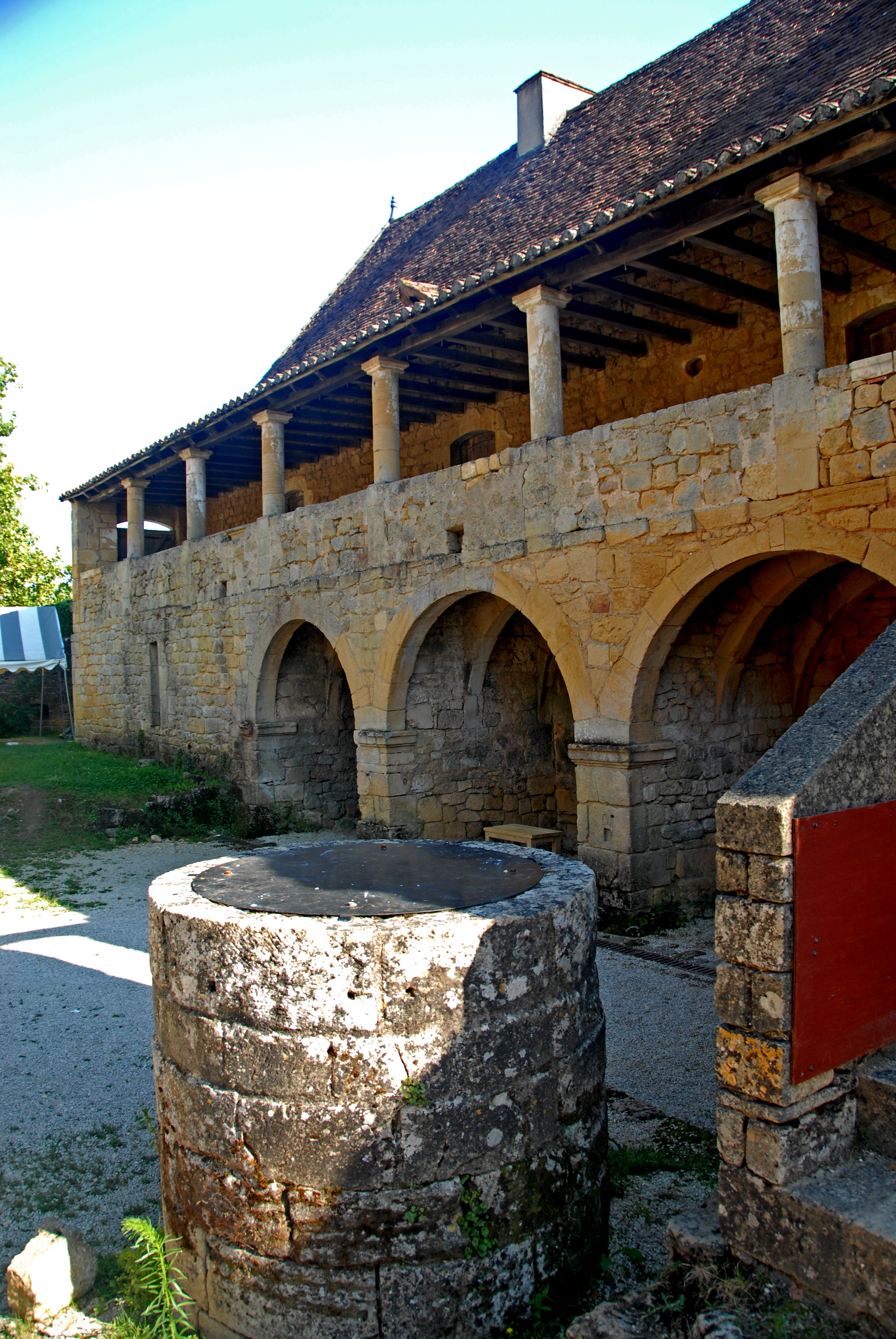
The rectory

To the South an old rectory from the 17th century (the first floor is probably older) is used today for temporary exhibitions. The rectory is surrounded by fortified walls. To its west, more remains of foundations, possibly of houses, can be seen.

=== Place du fort ===
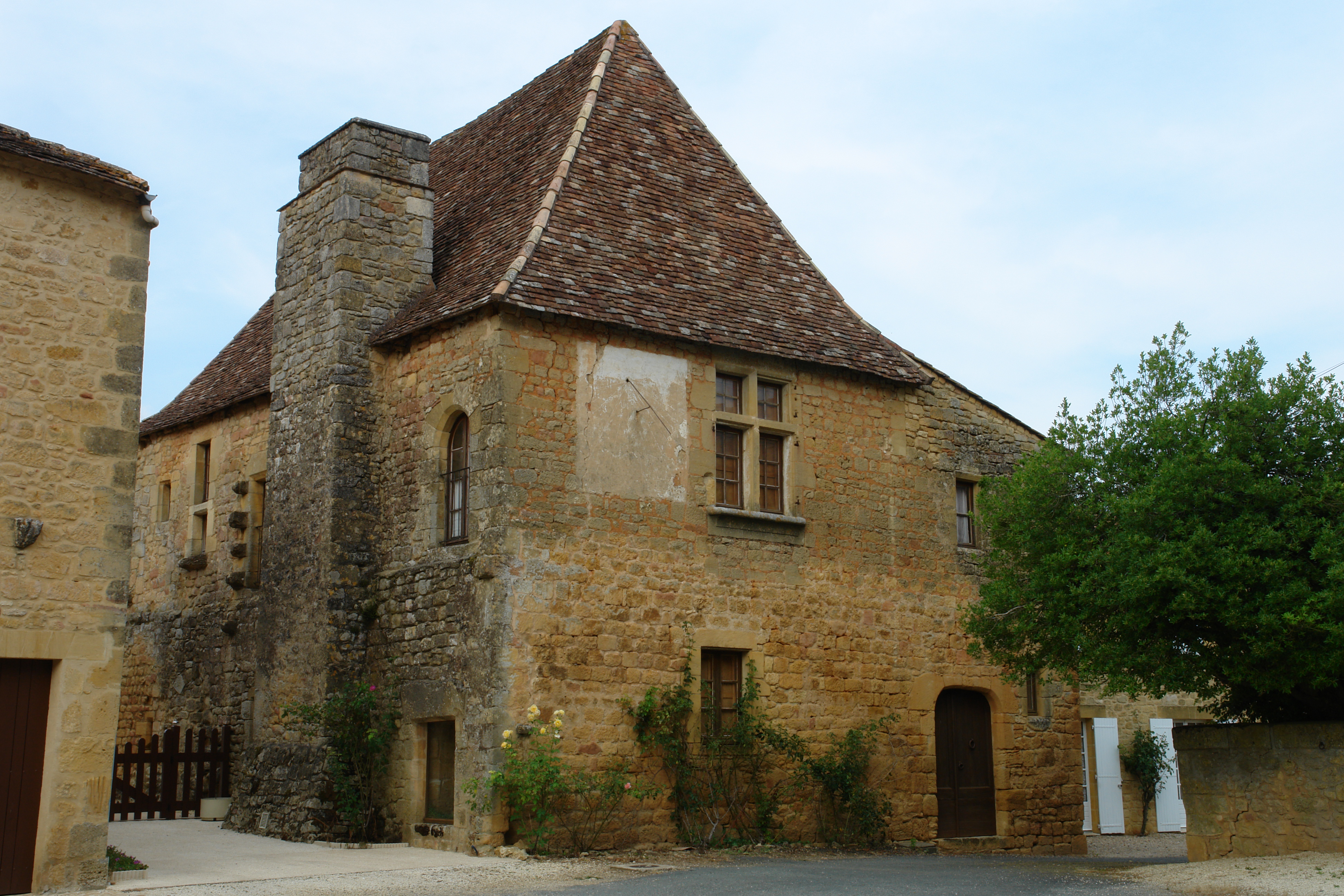
House with a sundial

This square lies to the North of the church. Old houses with gothic or renaissance windows, a fragment of the 14th-century wall and a sundial can be seen there. One of the house has the inscription "Chanoine Fadelpech 1628" ("chanoine" is a 'canon').

== Population ==
Historical population
Year	Pop.	±% p.a.
1968	464	—
1975	394	−2.31%
1982	385	−0.33%
1990	365	−0.66%
1999	403	+1.11%
2007	436	+0.99%
2012	460	+1.08%
2017	439	−0.93%
2023	422	−0.66%
Source: INSEE

== See also ==
- Communes of the Dordogne department
