= Sainte-Croix, Dordogne =

Sainte-Croix
- Commune
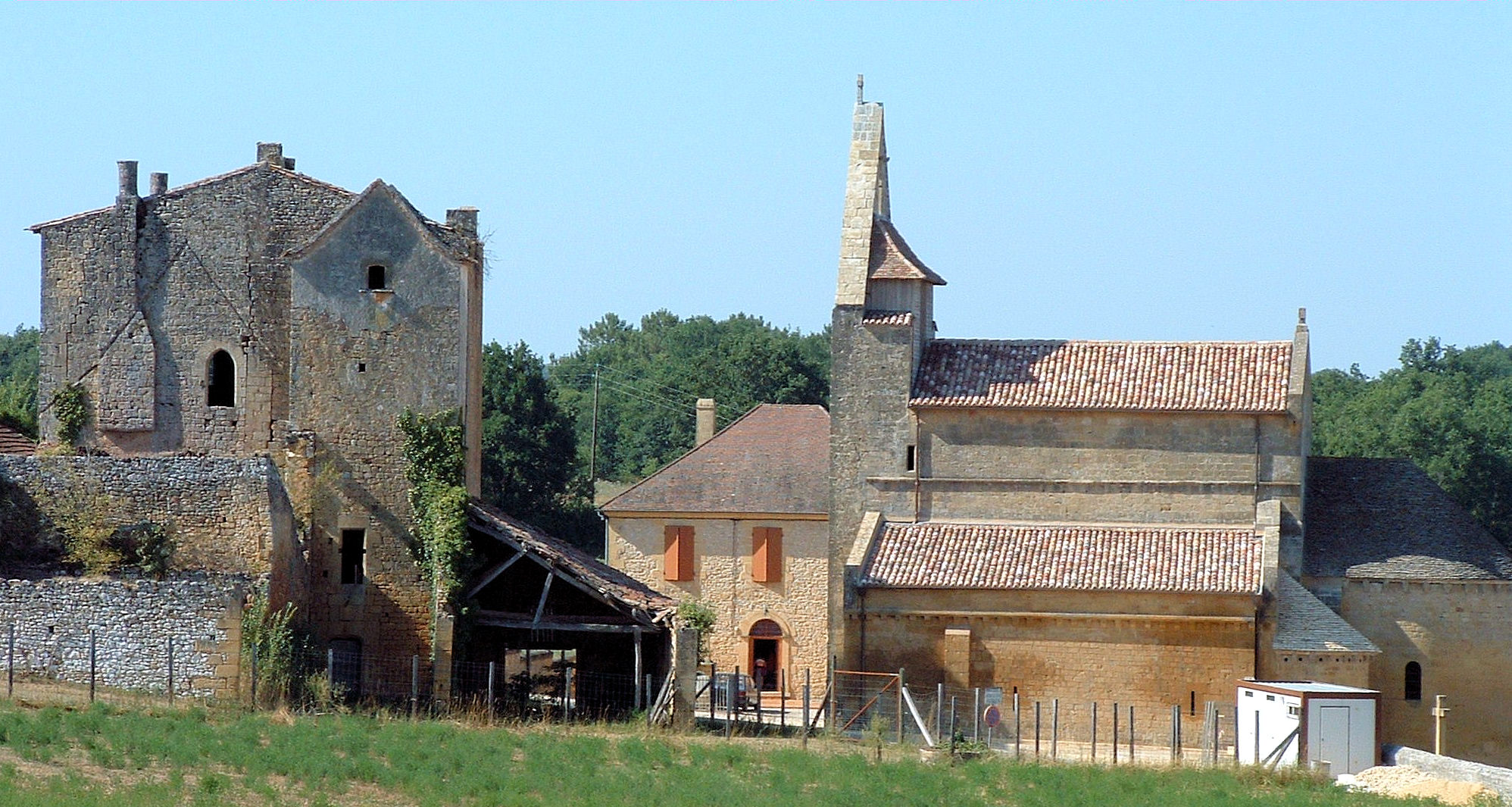
- Church and priory
- Location of Sainte-Croix
- Location within France Location within Nouvelle-Aquitaine
- Coordinates: 44°44′26″N 0°49′54″E
- Country: France
- Region: Nouvelle-Aquitaine
- Department: Dordogne
- Arrondissement: Bergerac
- Canton: Lalinde

Government
  - Mayor (2020–2026): Francis Montaudouin
- Area^{1}: 12.87 km^{2} (4.97 sq mi)
- Elevation: 165 m (541 ft)
- Highest elevation: 209 m (686 ft)
- Lowest elevation: 80 m (260 ft)
- Population (2023): 89
  - Density: 6.9/km^{2} (18/sq mi)
- Time zone: UTC+01:00 (CET)
  - Summer (DST): UTC+02:00 (CEST)
- INSEE/Postal code: 24393 /24440
- ^{1} French Land Register data, which excludes lakes, ponds, glaciers > 1 km^{2} (0.386 sq mi or 247 acres) and river estuaries.

Sainte-Croix (French pronunciation: [sɛ̃t kʁwa]; also Sainte-Croix-de-Beaumont; Languedocien: Senta Crotz) is a commune in the Dordogne department in Nouvelle-Aquitaine in southwestern France.

The village has an ancient church and attached building that used to belong to the Knights Templar. The mayor of Sainte-Croix is Francis Montaudouin, elected in 2020. Sainte-Croix lies about 3 km to the east of the D660 road that links Beaumont-du-Périgord in the north and Monpazier in the south.

== Population ==
Historical population
Year	Pop.	±% p.a.
1968	113	—
1975	91	−3.05%
1982	84	−1.14%
1990	94	+1.42%
1999	95	+0.12%
2007	91	−0.54%
2012	87	−0.89%
2017	87	+0.00%
2023	89	+0.38%
Source: INSEE

== See also ==
- Barjou
- Communes of the Dordogne department
