= Barjou =

Coordinates: 44°42′52″N 0°49′8″E

Barjou (French pronunciation: [baʁʒu]) is a hamlet in France that lies just off the main D66 road linking Beaumontois-en-Périgord and Monpazier. It is 9 km from Monpazier and about the same distance to Beaumont. Administratively, it is part of the commune of Sainte-Croix, in the Dordogne département.

A number of the existing farmhouses and barns have been renovated or adapted since the 1970s and are owned by overseas residents, and the remaining residents are French families. Some farming still exists and there is a walnut orchard at the entrance to the village from the D660.

Until the 1980s the 'place' at the centre of the hamlet was dominated by elm trees, which are now gone, as a result of Dutch Elm Disease. Since the building of the D66 road, the ancient highway between Beaumont and Monpazier has become little more than a walking route and passes close to and through some gardens.

The French adjective for a resident of Barjou is Barjovin (m) or Barjovine (f).

== See also ==
- Ste Croix de Beaumont
