= Jeanne-Germaine Castang =

French Roman Catholic nun

Blessed Jeanne-Germaine Castang O.S.C.
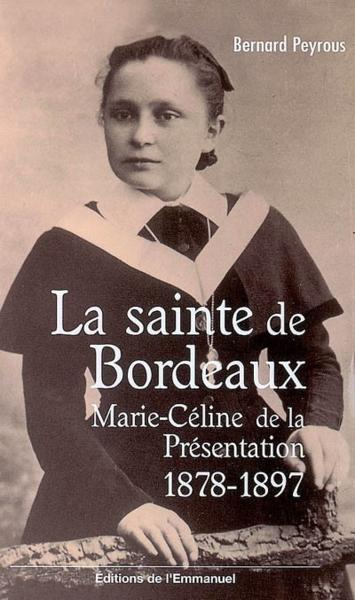

Religious
- Born: 23 May 1878; Nojals-et-Clotte, Dordogne, French Third Republic
- Died: 30 May 1897 (aged 19); Bordeaux, Gironde, French Third Republic
- Beatified: 16 September 2007, Bordeaux Cathedral, France by Cardinal José Saraiva Martins
- Feast: 30 May

Jeanne-Germaine Castang (24 May 1878 – 30 May 1897) – in religious Marie-Céline of the Presentation – was a French Roman Catholic nun from the Poor Clares. Her childhood was marked with lameness and she suffered a noticeable limp for the remainder of her life after contracting the disease in 1882 and an operation for pain relief in 1891. Her desire for the religious life began in her childhood and after being turned from the Sisters of Saint Joseph she managed to be admitted into the Poor Clares where she soon became ill with tuberculosis. She was permitted to make her vows well before the usual time since she was in poor health.

Castang's beatification cause opened on 18 June 1930 and her beatification was celebrated in the Bordeaux Cathedral on 16 September 2007.

== Life ==
Jenne-Germaine Castang was born in mid-1878 as the fifth child of eleven children. Her father was a small landowner and her mother was born to notaries. Out of the eleven children three died at Nojals-et-Clotte and two others in Bordeaux from tuberculosis and malnutrition. The eldest daughter was able to join the convent of the Sisters of Saint Joseph at Aubenas. In her childhood she was noted for her strong and pious character as well as for her attentiveness to the needs of others.

In 1882 Castang was infected with polio that froze her left leg and with a permanent limp. The girl came home with some friends but one suggested that all go paddling in an ice-cold stream; she was eager to join them but felt unwell afterwards and a serious leg problem arose not long after this incident. However she continued her education which first came from her parents and then from the Sisters of Saint Joseph where she was noted for her pious nature and for her strong devotion to the Eucharist. Her father was unsuccessful with the store that he had opened and so all were forced to relocate to a damp and dilapidated barn in 1887; he had become irritable and was sometimes harsh with his gentle wife which led to criticism of him though she herself never criticized her father having understood his situation. Their situation grew far worse when her father's creditors grew impatient and oversaw the sale of his land and home to make up for the debt. Their condition was so dire that she went out to beg for food and travelled from one farm to another looking for scraps despite a festering sore on her bad foot. Her father made bad deals and left home to seek work at Bordeaux as a baker where his wife and children later joined him in the spring of 1890; he later found work as a doorkeeper at a castle in La Réole but she remained in Bordeaux. In her childhood she desired to become a nun and had hoped to join the Poor Clares.

Castang prepared for and received both her First Communion and Confirmation in Bordeaux and spent an extended period of time as a boarder with the Sisters of Nazareth from 1892 until 1897. In 1891 she underwent an orthopedic operation to relieve the pain of her polio and it managed to ease her pain and her walking. Three little brothers died in the months following this and her eldest brother had returned form his time in the armed services in poor health. Upon the death of her mother in December 1892 she came home to care for her older brother who was suffering from tuberculosis and died from it in 1893. It was at this stage of her life that she herself contracted the disease too but after she recovered from it tried to join her sister in the Sisters of Joseph at Aubenas but was rejected because of her being disabled. In Bordeaux she had the chance through a friend to visit the Poor Clares in their Ave Maria convent at Talence near Bordeaux. The Mother Superior discerned in her a remarkable vocation and she was admitted into the convent on 12 June 1896 where she took her vows on 21 November 1896 under the religious name of "Marie-Céline of the Presentation". But she was afflicted with tuberculosis in addition to her other disabilities and she bore with patience the rigor of the life of a contemplative nun.

The doctor was summoned after the Mother Superior became aware of the deterioration of her health but this was to no avail. Castang was permitted to make her final vows on her deathbed in articulo mortis or "in the face of death". The diagnosis that was given was tuberculosis of the bone and she died in Talence in mid-1897. Upon her death sweet odors emitted which earned her the name: "Saint of the Perfumes". Her burial place at the convent in Talence became a pilgrimage destination. In June 2006 her remains were transferred to the parish church at Nojals-et-Clottes.

== Beatification ==
The beatification process opened in Bordeaux in an informative process that spanned from 1910 until its closure in 1914 while a decree was issued that dispensed from an apostolic process being held. Castang's spiritual writings received theological approval – it was determined her writings did not contravene official teachings – on 22 December 1926. The formal introduction to the cause came under Pope Pius XI on 18 June 1930 and she became titled as a Servant of God. The Congregation for Rites validated the informative process in Rome on 13 April 1945 and it had to pass three committees: the antepreparatory one met and approved the cause on 31 July 1941 as did the preparatory one on 28 October 1952 and the general one on 10 April 1956. The confirmation of her life of heroic virtue allowed for Pope Pius XII to name her as Venerable on 22 January 1957.

The process for a miracle attributed to Castang took place in France in 1946 and it received validation from the Congregation for the Causes of Saints on 20 February 2004. Medical experts approved this on 27 January 2005 as did theologians on 24 January 2006 and the C.C.S. on 14 November 2006. Pope Benedict XVI approved this healing to be a miracle on 16 December 2006 and the beatification was therefore confirmed. Cardinal José Saraiva Martins presided over the beatification in the Bordeaux Cathedral on the pope's behalf on 16 September 2007. The Cardinal Archbishop of Bordeaux Jean-Pierre Ricard was also in attendance at the beatification.

The current postulator for the cause is the Franciscan friar Giovangiuseppe Califano.
