= Chidrac =

Former commune in Auvergne-Rhône-Alpes, France

- Part of Les Deux-Rives
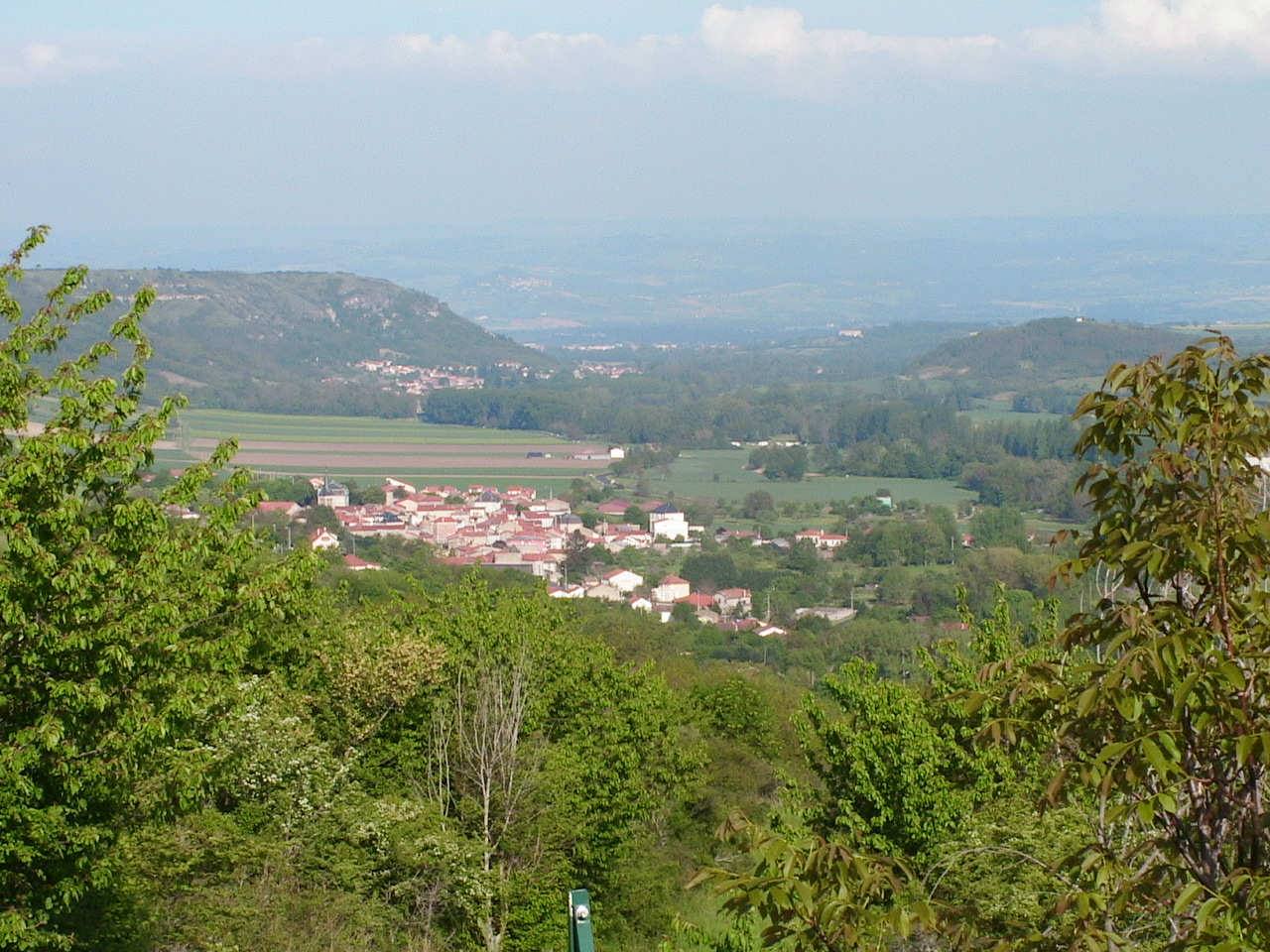
- View of Chidrac from Lavelle
- Location of Chidrac
- Location within France Location within Auvergne-Rhône-Alpes
- Coordinates: 45°33′18″N 3°08′59″E
- Country: France
- Region: Auvergne-Rhône-Alpes
- Department: Puy-de-Dôme
- Arrondissement: Issoire
- Canton: Le Sancy
- Commune: Les Deux-Rives
- Area^{1}: 3.57 km^{2} (1.38 sq mi)
- Elevation: 446 m (1,463 ft)
- Highest elevation: 644 m (2,113 ft)
- Lowest elevation: 445 m (1,460 ft)
- Population (2022): 494
  - Density: 138/km^{2} (358/sq mi)
- Time zone: UTC+01:00 (CET)
  - Summer (DST): UTC+02:00 (CEST)
- Postal code: 63320
- ^{1} French Land Register data, which excludes lakes, ponds, glaciers > 1 km^{2} (0.386 sq mi or 247 acres) and river estuaries.

Chidrac (French pronunciation: [ʃidʁak]) is a former commune in the Puy-de-Dôme department in Auvergne-Rhône-Alpes in central France.

== Geography ==
The commune is located 8 kilometers west of Issoire. It is located on the Couze Pavin, a small waterway that flows into the Allier at Issoire.

== Population ==
Historical population
Year	Pop.	±% p.a.
1968	387	—
1975	371	−0.60%
1982	379	+0.31%
1990	397	+0.58%
1999	377	−0.57%
2007	473	+2.88%
2012	468	−0.21%
2017	523	+2.25%
Source: INSEE

== See also ==
- Communes of the Puy-de-Dôme department
