= Sainte-Sabine-Born =

- Part of Beaumontois-en-Périgord
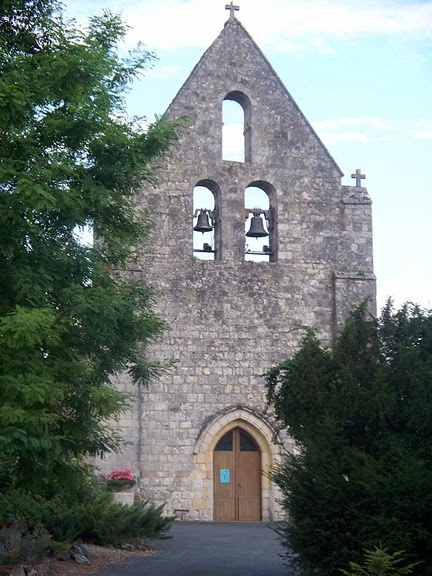
- Location of Sainte-Sabine-Born
- Location within France Location within Nouvelle-Aquitaine
- Coordinates: 44°41′38″N 0°45′09″E
- Country: France
- Region: Nouvelle-Aquitaine
- Department: Dordogne
- Arrondissement: Bergerac
- Canton: Lalinde
- Commune: Beaumontois-en-Périgord
- Area^{1}: 23.97 km^{2} (9.25 sq mi)
- Elevation: 133 m (436 ft)
- Highest elevation: 203 m (666 ft)
- Lowest elevation: 83 m (272 ft)
- Population (2023): 368
  - Density: 15.4/km^{2} (39.8/sq mi)
- Time zone: UTC+01:00 (CET)
  - Summer (DST): UTC+02:00 (CEST)
- Postal code: 24440
- ^{1} French Land Register data, which excludes lakes, ponds, glaciers > 1 km^{2} (0.386 sq mi or 247 acres) and river estuaries.

Sainte-Sabine-Born (French pronunciation: [sɛ̃t sabin bɔʁn]; Occitan: Senta Sabina e Bòrn) is a former commune in the Dordogne department in southwestern France. The commune was formed in 1974 from the former communes of Born-de-Champs and Sainte-Sabine. On 1 January 2016, it was merged into the new commune Beaumontois-en-Périgord.

== See also ==
- Communes of the Dordogne department
