= Les Deux-Rives =

- Commune
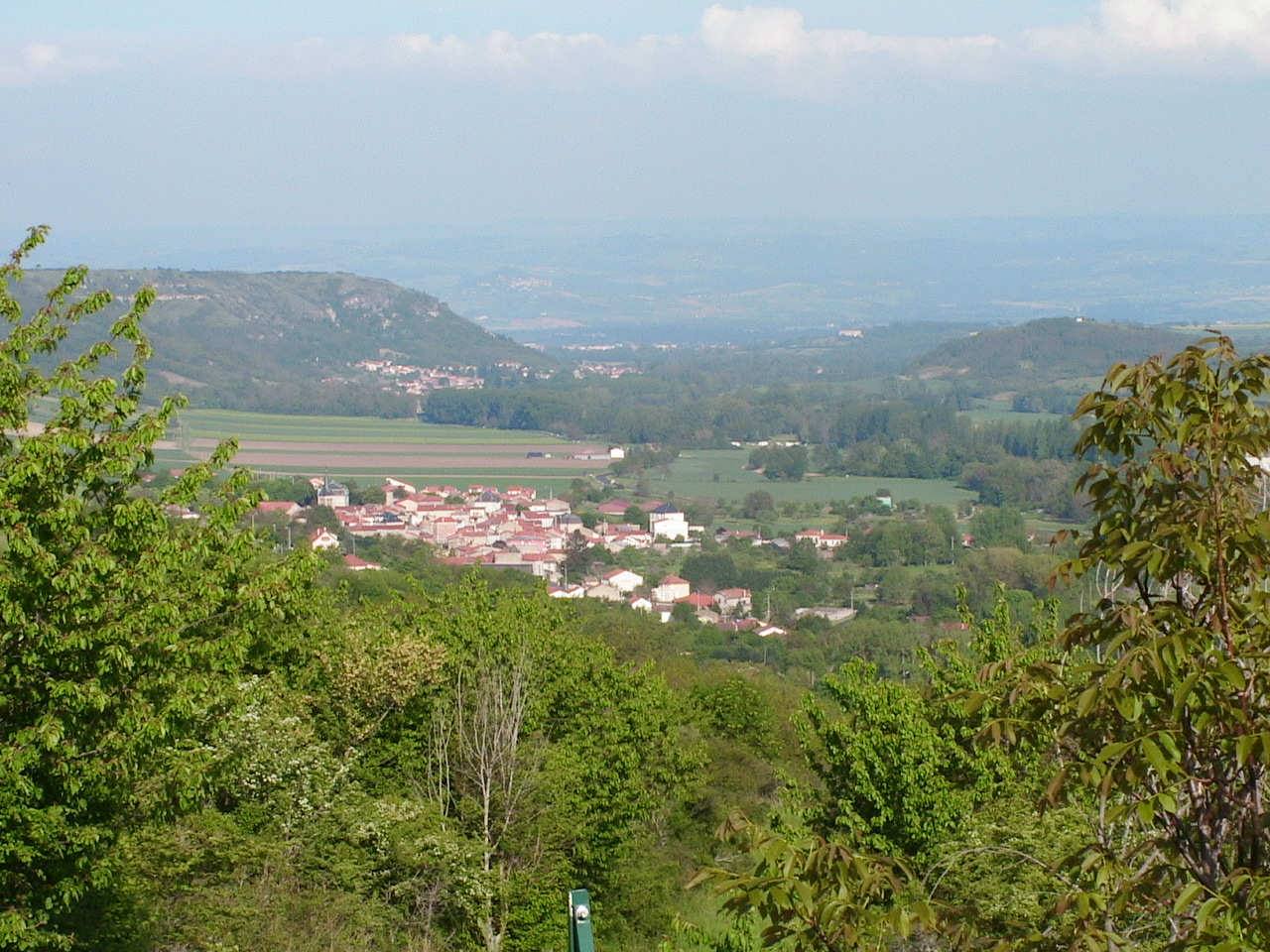
- View of Chidrac from Lavelle
- Location of Les Deux-Rives
- Location within France Location within Auvergne-Rhône-Alpes
- Coordinates: 45°33′18″N 3°08′59″E
- Country: France
- Region: Auvergne-Rhône-Alpes
- Department: Puy-de-Dôme
- Arrondissement: Issoire
- Canton: Le Sancy
- Intercommunality: Agglo Pays d'Issoire
- Area^{1}: 5.11 km^{2} (1.97 sq mi)
- Highest elevation: 644 m (2,113 ft)
- Lowest elevation: 445 m (1,460 ft)
- Population (2023): 825
  - Density: 161/km^{2} (418/sq mi)
- Time zone: UTC+01:00 (CET)
  - Summer (DST): UTC+02:00 (CEST)
- INSEE/Postal code: 63109 /63320
- ^{1} French Land Register data, which excludes lakes, ponds, glaciers > 1 km^{2} (0.386 sq mi or 247 acres) and river estuaries.

Les Deux-Rives (French pronunciation: [le dø ʁiv], lit. 'The Two Banks') is a commune in the Puy-de-Dôme department in Auvergne-Rhône-Alpes in central France. It was formed on 1 January 2025, with the merger of Chidrac and Saint-Cirgues-sur-Couze.

== See also ==
- Communes of the Puy-de-Dôme department
