= Claude Bérit-Débat =

French politician

Member of the French Senate for Dordogne
- In office 1 October 2008 – 27 September 2020
- Preceded by: Dominique Mortemousque
- Succeeded by: Serge Mérillou

Personal details
- Born: 19 February 1946 (age 79) Mirepeix, France
- Party: Socialist Party

Claude Bérit-Débat (born 19 February 1946) is a member of the Senate of France, representing the Dordogne department. He is a member of the Socialist Party.

== Bibliography ==
- Page on the Senate website
