= Arthur J. Jelinek =

American anthropologist (1928–2022)

Arthur J. Jelinek (July 19, 1928 – January 10, 2022) was an American anthropologist specializing in the Eurasian paleolithic.

== Early years ==
Jelinek was born in Chicago but grew up in a suburb, La Grange, attending Lyons Township High School. After high school, he entered the U.S. Marines.

== Education ==
Jelinek briefly attended the Colorado School of Mines before transferring to the University of New Mexico, from which he obtained a B.A. degree in 1952. In 1960, he got his Ph.D. from the University of Michigan, studying under James Griffin. His dissertation was on an American archaeological topic, An Archaeological Survey of the Middle Pecos River Valley and the Adjacent Llanos Estacado.

== Professional career ==
Jelinek taught at Beloit College, the University of Chicago, and the University of Michigan. His final years were spent at the University of Arizona, where he was a professor and professor emeritus. Although primarily an expert in the Old World Paleolithic, Jelinek also maintained a research interest in North American archaeology.

== Honors ==
- University of Arizona Department of Anthropology Raymond H. Thompson Award for Distinguished Service to Anthropology.

== Selected publications ==
- "‘Fire at will’: The Emergence of Habitual Fire Use 350,000 Years Ago,"

Journal of Human Evolution 77:196-203 (2014). (co-author) DOI:10.1016/j.jhevol.2014.07.005

- Neandertal Lithic Industries at La Quina (2013, University of Arizona Press)
- "The Lower Paleolithic: Current Evidence and Interpretations," Annual Review of Anthropology6(1):11-32 (2003). DOI:10.1146/annurev.an.06.100177.000303

== Additional material ==
- Interview: https://www.youtube.com/watch? (Part 1) and v=BMMdKw3qMZw https://www.youtube.com/watch?v=23yQIPGfDiU (Part 2)
- Obituary: https://www.paleoanthropology.org/ojs/index.php/paleo/article/view/107/89
