= Labouquerie =

- Part of Beaumontois-en-Périgord
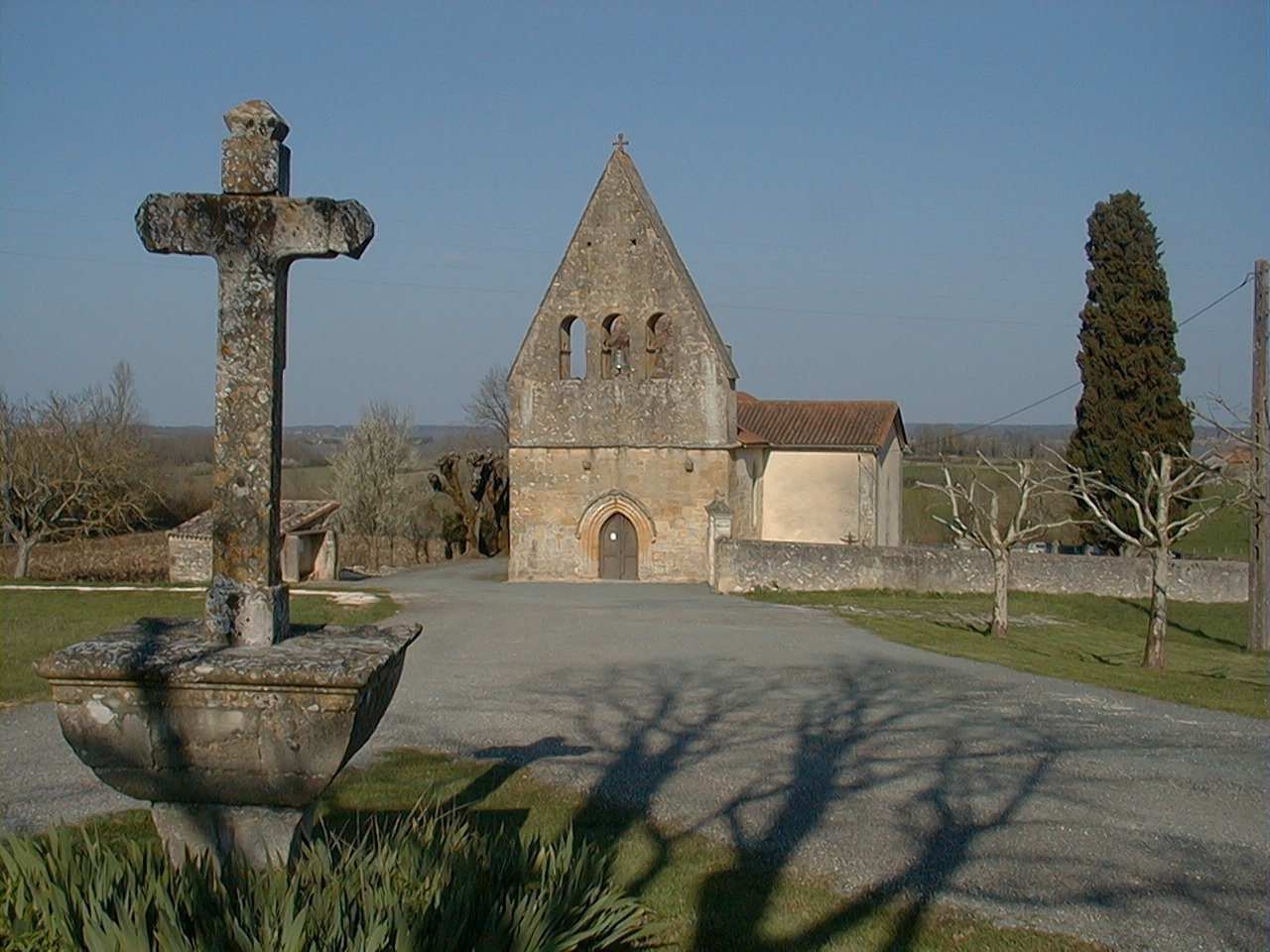
- Location of Labouquerie
- Location within France Location within Nouvelle-Aquitaine
- Coordinates: 44°44′36″N 0°47′47″E
- Country: France
- Region: Nouvelle-Aquitaine
- Department: Dordogne
- Arrondissement: Bergerac
- Canton: Lalinde
- Commune: Beaumontois-en-Périgord
- Area^{1}: 10.76 km^{2} (4.15 sq mi)
- Elevation: 115 m (377 ft)
- Highest elevation: 215 m (705 ft)
- Lowest elevation: 66 m (217 ft)
- Population (2023): 205
  - Density: 19.1/km^{2} (49.3/sq mi)
- Time zone: UTC+01:00 (CET)
  - Summer (DST): UTC+02:00 (CEST)
- Postal code: 24440
- ^{1} French Land Register data, which excludes lakes, ponds, glaciers > 1 km^{2} (0.386 sq mi or 247 acres) and river estuaries.

Labouquerie (French pronunciation: [labukʁi]; Occitan: La Bocariá) is a former commune in the Dordogne department in southwestern France. On 1 January 2016, it was merged into the new commune Beaumontois-en-Périgord.

== See also ==
- Communes of the Dordogne department
