= Saint-Cirgues-sur-Couze =

- Part of Les Deux-Rives
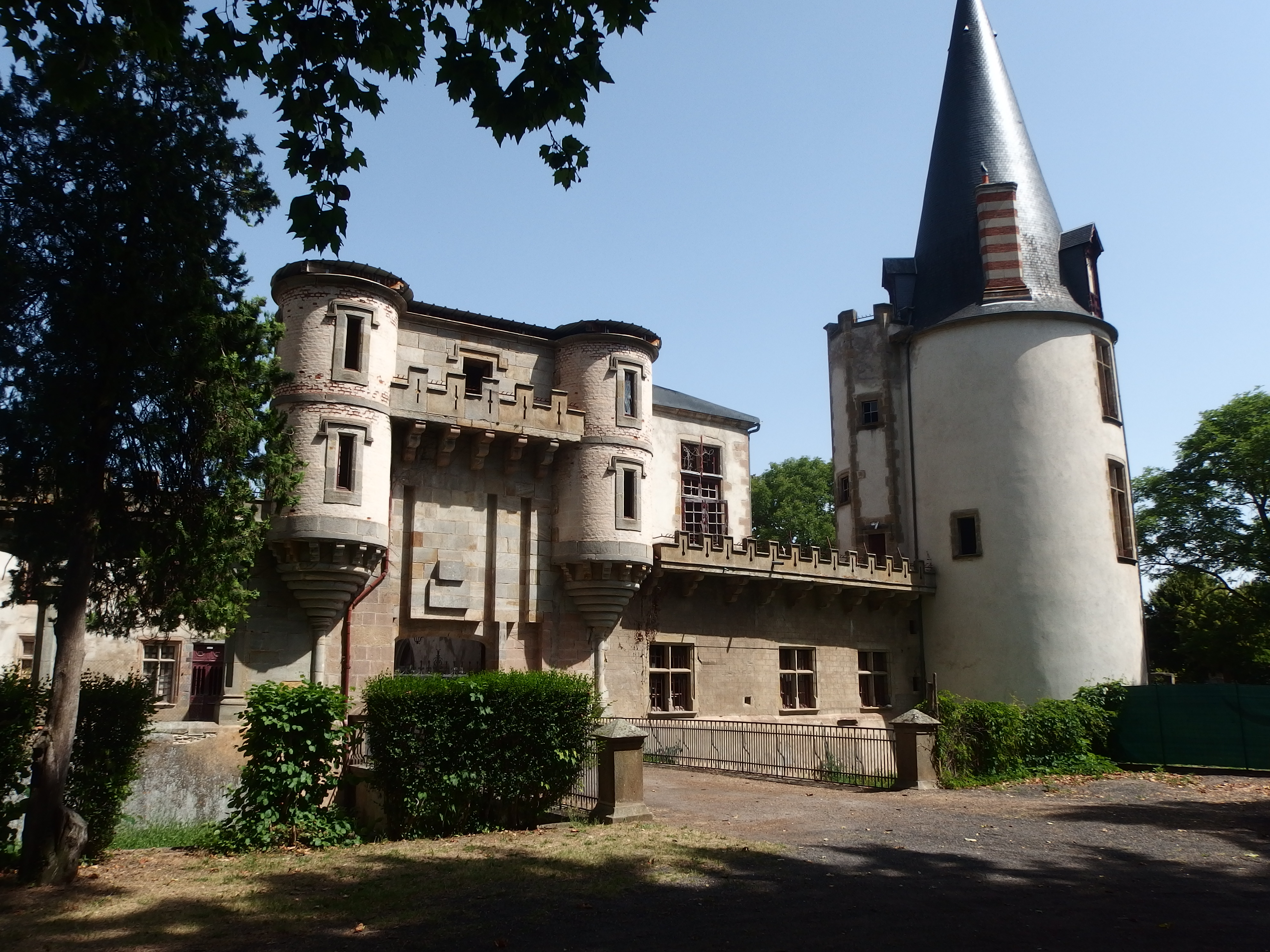
- The entrance to the chateau in Saint-Cirgues-sur-Couze
- Location of Saint-Cirgues-sur-Couze
- Location within France Location within Auvergne-Rhône-Alpes
- Coordinates: 45°33′00″N 3°08′35″E
- Country: France
- Region: Auvergne-Rhône-Alpes
- Department: Puy-de-Dôme
- Arrondissement: Issoire
- Canton: Le Sancy
- Commune: Les Deux-Rives
- Area^{1}: 12.34 km^{2} (4.76 sq mi)
- Elevation: 463 m (1,519 ft)
- Highest elevation: 622 m (2,041 ft)
- Lowest elevation: 449 m (1,473 ft)
- Population (2022): 348
  - Density: 28.2/km^{2} (73.0/sq mi)
- Time zone: UTC+01:00 (CET)
  - Summer (DST): UTC+02:00 (CEST)
- Postal code: 63320
- ^{1} French Land Register data, which excludes lakes, ponds, glaciers > 1 km^{2} (0.386 sq mi or 247 acres) and river estuaries.

Saint-Cirgues-sur-Couze (French pronunciation: [sɛ̃ siʁɡ syʁ kuz]; Occitan: Sent Cirgue de Cosa) is a former commune in the Puy-de-Dôme department in Auvergne in central France.

== See also ==
- Communes of the Puy-de-Dôme department
