= Nojals-et-Clotte =

- Part of Beaumontois-en-Périgord
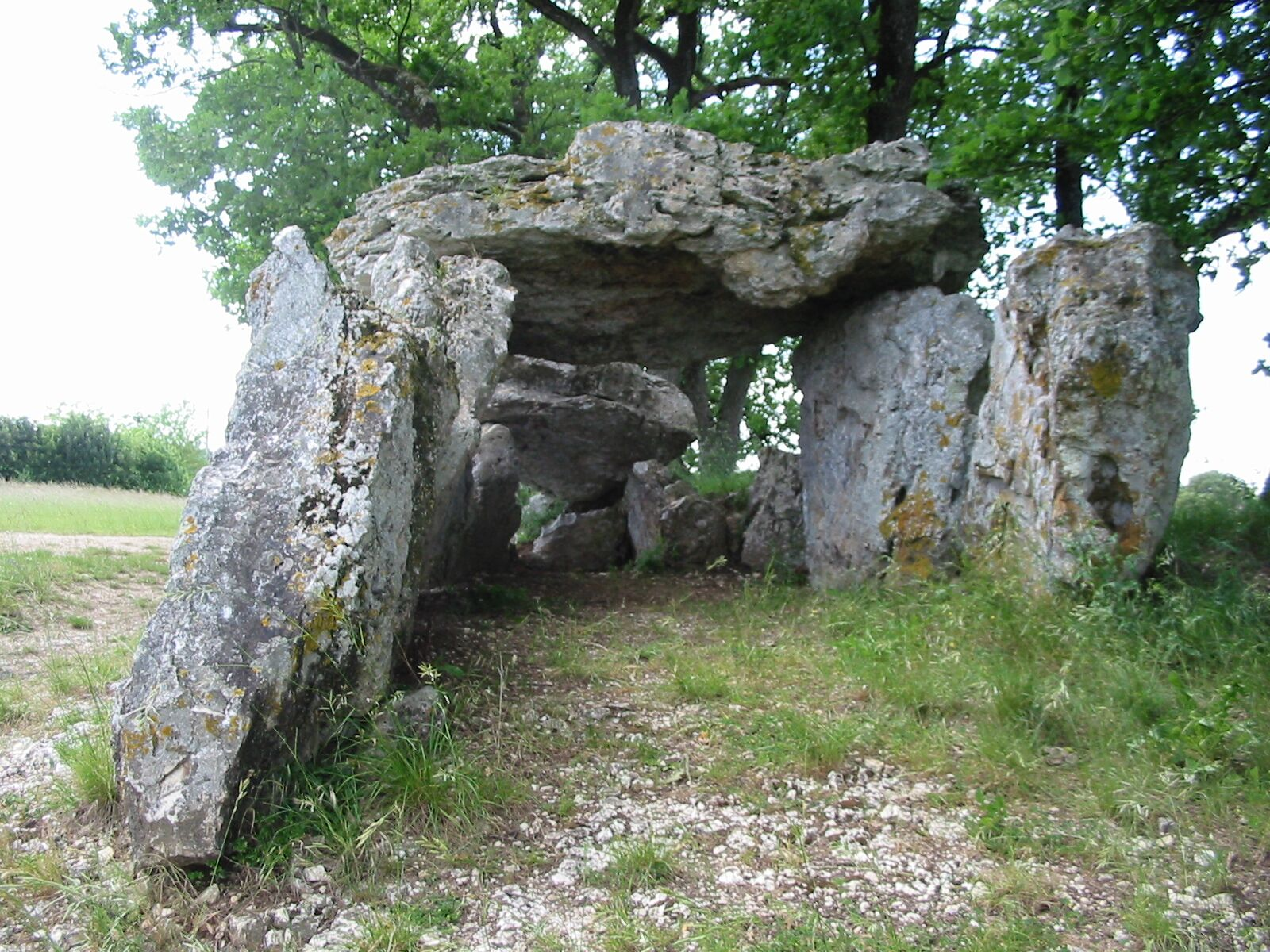
- Dolmen
- Location of Nojals-et-Clotte
- Location within France Location within Nouvelle-Aquitaine
- Coordinates: 44°43′33″N 0°45′33″E
- Country: France
- Region: Nouvelle-Aquitaine
- Department: Dordogne
- Arrondissement: Bergerac
- Canton: Lalinde
- Commune: Beaumontois-en-Périgord
- Area^{1}: 13.80 km^{2} (5.33 sq mi)
- Elevation: 156 m (512 ft)
- Highest elevation: 235 m (771 ft)
- Lowest elevation: 110 m (360 ft)
- Population (2023): 186
  - Density: 13.5/km^{2} (34.9/sq mi)
- Time zone: UTC+01:00 (CET)
  - Summer (DST): UTC+02:00 (CEST)
- Postal code: 24440
- ^{1} French Land Register data, which excludes lakes, ponds, glaciers > 1 km^{2} (0.386 sq mi or 247 acres) and river estuaries.

Nojals-et-Clotte (French pronunciation: [nɔʒal e klɔt]; Occitan: Nojals e Clòtas) is a former commune in the Dordogne department in southwestern France. On 1 January 2016, it was merged into the new commune Beaumontois-en-Périgord.

== See also ==
- Communes of the Dordogne department
