= Combe-Capelle =

Coordinates: 44°45′10″N 00°50′55″E

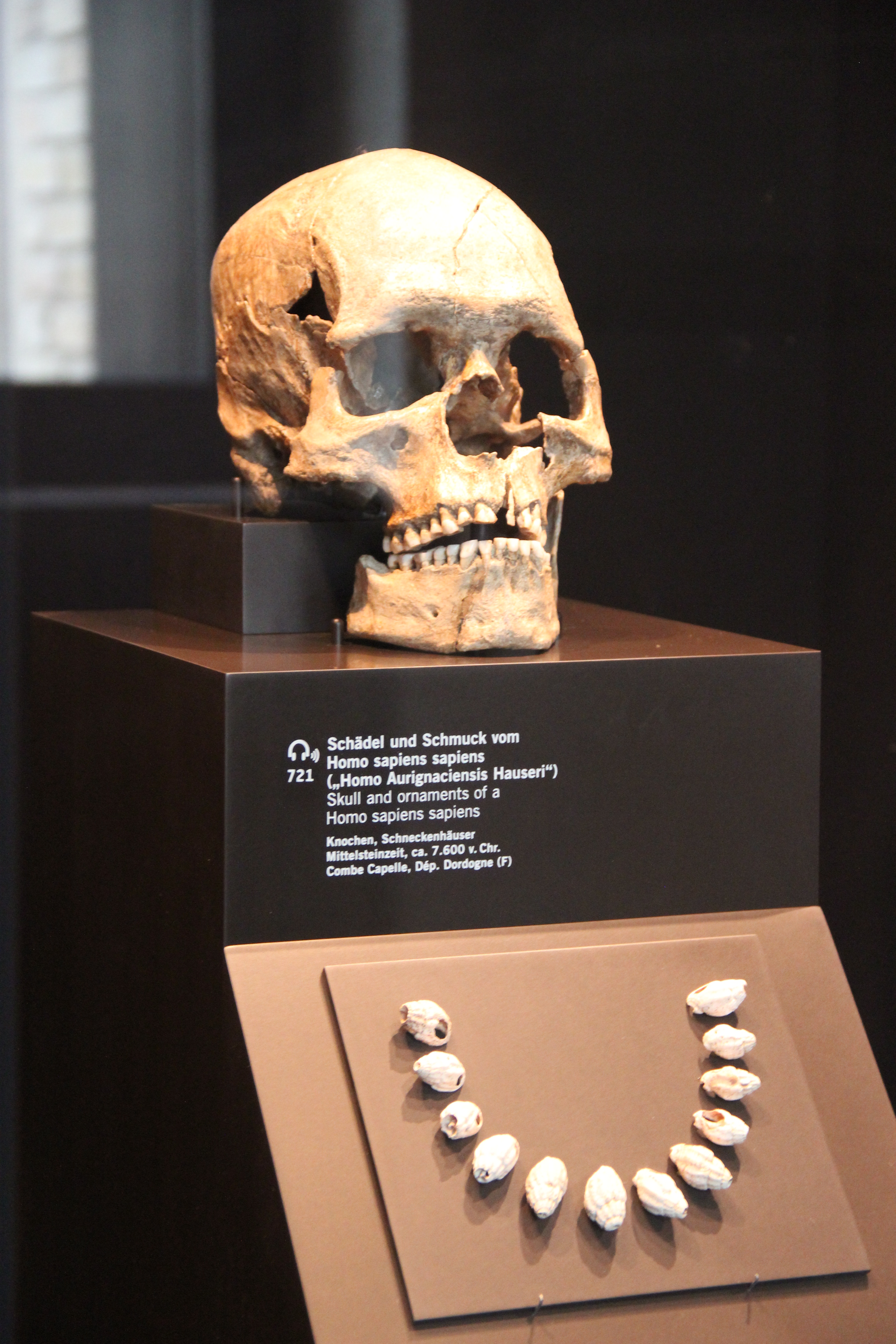
The fossil Homo sapiens from Combe Capelle with ornaments, 7,600 BC. Museum für Völkerkunde, Berlin

Combe-Capelle is a Paleolithic and Epipaleolithic site situated in the Couze valley in the Périgord region of Southern France. Henri-Marc Ami carried out excavations in the area from the late 1920s until his death in 1931.

The famous Homo sapiens fossil from Combe-Capelle, discovered in 1909 was sold to the Museum für Völkerkunde, Berlin, in 1910. It was for a long time considered to be 30,000 years old, an Upper Paleolithic Cro-Magnon man and one of the oldest finds of modern humans in Europe, formerly classified as Homo aurignaciensis hauseri. This was revised in a 2011 study, which dated collagen from a tooth of the skull in Berlin with accelerator mass spectrometry. The fossil was found to date to the early Holocene (Mesolithic Europe), at 9,500 years old.

== See also ==
- List of human evolution fossils § Holocene
