= Beaumontois-en-Périgord =

- Commune
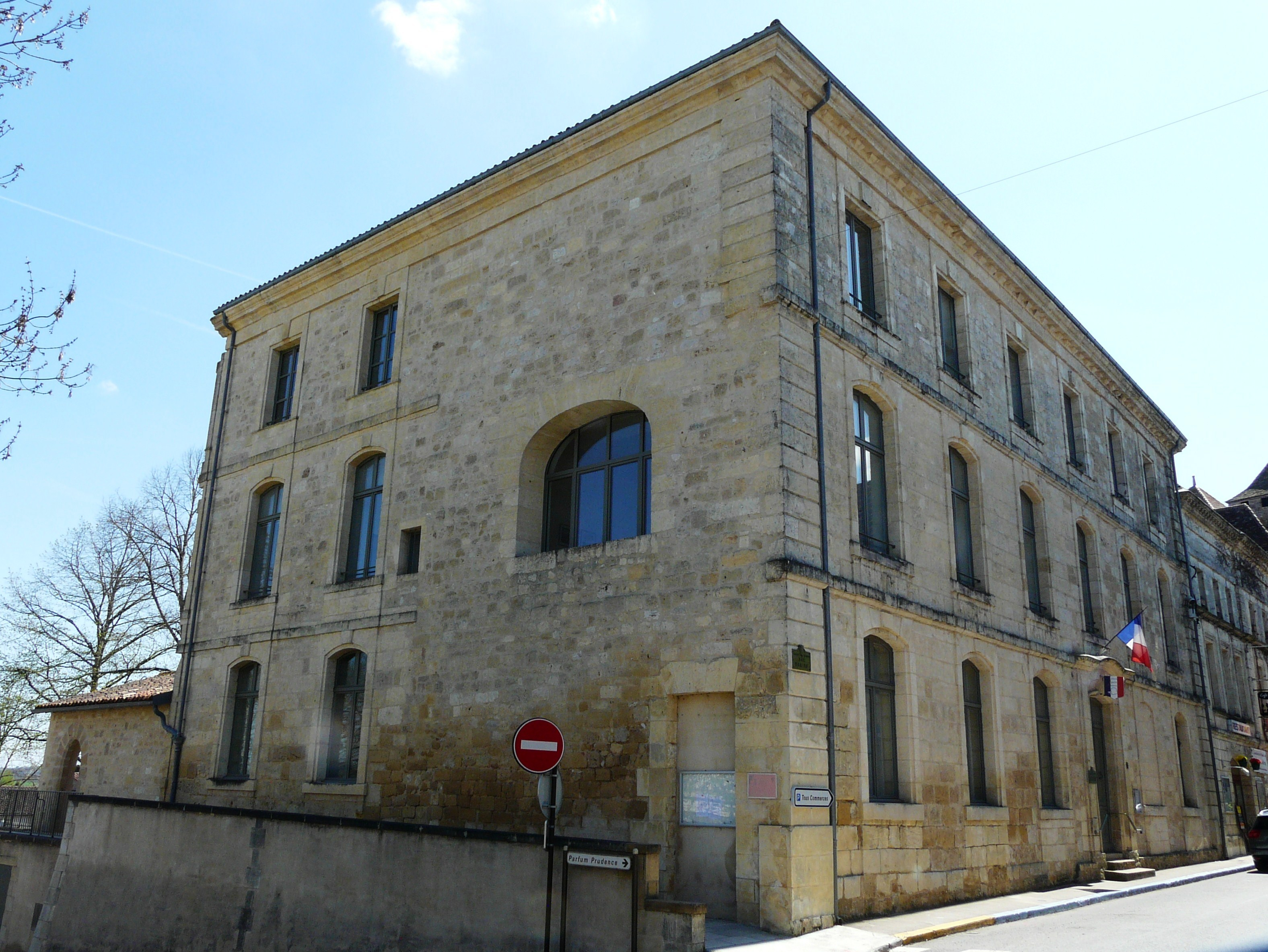
- The town hall in Beaumont-du-Périgord

- Coat of arms
- Location of Beaumontois-en-Périgord
- Location within France Location within Nouvelle-Aquitaine
- Coordinates: 44°46′08″N 0°46′05″E
- Country: France
- Region: Nouvelle-Aquitaine
- Department: Dordogne
- Arrondissement: Bergerac
- Canton: Lalinde

Government
  - Mayor (2022–2026): Jean-François Piboyeu
- Area^{1}: 72.71 km^{2} (28.07 sq mi)
- Population (2023): 1,733
  - Density: 23.83/km^{2} (61.73/sq mi)
- Time zone: UTC+01:00 (CET)
  - Summer (DST): UTC+02:00 (CEST)
- INSEE/Postal code: 24028 /24440
- ^{1} French Land Register data, which excludes lakes, ponds, glaciers > 1 km^{2} (0.386 sq mi or 247 acres) and river estuaries.

Beaumontois-en-Périgord (French pronunciation: [bomɔ̃twa ɑ̃ peʁiɡɔʁ], lit. 'Beaumontois in Périgord'; Occitan: Bèlmontés de Perigòrd) is a commune in the Dordogne department of southwestern France. The municipality was established on 1 January 2016 and consists of the former communes of Beaumont-du-Périgord, Labouquerie, Nojals-et-Clotte and Sainte-Sabine-Born.

== See also ==
- Communes of the Dordogne department
