= Montferrand-du-Périgord =

- Commune
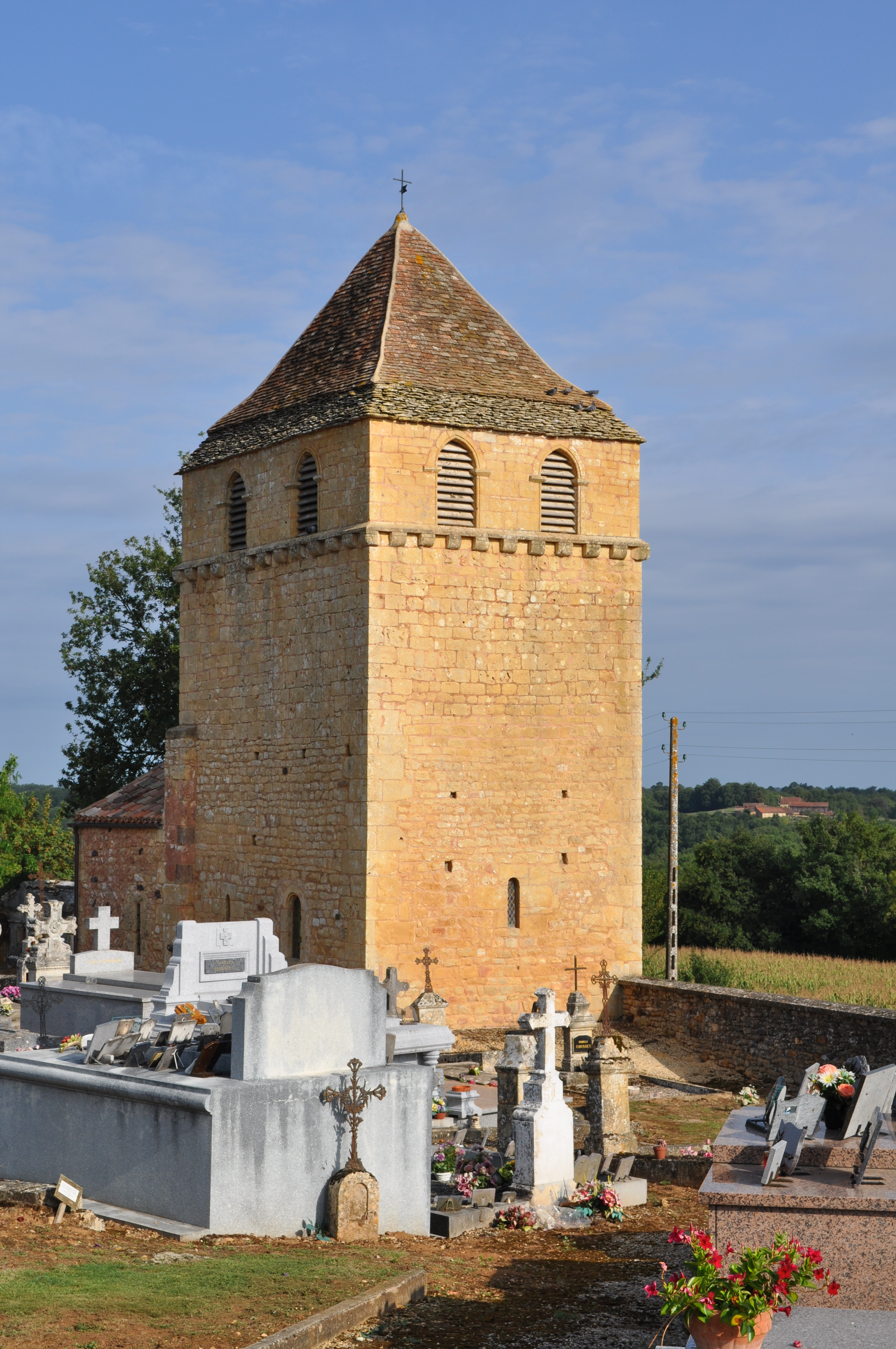
- The church in Montferrand-du-Périgord

- Coat of arms
- Location of Montferrand-du-Périgord
- Location within France Location within Nouvelle-Aquitaine
- Coordinates: 44°45′06″N 0°52′01″E
- Country: France
- Region: Nouvelle-Aquitaine
- Department: Dordogne
- Arrondissement: Bergerac
- Canton: Lalinde

Government
  - Mayor (2020–2026): Nathalie Fabre
- Area^{1}: 13.1 km^{2} (5.1 sq mi)
- Elevation: 105 m (344 ft)
- Highest elevation: 234 m (768 ft)
- Lowest elevation: 85 m (279 ft)
- Population (2023): 156
  - Density: 11.9/km^{2} (30.8/sq mi)
- Time zone: UTC+01:00 (CET)
  - Summer (DST): UTC+02:00 (CEST)
- INSEE/Postal code: 24290 /24440
- ^{1} French Land Register data, which excludes lakes, ponds, glaciers > 1 km^{2} (0.386 sq mi or 247 acres) and river estuaries.

Montferrand-du-Périgord (French pronunciation: [mɔ̃fɛʁɑ̃ dy peʁiɡɔʁ], literally Montferrand of the Périgord; Occitan: Montferrand de Perigòrd) is a commune in the Dordogne department in Nouvelle-Aquitaine in southwestern France.

== Population ==
Historical population
Year	Pop.	±% p.a.
1968	236	—
1975	211	−1.59%
1982	185	−1.86%
1990	197	+0.79%
1999	180	−1.00%
2007	171	−0.64%
2012	168	−0.35%
2017	157	−1.35%
2023	156	−0.11%
Source: INSEE

== The Church of St Christophe – 11th century ==
The Church of St Christophe is a village church and contains original wall paintings. It is located inside the cemetery on the hill south of the settlement. It is unknown why the community left this location, although according to local legend a plague outbreak may have been to blame. Up until the Revolution in 1847, when the church down in the village was completed, it was still in use as the Commune church.

The bell tower is the tallest part of the site. The nave was once almost four times longer and higher than the remaining portion, reaching as far as the extant arched memorial (located on this site to reflect the original length). The traces of the original roof on the west of the wall tower can still be seen. Yet again, there is no documentation of what transpired to the nave or why it was cut off. The indoor plaster paintings have been lost.

An external scratched drawing of a fish skeleton on the south wall is a component of the 11th century. The 12th century saw the construction of the Romanesque arch that now encloses the nave, and the 13th Century saw the addition of the circular apses to the original design. The three windows in the middle of the chancel arch are original, while further window openings were built during this period.

== Medieval wall paintings ==
The Universe is represented by the Moon and Sun, which are painted with human features and laid in a bed of stars on the ceiling in the remaining Romanesque vault of the nave. Christ is depicted perched on a throne above the Chancel, giving his blessing while being encircled by the traditional representations of the four Evangelists. A lion represents St Mark; St Matthew by a winged man; St John by an eagle; and St Luke by a bull painted in fiery red. The Annunciation—with the Angel Gabriel bending down before Mary—and St. Christopher, the patron saint of the church, carrying Jesus across a ford with his staff in full bloom—are depicted in the paintings in the left-hand bay. Triangular geometric figures underneath this image have unknown symbolism in modern times. The primary painting on the north wall is a 15th-century depiction of Hell, with Leviathan (the sea monster) consuming the damned and a woman astride a lion heading towards him (a symbol of lust). Only two of the twelve apostles are still visible in a large painting of the Last Supper that once covered the opposite (south) wall. There are numerous further, in-depth pictures, including one of St. Leonard freeing the prisoners.

== See also ==
- Communes of the Dordogne department
