= Couze-et-Saint-Front =

- Commune
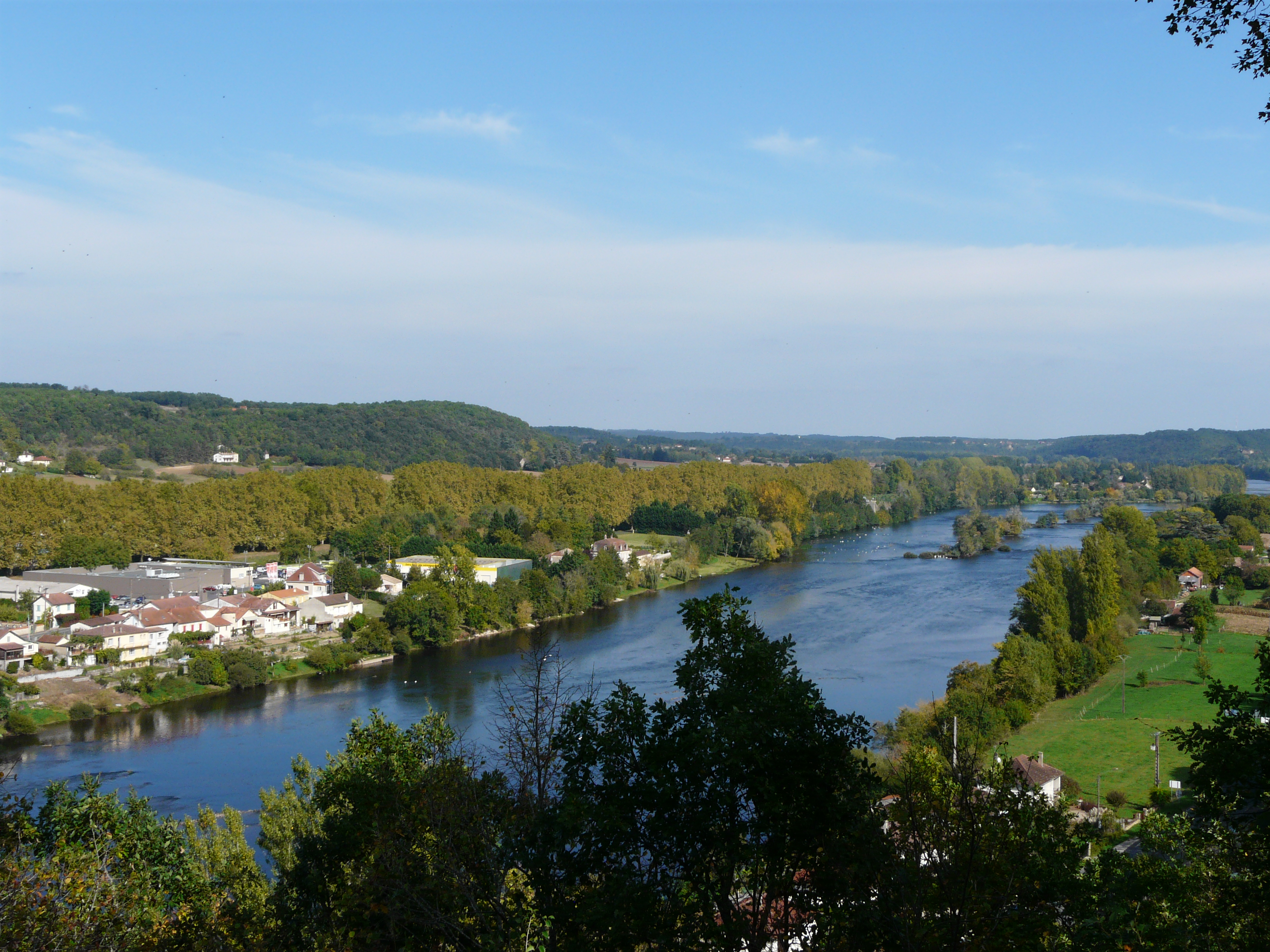
- The Dordogne river, separating Lalinde (left) and Couze-et-Saint-Front (right)
- Location of Couze-et-Saint-Front
- Location within France Location within Nouvelle-Aquitaine
- Coordinates: 44°49′41″N 0°42′25″E
- Country: France
- Region: Nouvelle-Aquitaine
- Department: Dordogne
- Arrondissement: Bergerac
- Canton: Lalinde
- Intercommunality: Bastides Dordogne-Périgord

Government
  - Mayor (2024–2026): Julie Lumen
- Area^{1}: 8.19 km^{2} (3.16 sq mi)
- Elevation: 100 m (330 ft)
- Highest elevation: 143 m (469 ft)
- Lowest elevation: 25 m (82 ft)
- Population (2023): 709
  - Density: 86.6/km^{2} (224/sq mi)
- Time zone: UTC+01:00 (CET)
  - Summer (DST): UTC+02:00 (CEST)
- INSEE/Postal code: 24143 /24150
- ^{1} French Land Register data, which excludes lakes, ponds, glaciers > 1 km^{2} (0.386 sq mi or 247 acres) and river estuaries.

Couze-et-Saint-Front (French pronunciation: [kuz e sɛ̃ fʁɔ̃]; Occitan: Cosa e Sent Front) is a commune in the Dordogne department in Nouvelle-Aquitaine in southwestern France.

== Population ==
Historical population
Year	Pop.	±% p.a.
1968	876	—
1975	921	+0.72%
1982	831	−1.46%
1990	781	−0.77%
1999	759	−0.32%
2007	775	+0.26%
2012	739	−0.95%
2017	716	−0.63%
2023	709	−0.16%
Source: INSEE

== See also ==
- Communes of the Dordogne department
