= Beaumont-du-Périgord =

- Part of Beaumontois-en-Périgord
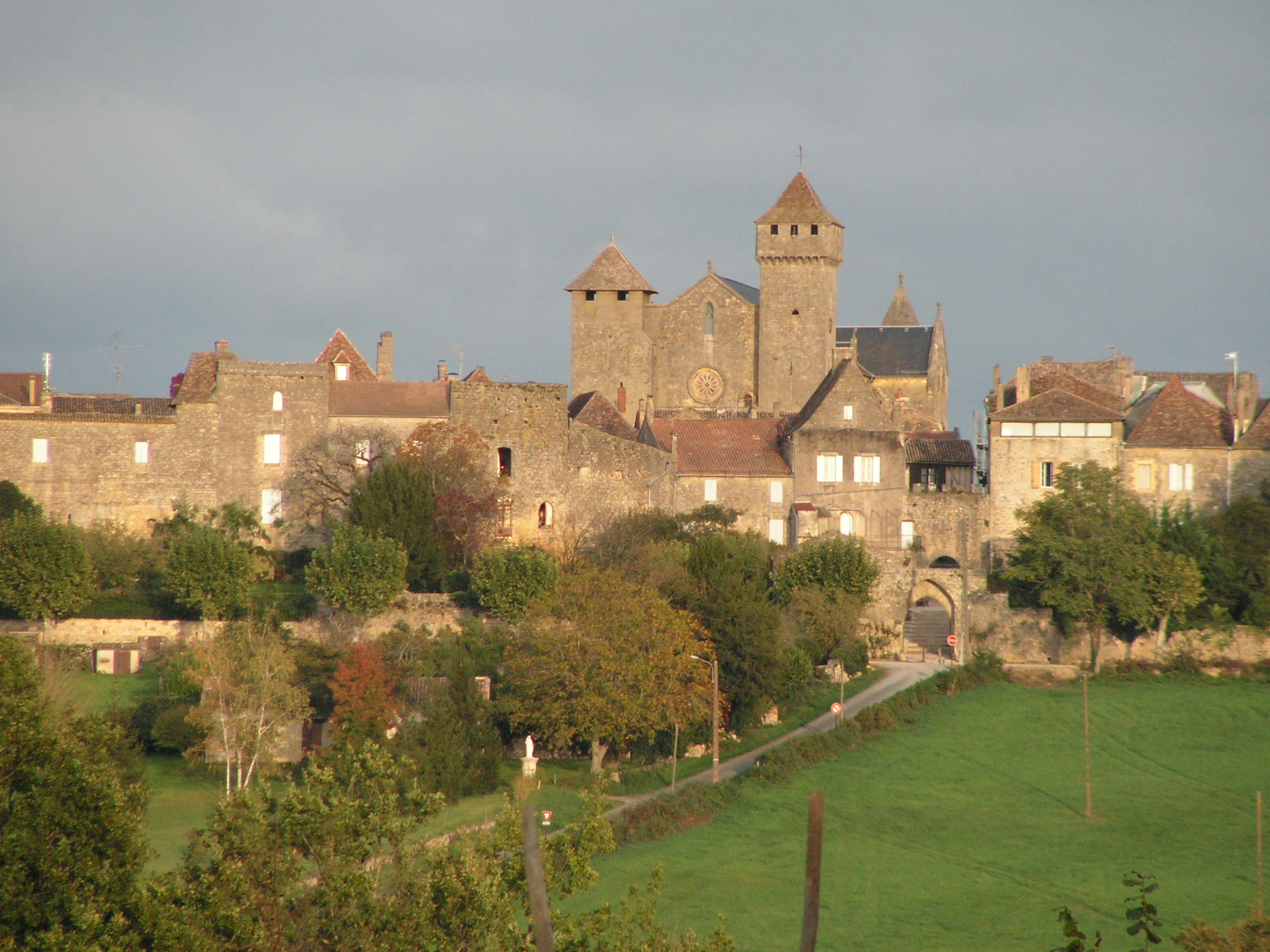

- Coat of arms
- Location of Beaumont-du-Périgord
- Location within France Location within Nouvelle-Aquitaine
- Coordinates: 44°46′15″N 0°46′05″E
- Country: France
- Region: Nouvelle-Aquitaine
- Department: Dordogne
- Arrondissement: Bergerac
- Canton: Lalinde
- Commune: Beaumontois-en-Périgord
- Area^{1}: 24.18 km^{2} (9.34 sq mi)
- Elevation: 160 m (520 ft)
- Highest elevation: 176 m (577 ft)
- Lowest elevation: 50 m (160 ft)
- Population (2022): 971
  - Density: 40.2/km^{2} (104/sq mi)
- Time zone: UTC+01:00 (CET)
  - Summer (DST): UTC+02:00 (CEST)
- Postal code: 24440
- ^{1} French Land Register data, which excludes lakes, ponds, glaciers > 1 km^{2} (0.386 sq mi or 247 acres) and river estuaries.

Beaumont-du-Périgord (French pronunciation: [bomɔ̃ dy peʁiɡɔʁ], lit. 'Beaumont of the Périgord', before 2001: Beaumont; Occitan: Bèlmont) is a former commune in the Dordogne department in Nouvelle-Aquitaine in southwestern France, on 1 January 2016, it was merged into the new commune Beaumontois-en-Périgord.

== Population ==
Historical population
Year	Pop.	±% p.a.
1962	1,019	—
1968	1,110	+1.44%
1975	1,226	+1.43%
1982	1,261	+0.40%
1990	1,155	−1.09%
1999	1,150	−0.05%
2006	1,145	−0.06%
2022	971	−1.02%
Source: EHESS and INSEE

== See also ==
- Communes of the Dordogne department
