= Saint-Angel =

Saint-Angel may refer to the following places in France:

- Saint-Angel, Allier, a commune in the department of Allier
- Saint-Angel, Corrèze, a commune in the department of Corrèze
- Saint-Angel, Puy-de-Dôme, a commune in the department of Puy-de-Dôme
- Sceau-Saint-Angel, a commune in the department of Dordogne
