= Vitrac =

Vitrac may refer to the following places in France:

- Vitrac, Cantal, a commune of the Cantal département
- Vitrac-Saint-Vincent, Charente, a commune of the Charente département
- Vitrac, Dordogne, a commune of the Dordogne département
- Vitrac, Puy-de-Dôme, a commune of the Puy-de-Dôme département

Vitrac in Art:

- Roger Vitrac, a French Surrealist playwright and poet
