= Teilhède =

- Commune
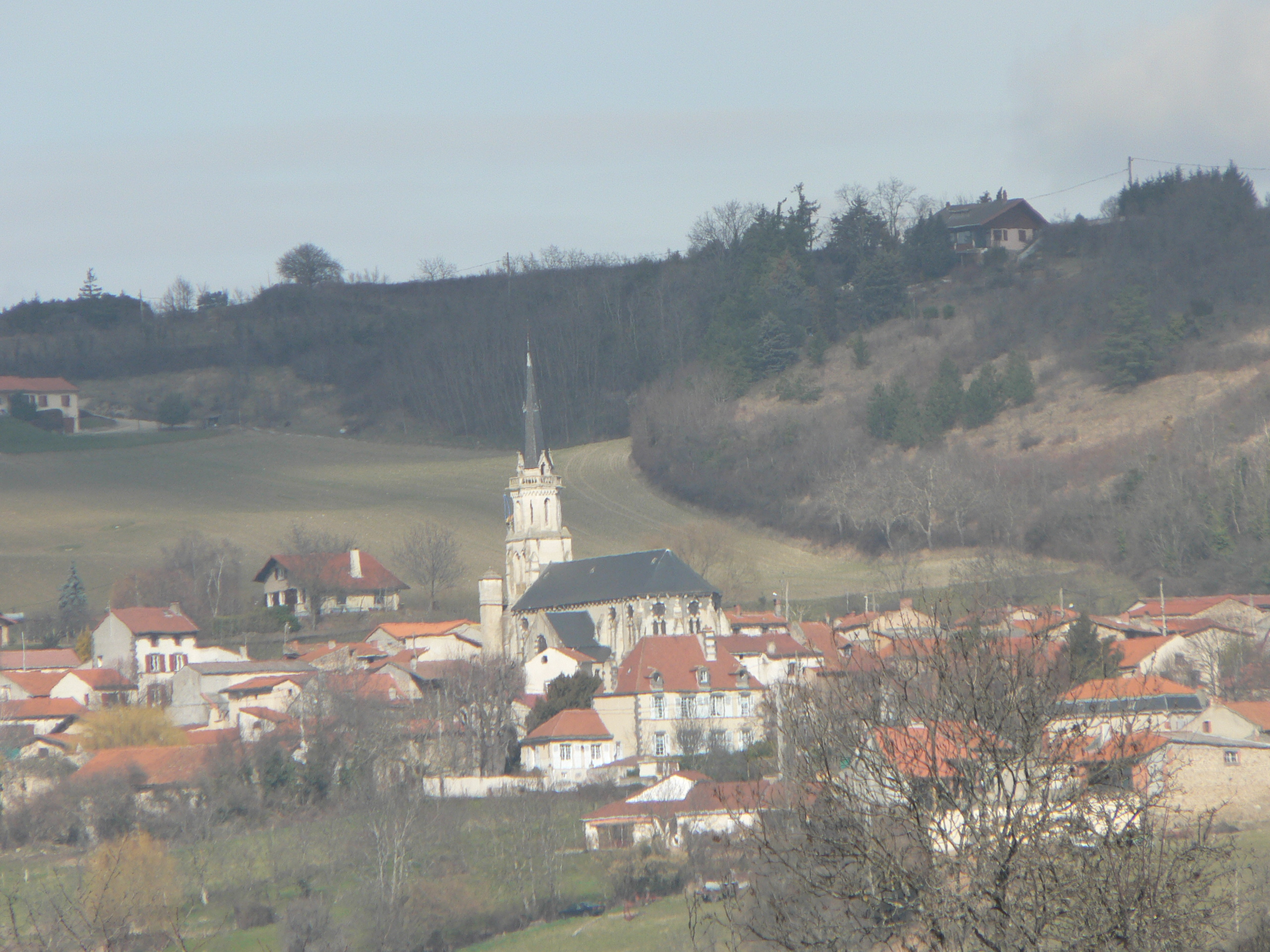
- Village of Teilhède from south-east (from RD 411 commune Prompsat)
- Location of Teilhède
- Location within France Location within Auvergne-Rhône-Alpes
- Coordinates: 45°57′24″N 3°04′21″E
- Country: France
- Region: Auvergne-Rhône-Alpes
- Department: Puy-de-Dôme
- Arrondissement: Riom
- Canton: Saint-Georges-de-Mons
- Intercommunality: CC Combrailles Sioule et Morge

Government
  - Mayor (2026–32): Pascal Charbonnel
- Area^{1}: 11.82 km^{2} (4.56 sq mi)
- Elevation: 450 m (1,480 ft)
- Highest elevation: 706 m (2,316 ft)
- Lowest elevation: 413 m (1,355 ft)
- Population (2023): 536
  - Density: 45.3/km^{2} (117/sq mi)
- Time zone: UTC+01:00 (CET)
  - Summer (DST): UTC+02:00 (CEST)
- INSEE/Postal code: 63427 /63460
- ^{1} French Land Register data, which excludes lakes, ponds, glaciers > 1 km^{2} (0.386 sq mi or 247 acres) and river estuaries.

Teilhède (French pronunciation: [tɛjɛd]; Occitan: Telheda) is a commune in the Puy-de-Dôme department in Auvergne in central France.

== See also ==
- Communes of the Puy-de-Dôme department
