= Montcel =

Montcel is the name of the following communes in France:

- Montcel, Puy-de-Dôme, in the Puy-de-Dôme department
- Montcel, Savoie, in the Savoie department
