= Villossanges =

- Commune
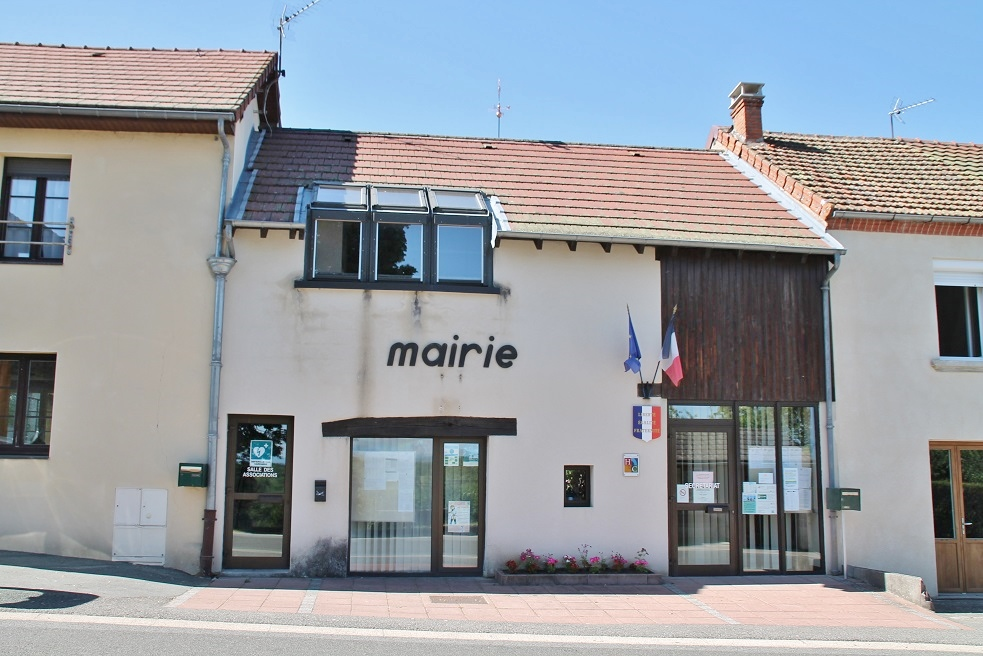
- The town hall in Villossanges

- Coat of arms
- Location of Villossanges
- Location within France Location within Auvergne-Rhône-Alpes
- Coordinates: 45°54′52″N 2°38′47″E
- Country: France
- Region: Auvergne-Rhône-Alpes
- Department: Puy-de-Dôme
- Arrondissement: Riom
- Canton: Saint-Ours
- Intercommunality: CC Chavanon Combrailles et Volcans

Government
  - Mayor (2020–2026): Jean-Luc Le Chapelain
- Area^{1}: 32.8 km^{2} (12.7 sq mi)
- Elevation: 642 m (2,106 ft)
- Highest elevation: 742 m (2,434 ft)
- Lowest elevation: 527 m (1,729 ft)
- Population (2023): 359
  - Density: 10.9/km^{2} (28.3/sq mi)
- Time zone: UTC+01:00 (CET)
  - Summer (DST): UTC+02:00 (CEST)
- INSEE/Postal code: 63460 /63380
- ^{1} French Land Register data, which excludes lakes, ponds, glaciers > 1 km^{2} (0.386 sq mi or 247 acres) and river estuaries.

Villossanges (French pronunciation: [vilɔsɑ̃ʒ], before 2020: Villosanges; Occitan: Vilosanja) is a commune in the Puy-de-Dôme department in Auvergne in central France.

== See also ==
- Communes of the Puy-de-Dôme department
