= Yssac-la-Tourette =

- Commune
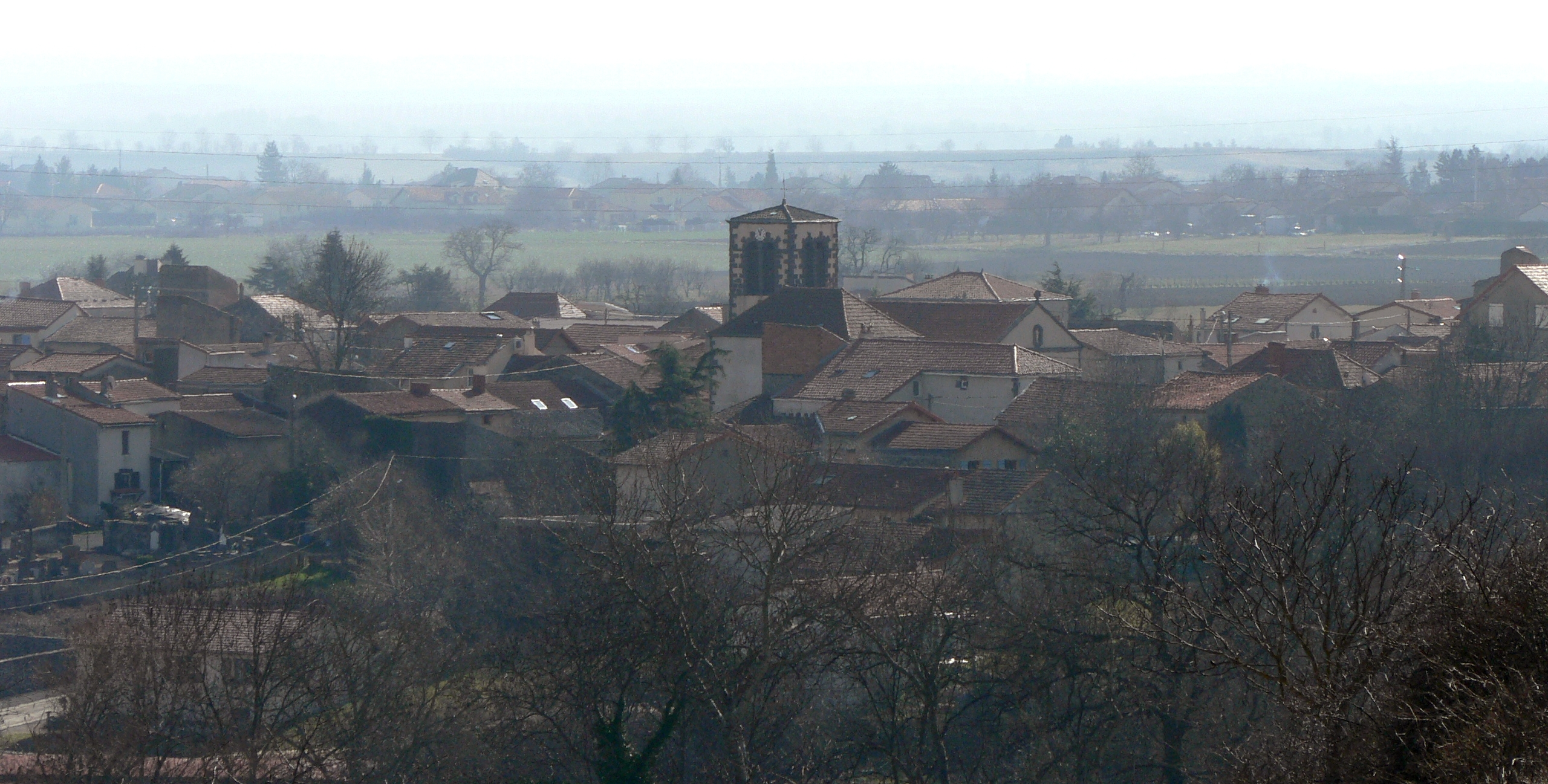
- A general view of Yssac-la-Tourette
- Location of Yssac-la-Tourette
- Location within France Location within Auvergne-Rhône-Alpes
- Coordinates: 45°56′06″N 3°05′35″E
- Country: France
- Region: Auvergne-Rhône-Alpes
- Department: Puy-de-Dôme
- Arrondissement: Riom
- Canton: Saint-Georges-de-Mons
- Intercommunality: Combrailles Sioule et Morge

Government
  - Mayor (2026–32): Alain Fradier
- Area^{1}: 2.14 km^{2} (0.83 sq mi)
- Elevation: 380 m (1,250 ft)
- Highest elevation: 443 m (1,453 ft)
- Lowest elevation: 357 m (1,171 ft)
- Population (2023): 396
  - Density: 185/km^{2} (479/sq mi)
- Time zone: UTC+01:00 (CET)
  - Summer (DST): UTC+02:00 (CEST)
- INSEE/Postal code: 63473 /63200
- ^{1} French Land Register data, which excludes lakes, ponds, glaciers > 1 km^{2} (0.386 sq mi or 247 acres) and river estuaries.

Yssac-la-Tourette (French pronunciation: [isak la tuʁɛt]; Occitan: Issac de la Toreta) is a commune in the Puy-de-Dôme department in Auvergne in central France.

== Population ==
Historical population
Year	Pop.	±% p.a.
1968	278	—
1975	263	−0.79%
1982	249	−0.78%
1990	287	+1.79%
1999	318	+1.15%
2007	351	+1.24%
2012	359	+0.45%
2017	384	+1.36%
2023	396	+0.51%
Source: INSEE

== See also ==
- Communes of the Puy-de-Dôme department
