= Communes of the Puy-de-Dôme department =

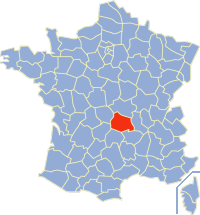
Location of Puy-de-Dôme department in France.

The following is a list of the 463 communes of the Puy-de-Dôme department of France.

== Intercommunalities ==
The communes cooperate in the following intercommunalities (as of 2025):

- Clermont Auvergne Métropole
- CA Agglo Pays d'Issoire
- Communauté d'agglomération Riom Limagne et Volcans
- Communauté de communes Ambert Livradois Forez
- CC Billom Communauté
- Communauté de communes Chavanon Combrailles et Volcans
- Communauté de communes Combrailles Sioule et Morge
- Communauté de communes Dômes Sancy Artense
- Communauté de communes Entre Dore et Allier
- Communauté de communes du Massif du Sancy (partly)
- CC Mond'Arverne Communauté
- Communauté de communes du Pays de Saint-Éloy
- Communauté de communes Plaine Limagne
- Communauté de communes Thiers Dore et Montagne

== Communes ==
List of the 464 communes:

INSEE code	Postal code	Commune
63001	63260	Aigueperse
63002	63980	Aix-la-Fayette
63003	63600	Ambert
63004	63770	Les Ancizes-Comps
63005	63340	Antoingt
63006	63420	Anzat-le-Luguet
63007	63420	Apchat
63008	63250	Arconsat
63009	63420	Ardes
63010	63220	Arlanc
63011	63700	Ars-les-Favets
63012	63460	Artonne
63013	63260	Aubiat
63014	63170	Aubière
63015	63120	Aubusson-d'Auvergne
63016	63930	Augerolles
63017	63340	Augnat
63160	63500	Aulhat-Flat
63019	63510	Aulnat
63020	63210	Aurières
63021	63114	Authezat
63022	63570	Auzat-la-Combelle
63023	63590	Auzelles
63024	63690	Avèze
63025	63390	Ayat-sur-Sioule
63026	63970	Aydat
63027	63600	Baffie
63028	63810	Bagnols
63029	63570	Bansat
63030	63310	Bas-et-Lezat
63031	63570	Beaulieu
63032	63110	Beaumont
63033	63310	Beaumont-lès-Randan
63034	63116	Beauregard-l'Évêque
63035	63460	Beauregard-Vendon
63036	63500	Bergonne
63037	63480	Bertignat
63038	63610	Besse-et-Saint-Anastaise
63039	63220	Beurières
63040	63160	Billom
63041	63640	Biollet
63042	63112	Blanzat
63043	63440	Blot-l'Église
63044	63160	Bongheat
63045	63190	Bort-l'Étang
63046	63340	Boudes
63047	63150	La Bourboule
63048	63760	Bourg-Lastic
63049	63910	Bouzel
63050	63570	Brassac-les-Mines
63051	63500	Brenat
63052	63340	Le Breuil-sur-Couze
63053	63820	Briffons
63054	63500	Le Broc
63055	63230	Bromont-Lamothe
63056	63490	Brousse
63057	63880	Le Brugeron
63058	63350	Bulhon
63059	63270	Busséol
63060	63330	Bussières
63061	63260	Bussières-et-Pruns
63062	63700	Buxières-sous-Montaigut
63063	63118	Cébazat
63065	63520	Ceilloux
63064	63620	La Celle
63066	63250	Celles-sur-Durolle
63067	63330	La Cellette
63069	63670	Le Cendre
63070	63122	Ceyrat
63071	63210	Ceyssat
63072	63250	Chabreloche
63073	63320	Chadeleuf
63074	63340	Chalus
63075	63400	Chamalières
63244	63200	Chambaron-sur-Morge
63076	63980	Chambon-sur-Dolore
63077	63790	Chambon-sur-Lac
63079	63580	Champagnat-le-Jeune
63080	63320	Champeix
63081	63600	Champétières
63082	63440	Champs
63083	63530	Chanat-la-Mouteyre
63084	63450	Chanonat
63085	63230	Chapdes-Beaufort
63086	63590	La Chapelle-Agnon
63087	63420	La Chapelle-Marcousse
63088	63580	La Chapelle-sur-Usson
63089	63720	Chappes
63090	63260	Chaptuzat
63092	63410	Charbonnières-les-Varennes
63093	63410	Charbonnières-les-Vieilles
63091	63340	Charbonnier-les-Mines
63094	63640	Charensat
63095	63290	Charnat
63096	63160	Chas
63097	63320	Chassagne
63098	63680	Chastreix
63099	63119	Châteaugay
63100	63390	Châteauneuf-les-Bains
63101	63330	Château-sur-Cher
63102	63290	Châteldon
63103	63140	Châtel-Guyon
63104	63660	La Chaulme
63105	63220	Chaumont-le-Bourg
63106	63117	Chauriat
63107	63720	Chavaroux
63108	63200	Le Cheix-sur-Morge
63110	63740	Cisternes-la-Forêt
63111	63320	Clémensat
63112	63720	Clerlande
63113	63000	Clermont-Ferrand
63114	63340	Collanges
63115	63380	Combrailles
63116	63460	Combronde
63117	63610	Compains
63118	63380	Condat-en-Combraille
63119	63490	Condat-lès-Montboissier
63120	63730	Corent
63121	63114	Coudes
63122	63320	Courgoul
63123	63450	Cournols
63124	63800	Cournon-d'Auvergne
63125	63120	Courpière
63126	63450	Le Crest
63128	63350	Crevant-Laveine
63129	63810	Cros
63130	63700	La Crouzille
63131	63350	Culhat
63132	63590	Cunlhat
63134	63340	Dauzat-sur-Vodable
63135	63200	Davayat
63109	63320	Les Deux-Rives
63136	63520	Domaize
63137	63220	Doranges
63138	63300	Dorat
63139	63220	Dore-l'Église
63140	63700	Durmignat
63141	63830	Durtol
63142	63980	Échandelys
63143	63260	Effiat
63144	63850	Égliseneuve-d'Entraigues
63145	63490	Égliseneuve-des-Liards
63146	63160	Égliseneuve-près-Billom
63147	63840	Églisolles
63148	63720	Ennezat
63149	63720	Entraigues
63150	63530	Enval
63151	63300	Escoutoux
63152	63390	Espinasse
63153	63850	Espinchal
63154	63160	Espirat
63155	63520	Estandeuil
63156	63570	Esteil
63157	63160	Fayet-le-Château
63158	63630	Fayet-Ronaye
63159	63620	Fernoël
63161	63600	La Forie
63162	63980	Fournols
63163	63740	Gelles
63164	63360	Gerzat
63165	63620	Giat
63166	63340	Gignat
63167	63200	Gimeaux
63168	63160	Glaine-Montaigut
63169	63850	La Godivelle
63170	63230	La Goutelle
63171	63390	Gouttières
63172	63320	Grandeyrolles
63173	63600	Grandrif
63174	63890	Grandval
63175	63470	Herment
63176	63210	Heume-l'Église
63177	63270	Isserteaux
63178	63500	Issoire
63179	63990	Job
63181	63460	Jozerand
63180	63350	Joze
63182	63570	Jumeaux
63183	63690	Labessette
63184	63290	Lachaux
63185	63570	Lamontgie
63186	63380	Landogne
63187	63700	Lapeyrouse
63188	63270	Laps
63189	63820	Laqueuille
63190	63690	Larodde
63191	63760	Lastic
63193	63370	Lempdes
63194	63190	Lempty
63195	63190	Lezoux
63196	63290	Limons
63197	63440	Lisseuil
63198	63410	Loubeyrat
63199	63320	Ludesse
63200	63360	Lussat
63201	63350	Luzillat
63202	63340	Madriat
63203	63200	Malauzat
63204	63510	Malintrat
63205	63270	Manglieu
63206	63410	Manzat
63207	63480	Marat
63208	63440	Marcillat
63209	63340	Mareugheol
63210	63350	Maringues
63211	63940	Marsac-en-Livradois
63212	63200	Marsat
63213	63430	Les Martres-d'Artière
63214	63730	Les Martres-de-Veyre
63215	63720	Martres-sur-Morge
63216	63160	Mauzun
63218	63220	Mayres
63219	63230	Mazaye
63220	63420	Mazoires
63221	63220	Medeyrolles
63222	63320	Meilhaud
63223	63560	Menat
63224	63200	Ménétrol
63225	63750	Messeix
63227	63730	Mirefleurs
63228	63380	Miremont
63229	63190	Moissat
63230	63890	Le Monestier
63231	63650	La Monnerie-le-Montel
63232	63310	Mons
63233	63700	Montaigut
63234	63320	Montaigut-le-Blanc
63235	63460	Montcel
63236	63240	Mont-Dore

INSEE code	Postal code	Commune
63237	63380	Montel-de-Gelat
63238	63230	Montfermy
63239	63160	Montmorin
63240	63260	Montpensier
63241	63114	Montpeyroux
63242	63340	Moriat
63243	63700	Moureuille
63245	63200	Mozac
63246	63150	Murat-le-Quaire
63247	63790	Murol
63226	63115	Mur-sur-Allier
63248	63210	Nébouzat
63249	63120	Néronde-sur-Dore
63250	63320	Neschers
63251	63560	Neuf-Église
63252	63160	Neuville
63253	63290	Noalhat
63254	63830	Nohanent
63255	63340	Nonette-Orsonnette
63256	63220	Novacelles
63257	63210	Olby
63258	63880	Olliergues
63259	63450	Olloix
63260	63880	Olmet
63261	63500	Orbeil
63262	63670	Orcet
63263	63870	Orcines
63264	63210	Orcival
63265	63190	Orléat
63267	63550	Palladuc
63268	63500	Pardines
63269	63270	Parent
63270	63500	Parentignat
63271	63290	Paslières
63272	63170	Pérignat-lès-Sarliève
63273	63800	Pérignat-sur-Allier
63274	63210	Perpezat
63275	63500	Perrier
63276	63920	Peschadoires
63277	63580	Peslières
63278	63200	Pessat-Villeneuve
63279	63113	Picherande
63280	63270	Pignols
63281	63330	Pionsat
63282	63730	Plauzat
63283	63380	Pontaumur
63284	63430	Pont-du-Château
63285	63230	Pontgibaud
63286	63440	Pouzol
63287	63500	Les Pradeaux
63288	63200	Prompsat
63289	63470	Prondines
63290	63230	Pulvérières
63291	63290	Puy-Guillaume
63292	63470	Puy-Saint-Gulmier
63293	63330	Le Quartier
63294	63780	Queuille
63295	63310	Randan
63296	63190	Ravel
63297	63160	Reignat
63298	63930	La Renaudie
63299	63420	Rentières
63300	63200	Riom
63301	63290	Ris
63302	63670	La Roche-Blanche
63303	63420	Roche-Charles-la-Mayrand
63304	63330	Roche-d'Agoux
63305	63210	Rochefort-Montagne
63306	63800	La Roche-Noire
63307	63540	Romagnat
63308	63130	Royat
63309	63840	Saillant
63311	63260	Saint-Agoulin
63312	63220	Saint-Alyre-d'Arlanc
63313	63420	Saint-Alyre-ès-Montagne
63314	63890	Saint-Amant-Roche-Savine
63315	63450	Saint-Amant-Tallende
63317	63310	Saint-André-le-Coq
63318	63410	Saint-Angel
63319	63660	Saint-Anthème
63320	63380	Saint-Avit
63321	63500	Saint-Babel
63322	63360	Saint-Beauzire
63323	63630	Saint-Bonnet-le-Bourg
63324	63630	Saint-Bonnet-le-Chastel
63325	63800	Saint-Bonnet-lès-Allier
63326	63210	Saint-Bonnet-près-Orcival
63327	63200	Saint-Bonnet-près-Riom
63332	63310	Saint-Clément-de-Régnat
63331	63660	Saint-Clément-de-Valorgue
63333	63310	Saint-Denis-Combarnazat
63334	63520	Saint-Dier-d'Auvergne
63335	63320	Saint-Diéry
63336	63680	Saint-Donat
63310	63120	Sainte-Agathe
63328	63580	Sainte-Catherine
63329	63390	Sainte-Christine
63337	63890	Saint-Éloy-la-Glacière
63338	63700	Saint-Éloy-les-Mines
63339	63380	Saint-Étienne-des-Champs
63340	63580	Saint-Étienne-sur-Usson
63341	63600	Saint-Ferréol-des-Côtes
63342	63320	Saint-Floret
63343	63520	Saint-Flour-l'Étang
63344	63440	Saint-Gal-sur-Sioule
63345	63122	Saint-Genès-Champanelle
63346	63850	Saint-Genès-Champespe
63347	63260	Saint-Genès-du-Retz
63348	63580	Saint-Genès-la-Tourette
63349	63780	Saint-Georges-de-Mons
63350	63800	Saint-Georges-sur-Allier
63352	63340	Saint-Germain-Lembron
63353	63630	Saint-Germain-l'Herm
63351	63470	Saint-Germain-près-Herment
63354	63390	Saint-Gervais-d'Auvergne
63355	63880	Saint-Gervais-sous-Meymont
63356	63340	Saint-Gervazy
63357	63340	Saint-Hérent
63360	63330	Saint-Hilaire
63358	63440	Saint-Hilaire-la-Croix
63359	63380	Saint-Hilaire-les-Monges
63362	63720	Saint-Ignat
63363	63230	Saint-Jacques-d'Ambur
63365	63520	Saint-Jean-des-Ollières
63364	63190	Saint-Jean-d'Heurs
63366	63490	Saint-Jean-en-Val
63367	63570	Saint-Jean-Saint-Gervais
63368	63160	Saint-Julien-de-Coppel
63369	63390	Saint-Julien-la-Geneste
63370	63820	Saint-Julien-Puy-Lavèze
63371	63600	Saint-Just
63372	63350	Saint-Laure
63373	63330	Saint-Maigner
63374	63600	Saint-Martin-des-Olmes
63375	63570	Saint-Martin-des-Plains
63376	63580	Saint-Martin-d'Ollières
63378	63270	Saint-Maurice
63377	63330	Saint-Maurice-près-Pionsat
63379	63460	Saint-Myon
63380	63710	Saint-Nectaire
63381	63230	Saint-Ours
63382	63440	Saint-Pardoux
63383	63610	Saint-Pierre-Colamine
63384	63480	Saint-Pierre-la-Bourlhonne
63385	63230	Saint-Pierre-le-Chastel
63386	63210	Saint-Pierre-Roche
63387	63310	Saint-Priest-Bramefant
63388	63640	Saint-Priest-des-Champs
63389	63490	Saint-Quentin-sur-Sauxillanges
63390	63440	Saint-Quintin-sur-Sioule
63391	63440	Saint-Rémy-de-Blot
63392	63500	Saint-Rémy-de-Chargnat
63393	63550	Saint-Rémy-sur-Durolle
63394	63660	Saint-Romain
63395	63450	Saint-Sandoux
63396	63450	Saint-Saturnin
63397	63950	Saint-Sauves-d'Auvergne
63398	63220	Saint-Sauveur-la-Sagne
63399	63760	Saint-Sulpice
63400	63310	Saint-Sylvestre-Pragoulin
63401	63790	Saint-Victor-la-Rivière
63402	63550	Saint-Victor-Montvianeix
63403	63320	Saint-Vincent
63404	63500	Saint-Yvoine
63405	63270	Sallèdes
63406	63260	Sardon
63407	63970	Saulzet-le-Froid
63408	63390	Sauret-Besserve
63409	63320	Saurier
63410	63470	Sauvagnat
63411	63500	Sauvagnat-Sainte-Marthe
63412	63840	Sauvessanges
63413	63730	La Sauvetat
63414	63120	Sauviat
63415	63490	Sauxillanges
63416	63750	Savennes
63417	63530	Sayat
63418	63120	Sermentizon
63419	63560	Servant
63420	63190	Seychalles
63421	63690	Singles
63422	63500	Solignat
63423	63490	Sugères
63424	63720	Surat
63425	63450	Tallende
63426	63690	Tauves
63427	63460	Teilhède
63428	63560	Teilhet
63429	63340	Ternant-les-Eaux
63430	63300	Thiers
63431	63600	Thiolières
63432	63260	Thuret
63433	63470	Tortebesse
63192	63680	La Tour-d'Auvergne
63434	63590	Tours-sur-Meymont
63435	63320	Tourzel-Ronzières
63436	63380	Tralaigues
63437	63810	Trémouille-Saint-Loup
63438	63520	Trézioux
63439	63490	Usson
63440	63610	Valbeleix
63441	63600	Valcivières
63442	63580	Valz-sous-Châteauneuf
63443	63720	Varennes-sur-Morge
63444	63500	Varennes-sur-Usson
63445	63910	Vassel
63446	63260	Vensat
63447	63330	Vergheas
63448	63580	Le Vernet-Chaméane
63449	63710	Le Vernet-Sainte-Marguerite
63450	63470	Verneugheol
63451	63210	Vernines
63452	63320	Verrières
63453	63910	Vertaizon
63454	63480	Vertolaye
63455	63960	Veyre-Monton
63456	63340	Vichel
63457	63270	Vic-le-Comte
63458	63340	Villeneuve
63459	63310	Villeneuve-les-Cerfs
63460	63380	Villossanges
63461	63350	Vinzelles
63462	63330	Virlet
63463	63250	Viscomtat
63464	63410	Vitrac
63465	63840	Viverols
63466	63500	Vodable
63467	63620	Voingt
63468	63120	Vollore-Montagne
63469	63120	Vollore-Ville
63470	63530	Volvic
63471	63700	Youx
63472	63270	Yronde-et-Buron
63473	63200	Yssac-la-Tourette

=== Former communes ===
Some communes merged into communes nouvelles in Puy-de-Dôme:

- Aulhat-Saint-Privat and Flat merged into Aulhat-Flat on 1 January 2016;
- Cellule and La Moutade merged into Chambaron-sur-Morge on 1 January 2016;
- Nonette and Orsonnette merged into Nonette-Orsonnette on 1 January 2016;
- Dallet and Mezel merged into Mur-sur-Allier on 1 January 2019;
- Creste and Saint-Diéry merged into Saint-Diéry on 1 January 2019;
- Vernet-la-Varenne and Chaméane merged into Le Vernet-Chaméane on 1 January 2019;
- Chidrac and Saint-Cirgues-sur-Couze merged into Les Deux-Rives on 1 January 2025.
