= Beauregard-Vendon =

- Commune
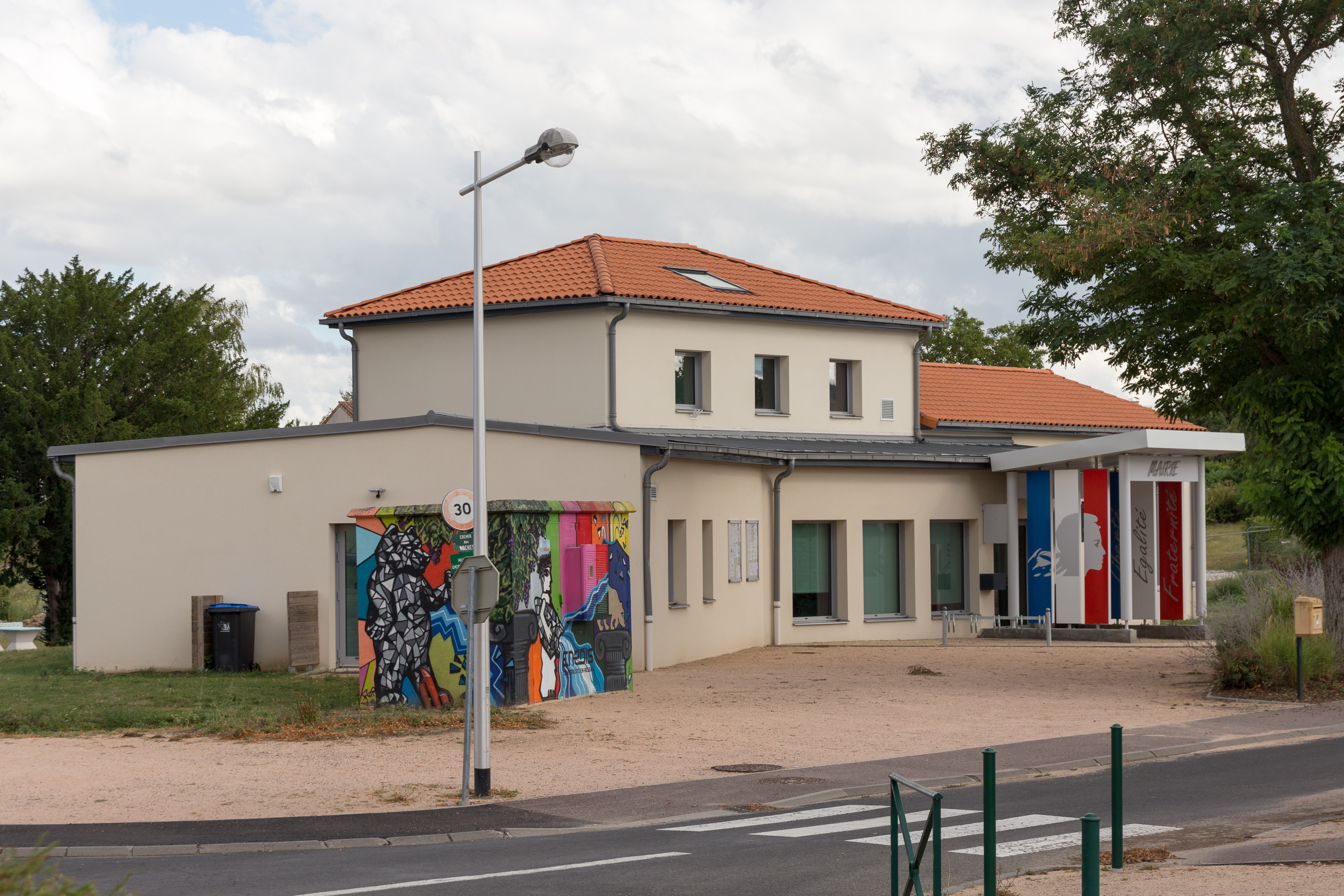
- Beauregard-Vendon Town hall

- Coat of arms
- Location of Beauregard-Vendon
- Location within France Location within Auvergne-Rhône-Alpes
- Coordinates: 45°57′37″N 3°06′40″E
- Country: France
- Region: Auvergne-Rhône-Alpes
- Department: Puy-de-Dôme
- Arrondissement: Riom
- Canton: Saint-Georges-de-Mons
- Intercommunality: Combrailles Sioule et Morge

Government
  - Mayor (2026–32): Denis Georges
- Area^{1}: 7.33 km^{2} (2.83 sq mi)
- Elevation: 362 m (1,188 ft)
- Highest elevation: 509 m (1,670 ft)
- Lowest elevation: 336 m (1,102 ft)
- Population (2023): 1,328
  - Density: 181/km^{2} (469/sq mi)
- Time zone: UTC+01:00 (CET)
  - Summer (DST): UTC+02:00 (CEST)
- INSEE/Postal code: 63035 /63460
- ^{1} French Land Register data, which excludes lakes, ponds, glaciers > 1 km^{2} (0.386 sq mi or 247 acres) and river estuaries.

Beauregard-Vendon is a commune in the Puy-de-Dôme department in Auvergne-Rhône-Alpes in central France.

== Population ==
Historical population
Year	Pop.	±% p.a.
1968	391	—
1975	456	+2.22%
1982	583	+3.57%
1990	703	+2.37%
1999	747	+0.68%
2007	950	+3.05%
2012	1,115	+3.25%
2017	1,194	+1.38%
2023	1,328	+1.79%
Source: INSEE

== See also ==
- Communes of the Puy-de-Dôme department
