= Saint-Georges-de-Mons =

- Commune
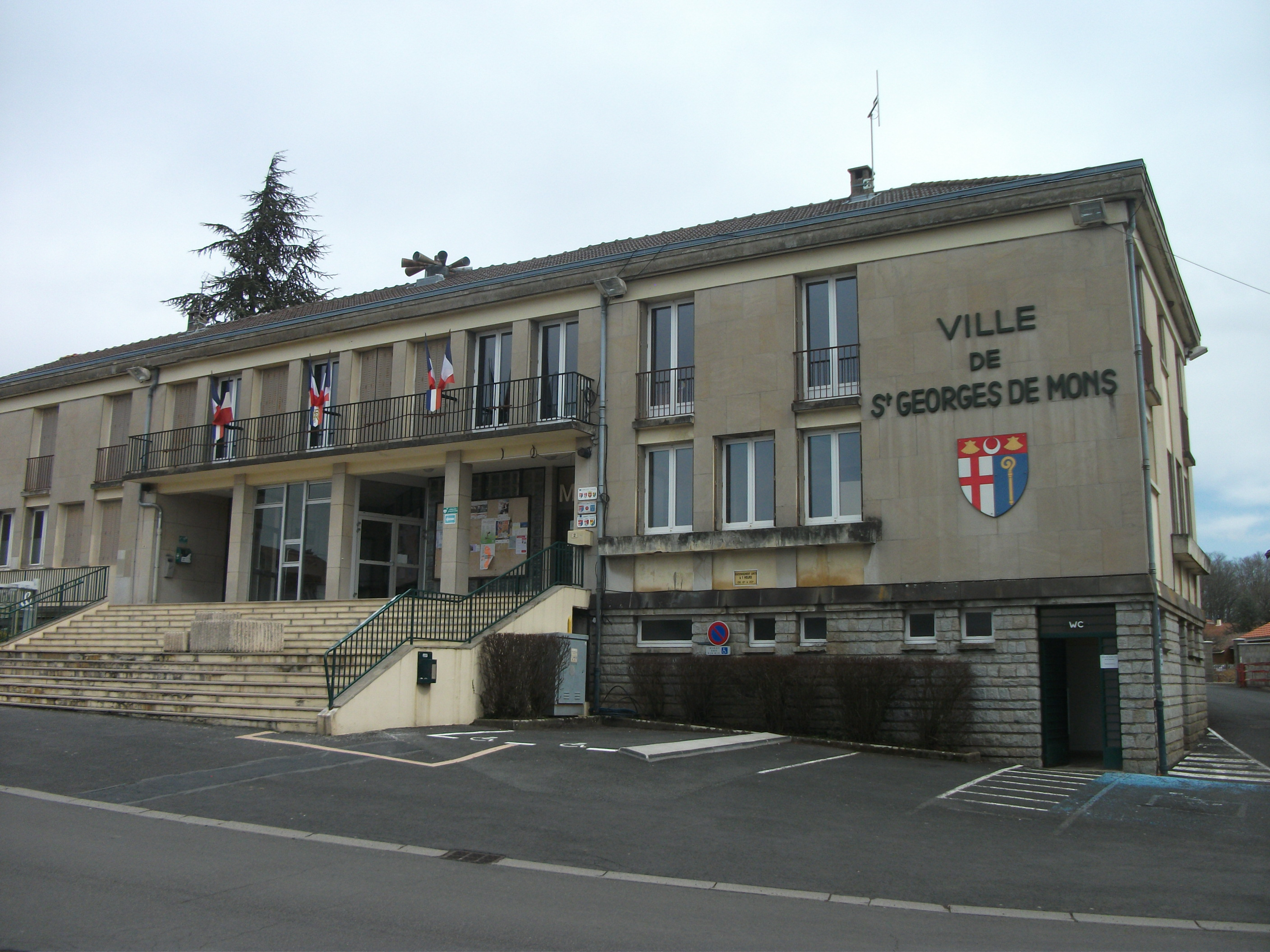
- Town hall

- Coat of arms
- Location of Saint-Georges-de-Mons
- Location within France Location within Auvergne-Rhône-Alpes
- Coordinates: 45°56′24″N 2°50′20″E
- Country: France
- Region: Auvergne-Rhône-Alpes
- Department: Puy-de-Dôme
- Arrondissement: Riom
- Canton: Saint-Georges-de-Mons
- Intercommunality: Combrailles Sioule et Morge

Government
  - Mayor (2020–2026): Julien Perrin
- Area^{1}: 34.15 km^{2} (13.19 sq mi)
- Elevation: 735 m (2,411 ft)
- Highest elevation: 869 m (2,851 ft)
- Lowest elevation: 440 m (1,440 ft)
- Population (2023): 2,048
  - Density: 59.97/km^{2} (155.3/sq mi)
- Time zone: UTC+01:00 (CET)
  - Summer (DST): UTC+02:00 (CEST)
- INSEE/Postal code: 63349 /63780
- Website: ville-st-georges-de-mons.fr
- ^{1} French Land Register data, which excludes lakes, ponds, glaciers > 1 km^{2} (0.386 sq mi or 247 acres) and river estuaries.

Saint-Georges-de-Mons (French pronunciation: [sɛ̃ ʒɔʁʒ də mɔ̃s]; Occitan: Sent Jòrgi de Mons) is a commune in the Puy-de-Dôme department in Auvergne-Rhône-Alpes in central France.

== Population ==
Historical population
Year	Pop.	±% p.a.
1968	2,476	—
1975	2,567	+0.52%
1982	2,689	+0.67%
1990	2,451	−1.15%
1999	2,260	−0.90%
2007	2,187	−0.41%
2012	2,050	−1.29%
2017	1,955	−0.94%
2023	2,048	+0.78%
Source: INSEE

== See also ==
- Communes of the Puy-de-Dôme department
