= Marcillat =

- Commune
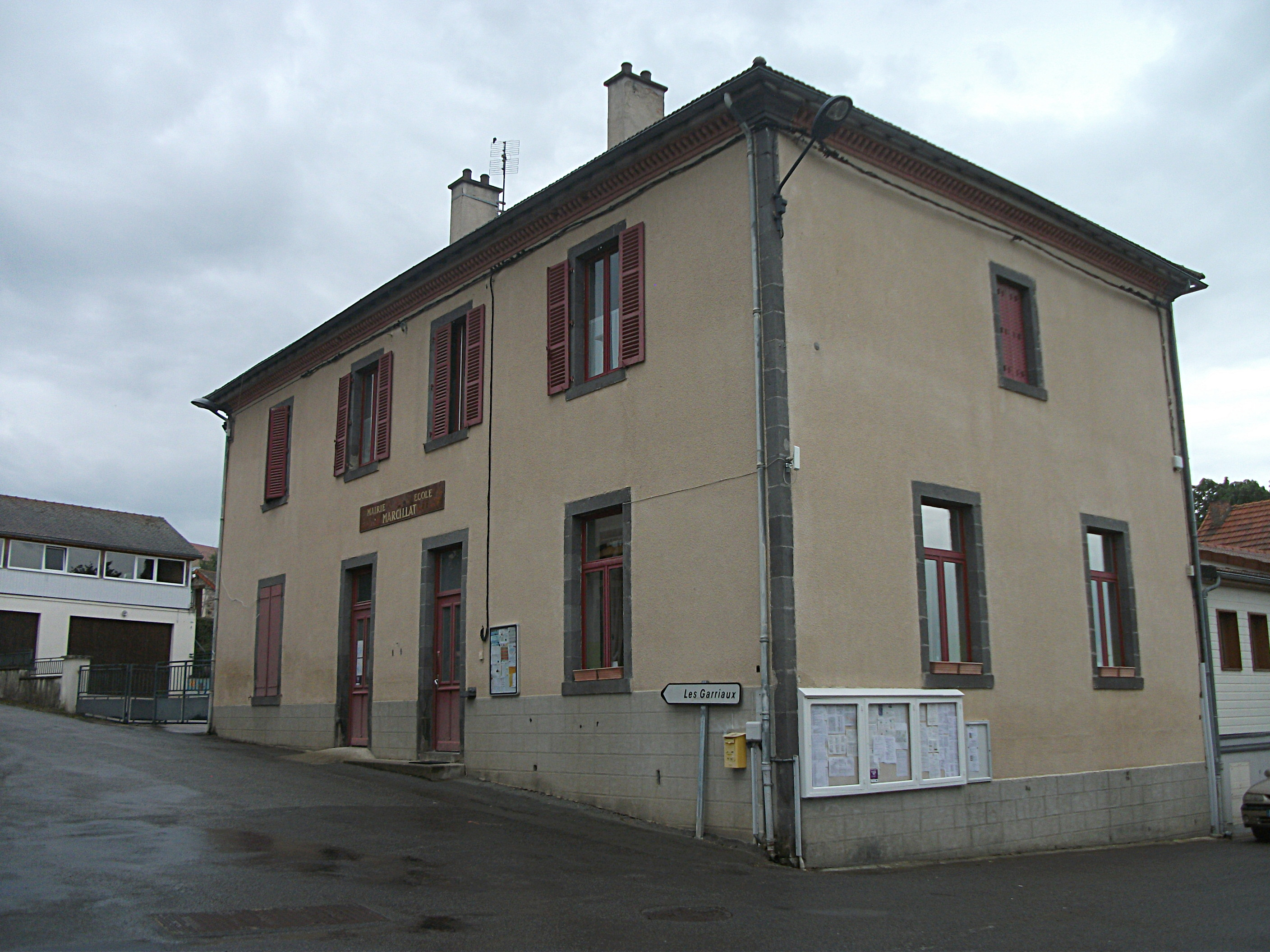
- The town hall in Marcillat
- Location of Marcillat
- Location within France Location within Auvergne-Rhône-Alpes
- Coordinates: 46°04′50″N 3°02′16″E
- Country: France
- Region: Auvergne-Rhône-Alpes
- Department: Puy-de-Dôme
- Arrondissement: Riom
- Canton: Saint-Georges-de-Mons
- Intercommunality: CC Combrailles Sioule et Morge

Government
  - Mayor (2020–2026): Bernard Lescure
- Area^{1}: 11.76 km^{2} (4.54 sq mi)
- Elevation: 450 m (1,480 ft)
- Highest elevation: 650 m (2,130 ft)
- Lowest elevation: 340 m (1,120 ft)
- Population (2023): 340
  - Density: 29/km^{2} (75/sq mi)
- Time zone: UTC+01:00 (CET)
  - Summer (DST): UTC+02:00 (CEST)
- INSEE/Postal code: 63208 /63440
- ^{1} French Land Register data, which excludes lakes, ponds, glaciers > 1 km^{2} (0.386 sq mi or 247 acres) and river estuaries.

Marcillat (French pronunciation: [maʁsija]; Occitan: Marcilhac) is a commune in the Puy-de-Dôme department in Auvergne-Rhône-Alpes in central France.

== See also ==
- Communes of the Puy-de-Dôme department
