= Gimeaux =

- Commune
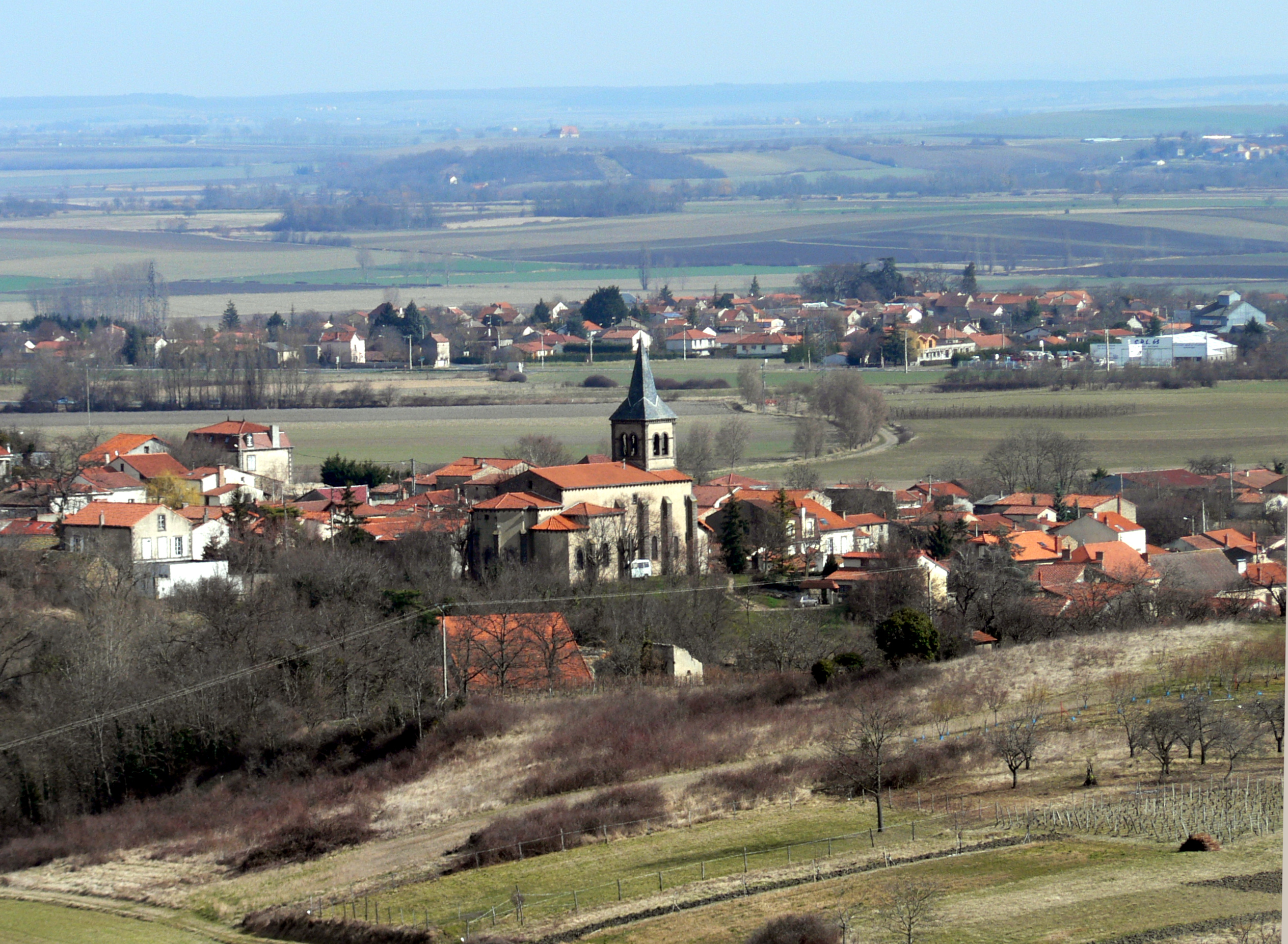
- Village of Gimeaux seen from the south-west (DR 411 Prompsat)
- Location of Gimeaux
- Location within France Location within Auvergne-Rhône-Alpes
- Coordinates: 45°57′03″N 3°05′40″E
- Country: France
- Region: Auvergne-Rhône-Alpes
- Department: Puy-de-Dôme
- Arrondissement: Riom
- Canton: Saint-Georges-de-Mons

Government
  - Mayor (2026–32): Sébastien Guillot
- Area^{1}: 2.19 km^{2} (0.85 sq mi)
- Elevation: 400 m (1,300 ft)
- Highest elevation: 428 m (1,404 ft)
- Lowest elevation: 354 m (1,161 ft)
- Population (2023): 383
  - Density: 175/km^{2} (453/sq mi)
- Time zone: UTC+01:00 (CET)
  - Summer (DST): UTC+02:00 (CEST)
- INSEE/Postal code: 63167 /63200
- ^{1} French Land Register data, which excludes lakes, ponds, glaciers > 1 km^{2} (0.386 sq mi or 247 acres) and river estuaries.

Gimeaux (French pronunciation: [ʒimo]; Occitan: Gimaus) is a commune in the Puy-de-Dôme department in Auvergne in central France.

== See also ==
- Communes of the Puy-de-Dôme department
