= Puy-Saint-Gulmier =

- Commune
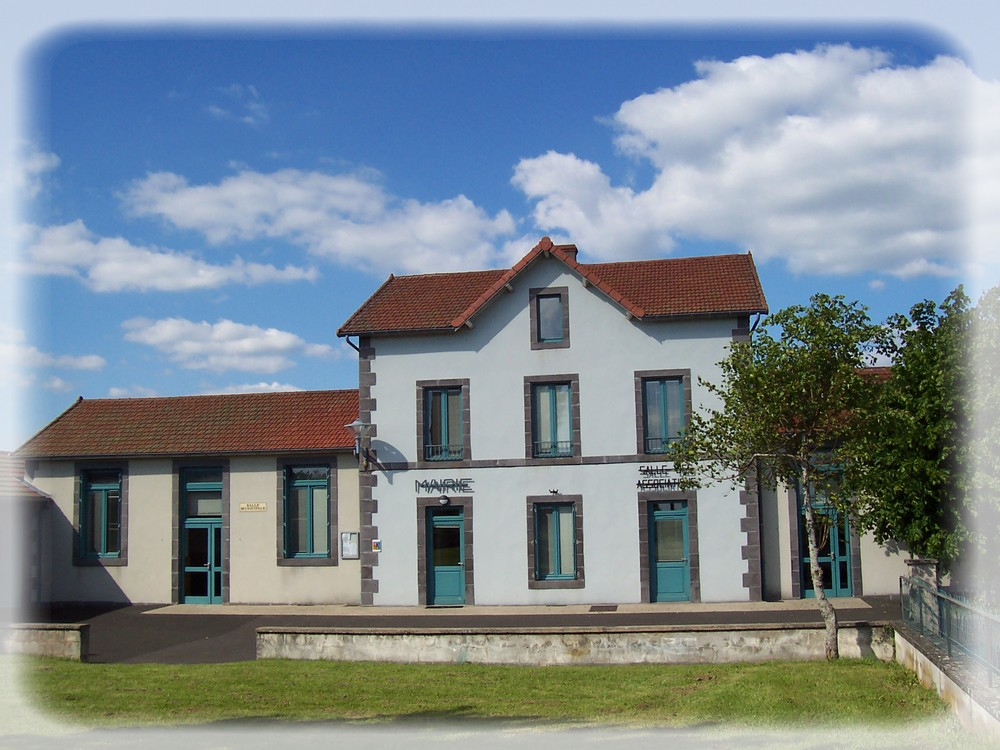
- The town hall in Puy-Saint-Gulmier
- Location of Puy-Saint-Gulmier
- Location within France Location within Auvergne-Rhône-Alpes
- Coordinates: 45°47′28″N 2°37′41″E
- Country: France
- Region: Auvergne-Rhône-Alpes
- Department: Puy-de-Dôme
- Arrondissement: Riom
- Canton: Saint-Ours

Government
  - Mayor (2026–32): Cédric Rougheol
- Area^{1}: 20.19 km^{2} (7.80 sq mi)
- Elevation: 818 m (2,684 ft)
- Highest elevation: 853 m (2,799 ft)
- Lowest elevation: 616 m (2,021 ft)
- Population (2023): 135
  - Density: 6.69/km^{2} (17.3/sq mi)
- Time zone: UTC+01:00 (CET)
  - Summer (DST): UTC+02:00 (CEST)
- INSEE/Postal code: 63292 /63470
- ^{1} French Land Register data, which excludes lakes, ponds, glaciers > 1 km^{2} (0.386 sq mi or 247 acres) and river estuaries.

Puy-Saint-Gulmier (French pronunciation: [pɥi sɛ̃ ɡylmje]) is a commune in the Puy-de-Dôme department in Auvergne in central France.

== See also ==
- Communes of the Puy-de-Dôme department
