= Saint-Hilaire-la-Croix =

- Commune
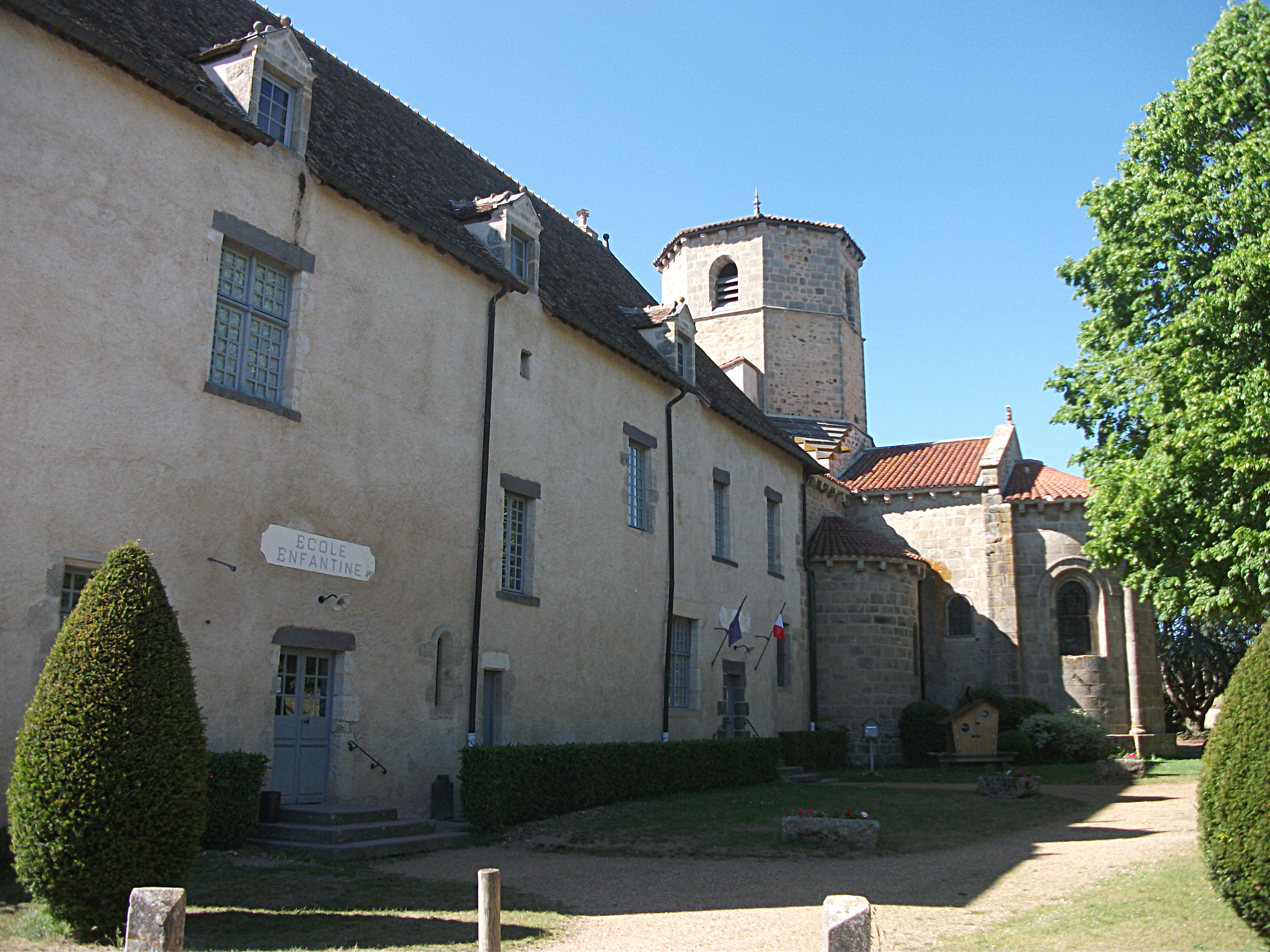
- School, town hall and church.
- Location of Saint-Hilaire-la-Croix
- Location within France Location within Auvergne-Rhône-Alpes
- Coordinates: 46°02′49″N 3°02′46″E
- Country: France
- Region: Auvergne-Rhône-Alpes
- Department: Puy-de-Dôme
- Arrondissement: Riom
- Canton: Saint-Georges-de-Mons
- Intercommunality: Combrailles Sioule et Morge

Government
  - Mayor (2020–2026): Sylvain Lelièvre
- Area^{1}: 16.21 km^{2} (6.26 sq mi)
- Elevation: 557 m (1,827 ft)
- Highest elevation: 661 m (2,169 ft)
- Lowest elevation: 414 m (1,358 ft)
- Population (2023): 374
  - Density: 23.1/km^{2} (59.8/sq mi)
- Time zone: UTC+01:00 (CET)
  - Summer (DST): UTC+02:00 (CEST)
- INSEE/Postal code: 63358 /63440
- ^{1} French Land Register data, which excludes lakes, ponds, glaciers > 1 km^{2} (0.386 sq mi or 247 acres) and river estuaries.

Saint-Hilaire-la-Croix (French pronunciation: [sɛ̃t‿ilɛʁ la kʁwa]; Occitan: Sent Alari de la Crotz) is a commune in the Puy-de-Dôme department in Auvergne-Rhône-Alpes in central France.

== See also ==
- Communes of the Puy-de-Dôme department
