= Jozerand =

- Commune
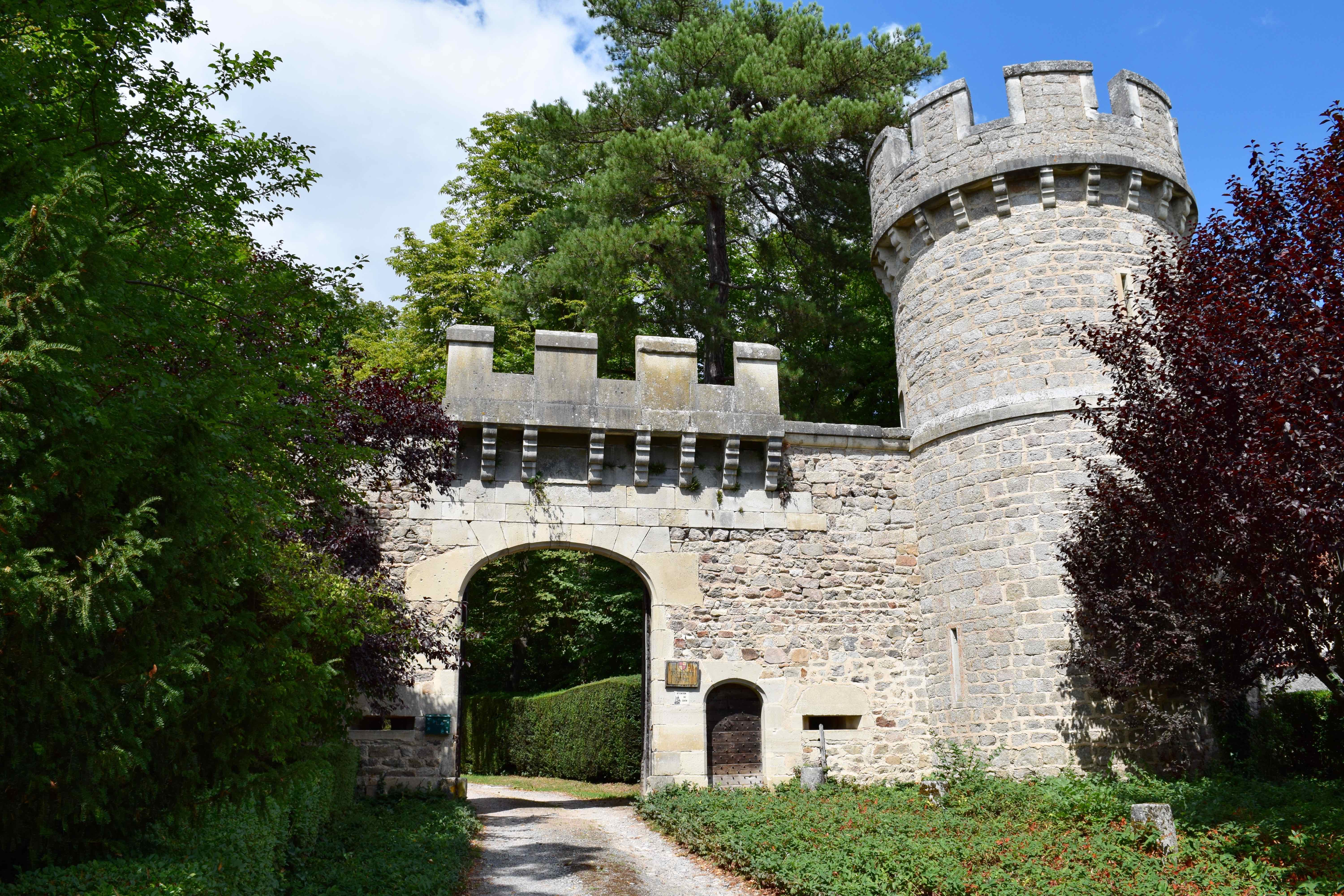
- The chateau in Jozerand

- Coat of arms
- Location of Jozerand
- Location within France Location within Auvergne-Rhône-Alpes
- Coordinates: 46°01′35″N 3°05′52″E
- Country: France
- Region: Auvergne-Rhône-Alpes
- Department: Puy-de-Dôme
- Arrondissement: Riom
- Canton: Saint-Georges-de-Mons
- Intercommunality: CC Combrailles Sioule et Morge

Government
  - Mayor (2020–2026): André Languille
- Area^{1}: 10.76 km^{2} (4.15 sq mi)
- Highest elevation: 549 m (1,801 ft)
- Lowest elevation: 357 m (1,171 ft)
- Population (2023): 553
  - Density: 51.4/km^{2} (133/sq mi)
- Time zone: UTC+01:00 (CET)
  - Summer (DST): UTC+02:00 (CEST)
- INSEE/Postal code: 63181 /63460
- ^{1} French Land Register data, which excludes lakes, ponds, glaciers > 1 km^{2} (0.386 sq mi or 247 acres) and river estuaries.

Jozerand (French pronunciation: [ʒozʁɑ̃]; before June 2009: Joserand; Occitan: Jausarens) is a commune in the Puy-de-Dôme department in Auvergne in central France.

== See also ==
- Communes of the Puy-de-Dôme department
