= Charbonnières-les-Vieilles =

- Commune
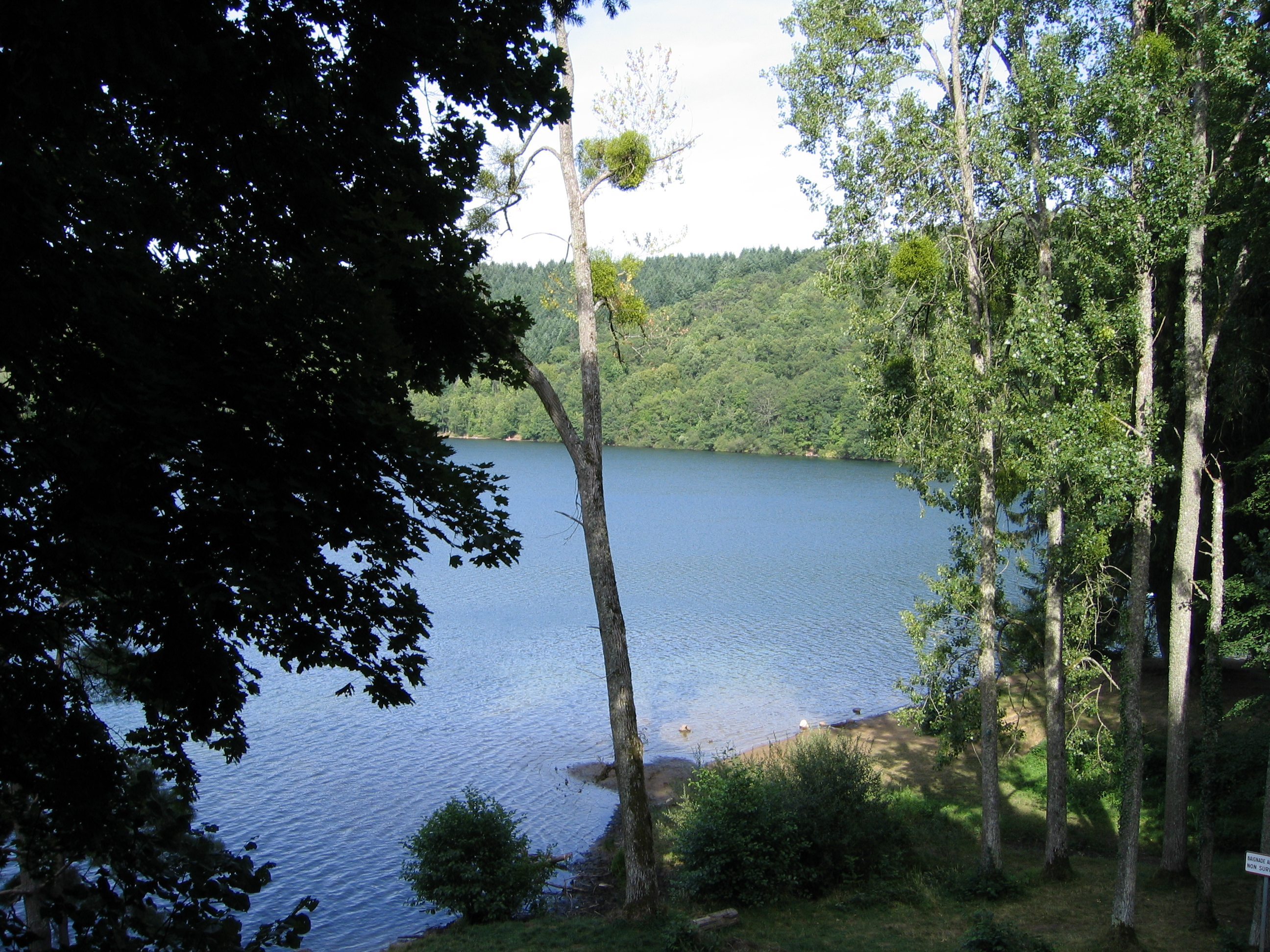
- The Gour of Tazenat

- Coat of arms
- Location of Charbonnières-les-Vieilles
- Location within France Location within Auvergne-Rhône-Alpes
- Coordinates: 45°59′44″N 2°59′57″E
- Country: France
- Region: Auvergne-Rhône-Alpes
- Department: Puy-de-Dôme
- Arrondissement: Riom
- Canton: Saint-Georges-de-Mons
- Intercommunality: CC Combrailles Sioule et Morge

Government
  - Mayor (2026–32): Michaël Baré
- Area^{1}: 32.62 km^{2} (12.59 sq mi)
- Elevation: 618 m (2,028 ft)
- Highest elevation: 755 m (2,477 ft)
- Lowest elevation: 472 m (1,549 ft)
- Population (2023): 1,170
  - Density: 35.9/km^{2} (92.9/sq mi)
- Time zone: UTC+01:00 (CET)
  - Summer (DST): UTC+02:00 (CEST)
- INSEE/Postal code: 63093 /63410
- ^{1} French Land Register data, which excludes lakes, ponds, glaciers > 1 km^{2} (0.386 sq mi or 247 acres) and river estuaries.

Charbonnières-les-Vieilles (French pronunciation: [ʃaʁbɔnjɛʁ les vjɛj]) is a commune in the Puy-de-Dôme department in Auvergne-Rhône-Alpes in central France.

== See also ==
- Communes of the Puy-de-Dôme department
