= Tralaigues =

- Commune
- Location of Tralaigues
- Location within France Location within Auvergne-Rhône-Alpes
- Coordinates: 45°54′05″N 2°35′39″E
- Country: France
- Region: Auvergne-Rhône-Alpes
- Department: Puy-de-Dôme
- Arrondissement: Riom
- Canton: Saint-Ours
- Intercommunality: CC Chavanon Combrailles et Volcans

Government
  - Mayor (2026–32): Gilles Besançon
- Area^{1}: 5.11 km^{2} (1.97 sq mi)
- Elevation: 666 m (2,185 ft)
- Highest elevation: 717 m (2,352 ft)
- Lowest elevation: 635 m (2,083 ft)
- Population (2023): 80
  - Density: 16/km^{2} (41/sq mi)
- Time zone: UTC+01:00 (CET)
  - Summer (DST): UTC+02:00 (CEST)
- INSEE/Postal code: 63436 /63380
- ^{1} French Land Register data, which excludes lakes, ponds, glaciers > 1 km^{2} (0.386 sq mi or 247 acres) and river estuaries.

Tralaigues (French pronunciation: [tʁalɛɡ]; Occitan: Traslaiga) is a commune in the Puy-de-Dôme department in Auvergne in central France.

== See also ==
- Communes of the Puy-de-Dôme department
