= Loubeyrat =

- Commune
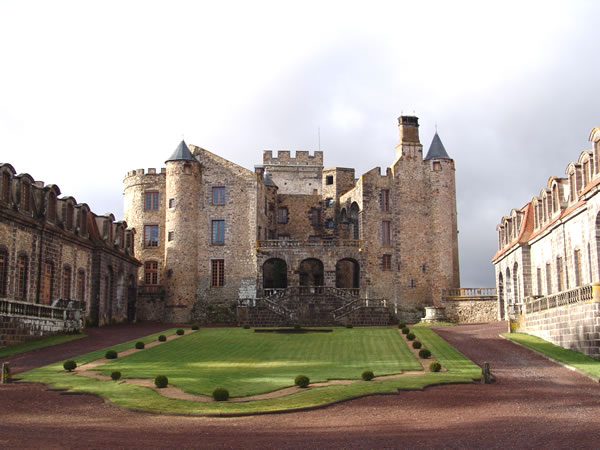
- The chateau of Chazeron in Loubeyrat
- Location of Loubeyrat
- Location within France Location within Auvergne-Rhône-Alpes
- Coordinates: 45°56′12″N 3°00′41″E
- Country: France
- Region: Auvergne-Rhône-Alpes
- Department: Puy-de-Dôme
- Arrondissement: Riom
- Canton: Saint-Georges-de-Mons
- Intercommunality: Combrailles Sioule et Morge

Government
  - Mayor (2020–2026): Sébastien Blanc
- Area^{1}: 23.93 km^{2} (9.24 sq mi)
- Elevation: 665 m (2,182 ft)
- Highest elevation: 869 m (2,851 ft)
- Lowest elevation: 440 m (1,440 ft)
- Population (2023): 1,437
  - Density: 60.05/km^{2} (155.5/sq mi)
- Time zone: UTC+01:00 (CET)
  - Summer (DST): UTC+02:00 (CEST)
- INSEE/Postal code: 63198 /63410
- ^{1} French Land Register data, which excludes lakes, ponds, glaciers > 1 km^{2} (0.386 sq mi or 247 acres) and river estuaries.

Loubeyrat (French pronunciation: [lubeʁa]; Occitan: Lobeirac) is a commune in the Puy-de-Dôme department in Auvergne-Rhône-Alpes in central France.

== See also ==
- Communes of the Puy-de-Dôme department
