= Saint-Myon =

- Commune
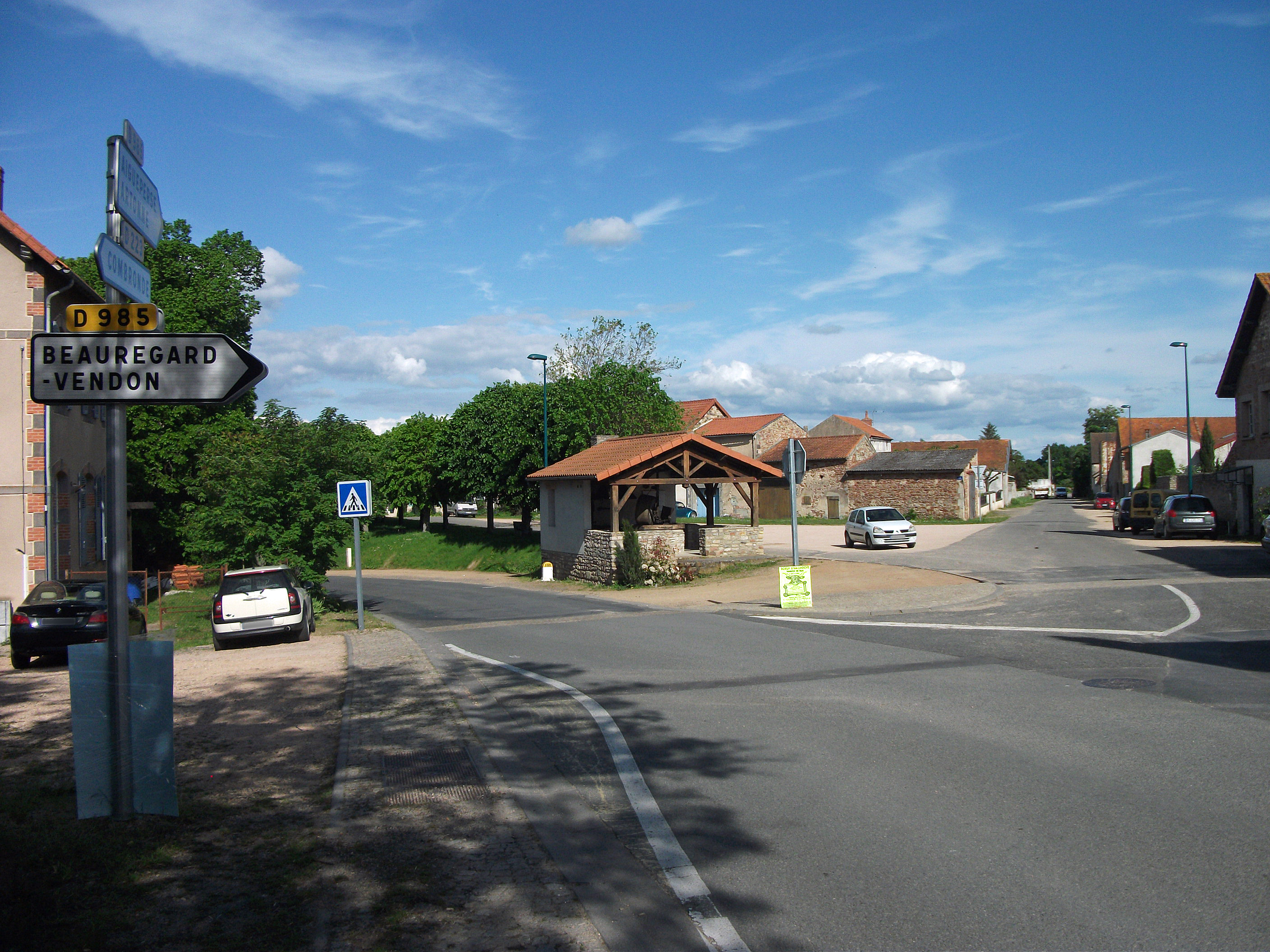
- A view within Saint-Myon

- Coat of arms
- Location of Saint-Myon
- Location within France Location within Auvergne-Rhône-Alpes
- Coordinates: 45°59′38″N 3°07′52″E
- Country: France
- Region: Auvergne-Rhône-Alpes
- Department: Puy-de-Dôme
- Arrondissement: Riom
- Canton: Saint-Georges-de-Mons
- Intercommunality: Combrailles Sioule et Morge

Government
  - Mayor (2026–32): Jean-Pierre Muselier
- Area^{1}: 5.51 km^{2} (2.13 sq mi)
- Elevation: 353 m (1,158 ft)
- Highest elevation: 451 m (1,480 ft)
- Lowest elevation: 334 m (1,096 ft)
- Population (2023): 544
  - Density: 98.7/km^{2} (256/sq mi)
- Time zone: UTC+01:00 (CET)
  - Summer (DST): UTC+02:00 (CEST)
- INSEE/Postal code: 63379 /63460
- ^{1} French Land Register data, which excludes lakes, ponds, glaciers > 1 km^{2} (0.386 sq mi or 247 acres) and river estuaries.

Saint-Myon (French pronunciation: [sɛ̃ mjɔ̃]; Occitan: Sent Mion) is a commune in the Puy-de-Dôme department in Auvergne in central France.

== History ==
Saint-Myon has a bridge, which was destroyed during World War II to prevent German troops from passing.

== See also ==
- Communes of the Puy-de-Dôme department
