= Pouzol =

- Commune
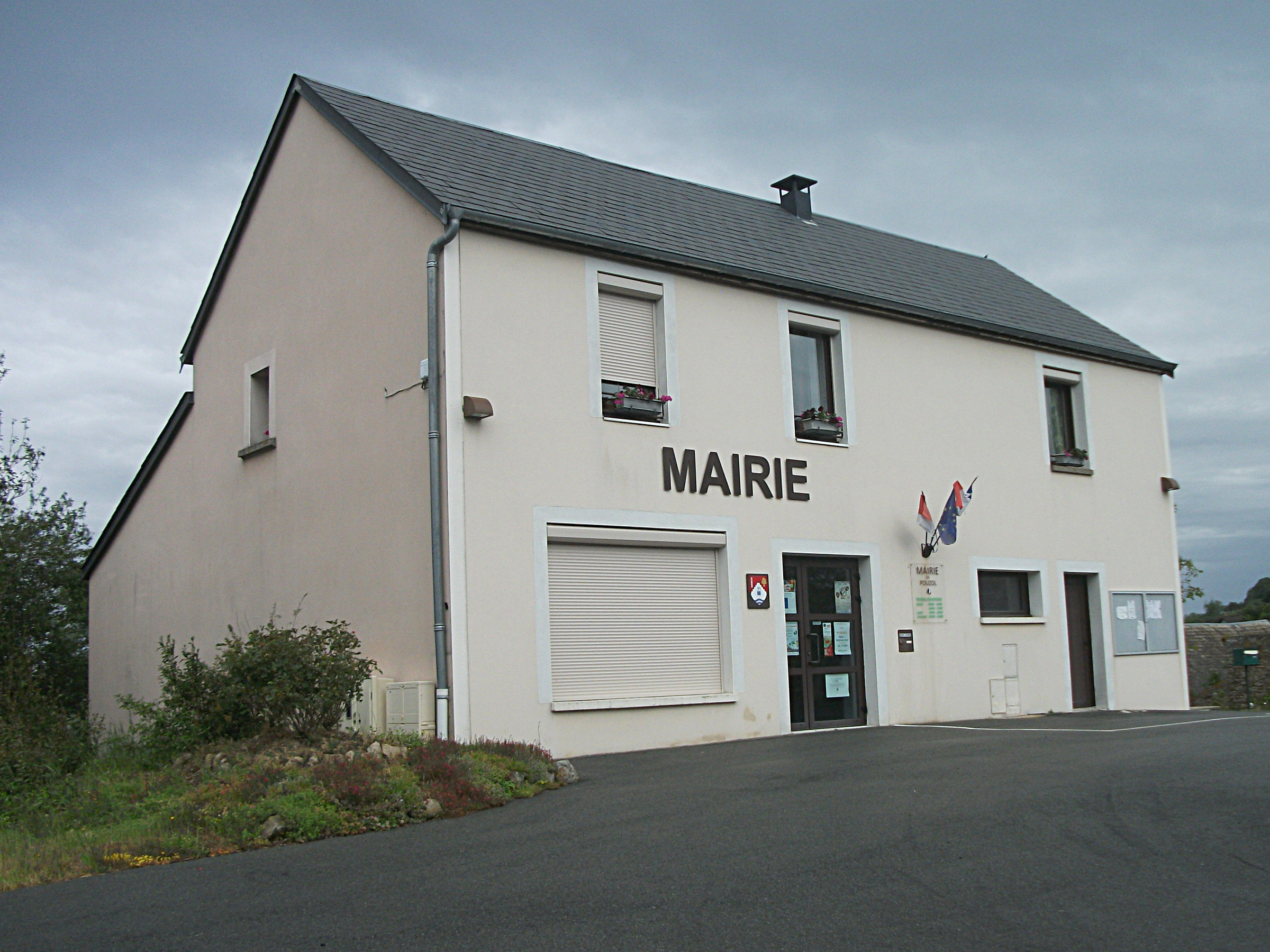
- Town hall

- Coat of arms
- Location of Pouzol
- Location within France Location within Auvergne-Rhône-Alpes
- Coordinates: 46°05′28″N 2°58′12″E
- Country: France
- Region: Auvergne-Rhône-Alpes
- Department: Puy-de-Dôme
- Arrondissement: Riom
- Canton: Saint-Georges-de-Mons
- Intercommunality: Combrailles Sioule et Morge

Government
  - Mayor (2020–2026): Catherine Biscarat
- Area^{1}: 13.93 km^{2} (5.38 sq mi)
- Elevation: 620 m (2,030 ft)
- Highest elevation: 662 m (2,172 ft)
- Lowest elevation: 337 m (1,106 ft)
- Population (2023): 274
  - Density: 19.7/km^{2} (50.9/sq mi)
- Time zone: UTC+01:00 (CET)
  - Summer (DST): UTC+02:00 (CEST)
- INSEE/Postal code: 63286 /63440
- ^{1} French Land Register data, which excludes lakes, ponds, glaciers > 1 km^{2} (0.386 sq mi or 247 acres) and river estuaries.

Pouzol (French pronunciation: [puzɔl]) is a commune in the Puy-de-Dôme department in Auvergne-Rhône-Alpes in central France.

== See also ==
- Communes of the Puy-de-Dôme department
