= Saint-Quintin-sur-Sioule =

- Commune
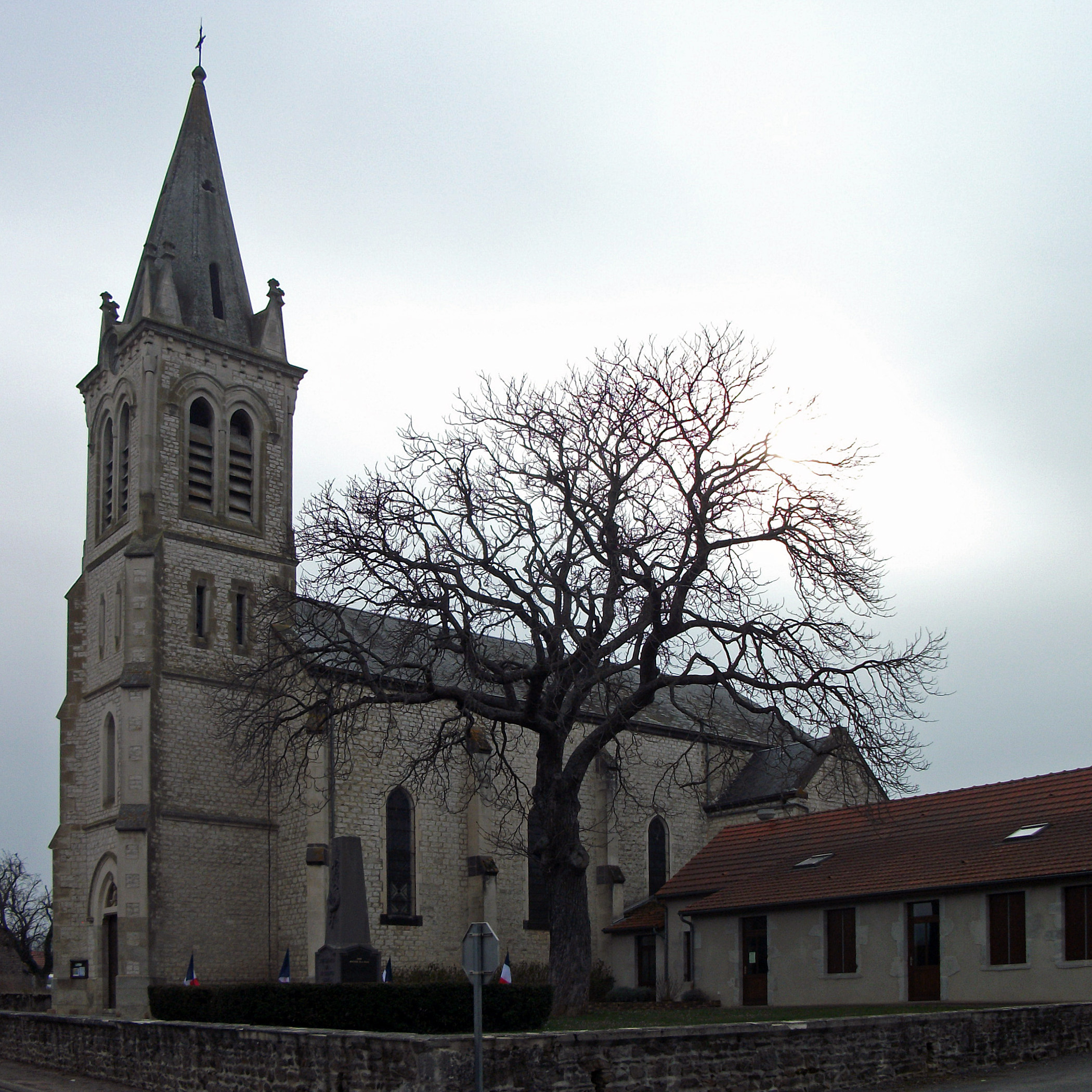
- The church in Saint-Quintin-sur-Sioule

- Coat of arms
- Location of Saint-Quintin-sur-Sioule
- Location within France Location within Auvergne-Rhône-Alpes
- Coordinates: 46°06′N 3°04′E
- Country: France
- Region: Auvergne-Rhône-Alpes
- Department: Puy-de-Dôme
- Arrondissement: Riom
- Canton: Saint-Georges-de-Mons
- Intercommunality: Combrailles Sioule et Morge

Government
  - Mayor (2020–2026): Christian Raffier
- Area^{1}: 14.32 km^{2} (5.53 sq mi)
- Elevation: 350 m (1,150 ft)
- Highest elevation: 504 m (1,654 ft)
- Lowest elevation: 306 m (1,004 ft)
- Population (2023): 387
  - Density: 27.0/km^{2} (70.0/sq mi)
- Time zone: UTC+01:00 (CET)
  - Summer (DST): UTC+02:00 (CEST)
- INSEE/Postal code: 63390 /63440
- ^{1} French Land Register data, which excludes lakes, ponds, glaciers > 1 km^{2} (0.386 sq mi or 247 acres) and river estuaries.

Saint-Quintin-sur-Sioule (French pronunciation: [sɛ̃ kɛ̃tɛ̃ syʁ sjul], literally Saint-Quintin on Sioule) is a commune in the Puy-de-Dôme department in Auvergne-Rhône-Alpes in central France.

== See also ==
- Communes of the Puy-de-Dôme department
