= Canton of Saint-Georges-de-Mons =

Coordinates: 45.94°N 2.84°E

The canton of Saint-Georges-de-Mons is an administrative division of the Puy-de-Dôme department, central France. It was created at the French canton reorganisation which came into effect in March 2015. Its seat is in Saint-Georges-de-Mons.

It consists of the following communes:

1. Les Ancizes-Comps
2. Beauregard-Vendon
3. Blot-l'Église
4. Champs
5. Charbonnières-les-Vieilles
6. Combronde
7. Davayat
8. Gimeaux
9. Jozerand
10. Lisseuil
11. Loubeyrat
12. Manzat
13. Marcillat
14. Montcel
15. Pouzol
16. Prompsat
17. Queuille
18. Saint-Angel
19. Saint-Gal-sur-Sioule
20. Saint-Georges-de-Mons
21. Saint-Hilaire-la-Croix
22. Saint-Myon
23. Saint-Pardoux
24. Saint-Quintin-sur-Sioule
25. Saint-Rémy-de-Blot
26. Teilhède
27. Vitrac
28. Yssac-la-Tourette
