= Saint-Gal-sur-Sioule =

- Commune
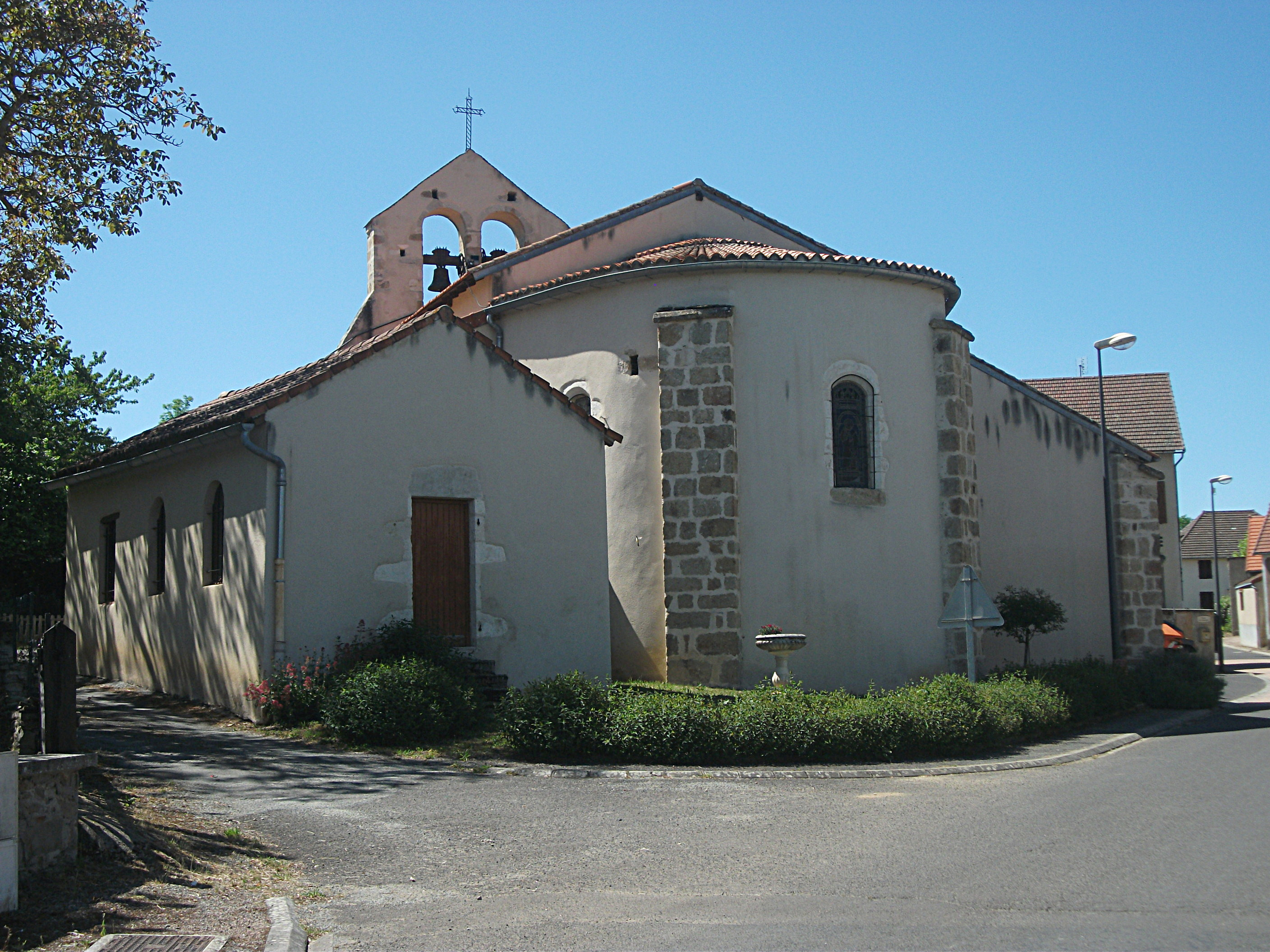
- Church

- Coat of arms
- Location of Saint-Gal-sur-Sioule
- Location within France Location within Auvergne-Rhône-Alpes
- Coordinates: 46°06′40″N 3°00′36″E
- Country: France
- Region: Auvergne-Rhône-Alpes
- Department: Puy-de-Dôme
- Arrondissement: Riom
- Canton: Saint-Georges-de-Mons
- Intercommunality: Combrailles Sioule et Morge

Government
  - Mayor (2020–2026): Charles Schiettekatte
- Area^{1}: 9.52 km^{2} (3.68 sq mi)
- Elevation: 364 m (1,194 ft)
- Highest elevation: 612 m (2,008 ft)
- Lowest elevation: 310 m (1,020 ft)
- Population (2023): 148
  - Density: 15.5/km^{2} (40.3/sq mi)
- Time zone: UTC+01:00 (CET)
  - Summer (DST): UTC+02:00 (CEST)
- INSEE/Postal code: 63344 /63440
- ^{1} French Land Register data, which excludes lakes, ponds, glaciers > 1 km^{2} (0.386 sq mi or 247 acres) and river estuaries.

Saint-Gal-sur-Sioule (French pronunciation: [sɛ̃ ɡal syʁ sjul], literally Saint-Gal on Sioule; Auvergnat: Sent Jau) is a commune in the Puy-de-Dôme department in Auvergne-Rhône-Alpes in central France.

== See also ==
- Communes of the Puy-de-Dôme department
