= Manzat =

- Commune
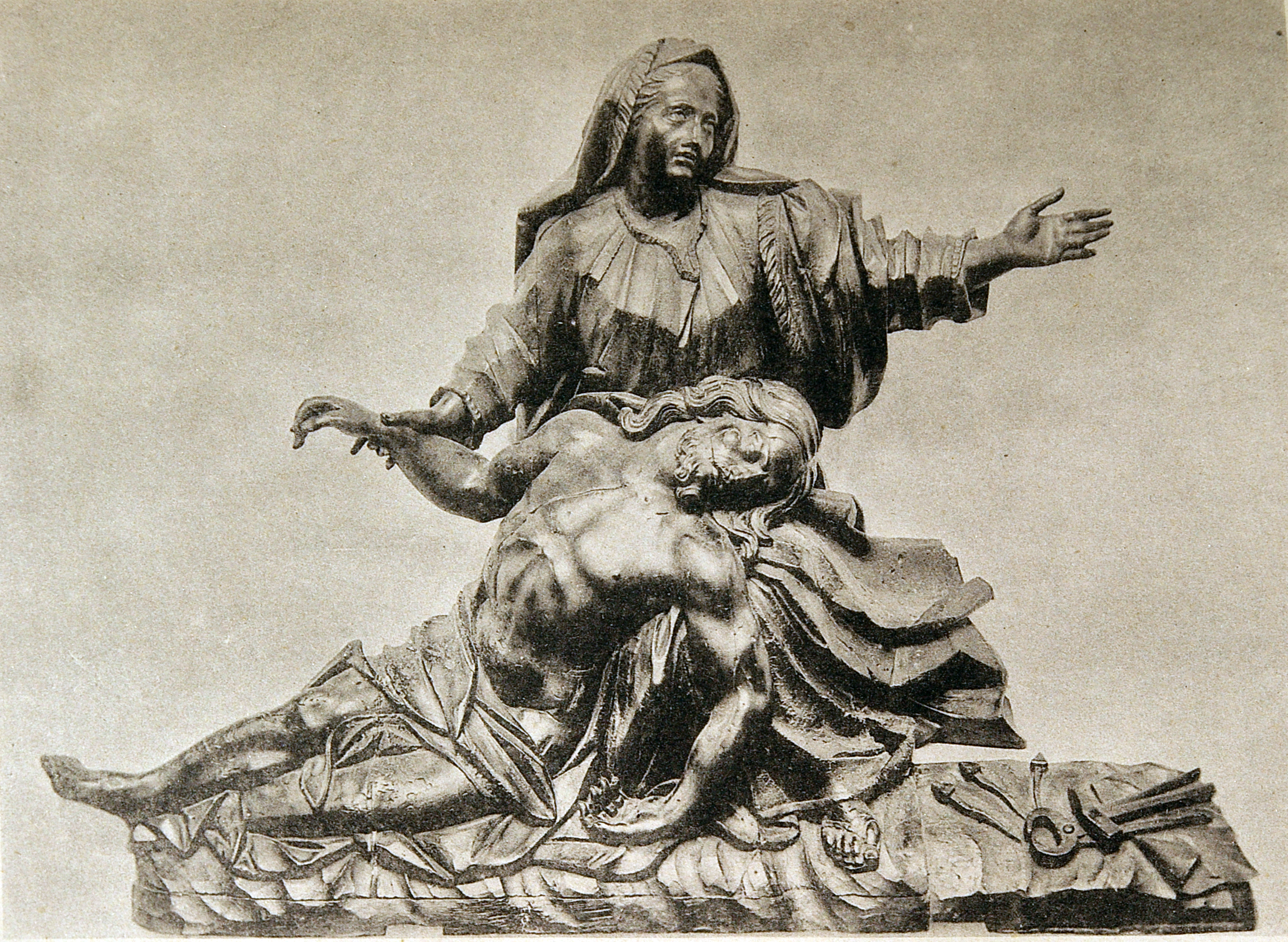
- Statue of Pietà

- Coat of arms
- Location of Manzat
- Location within France Location within Auvergne-Rhône-Alpes
- Coordinates: 45°58′00″N 2°56′00″E
- Country: France
- Region: Auvergne-Rhône-Alpes
- Department: Puy-de-Dôme
- Arrondissement: Riom
- Canton: Saint-Georges-de-Mons
- Intercommunality: CC Combrailles Sioule et Morge

Government
  - Mayor (2026–32): José Da Silva
- Area^{1}: 39.06 km^{2} (15.08 sq mi)
- Elevation: 601 m (1,972 ft)
- Highest elevation: 979 m (3,212 ft)
- Lowest elevation: 528 m (1,732 ft)
- Population (2023): 1,426
  - Density: 36.51/km^{2} (94.56/sq mi)
- Demonym: manzatois ou manzatous
- Time zone: UTC+01:00 (CET)
  - Summer (DST): UTC+02:00 (CEST)
- INSEE/Postal code: 63206 /63410
- Website: www.manzat.fr
- ^{1} French Land Register data, which excludes lakes, ponds, glaciers > 1 km^{2} (0.386 sq mi or 247 acres) and river estuaries.

Manzat (French pronunciation: [mɑ̃za]; Auvergnat: Manzac) is a commune in the Puy-de-Dôme department in Auvergne in central France.

== See also ==
- Communes of the Puy-de-Dôme department
