= Lisseuil =

- Commune
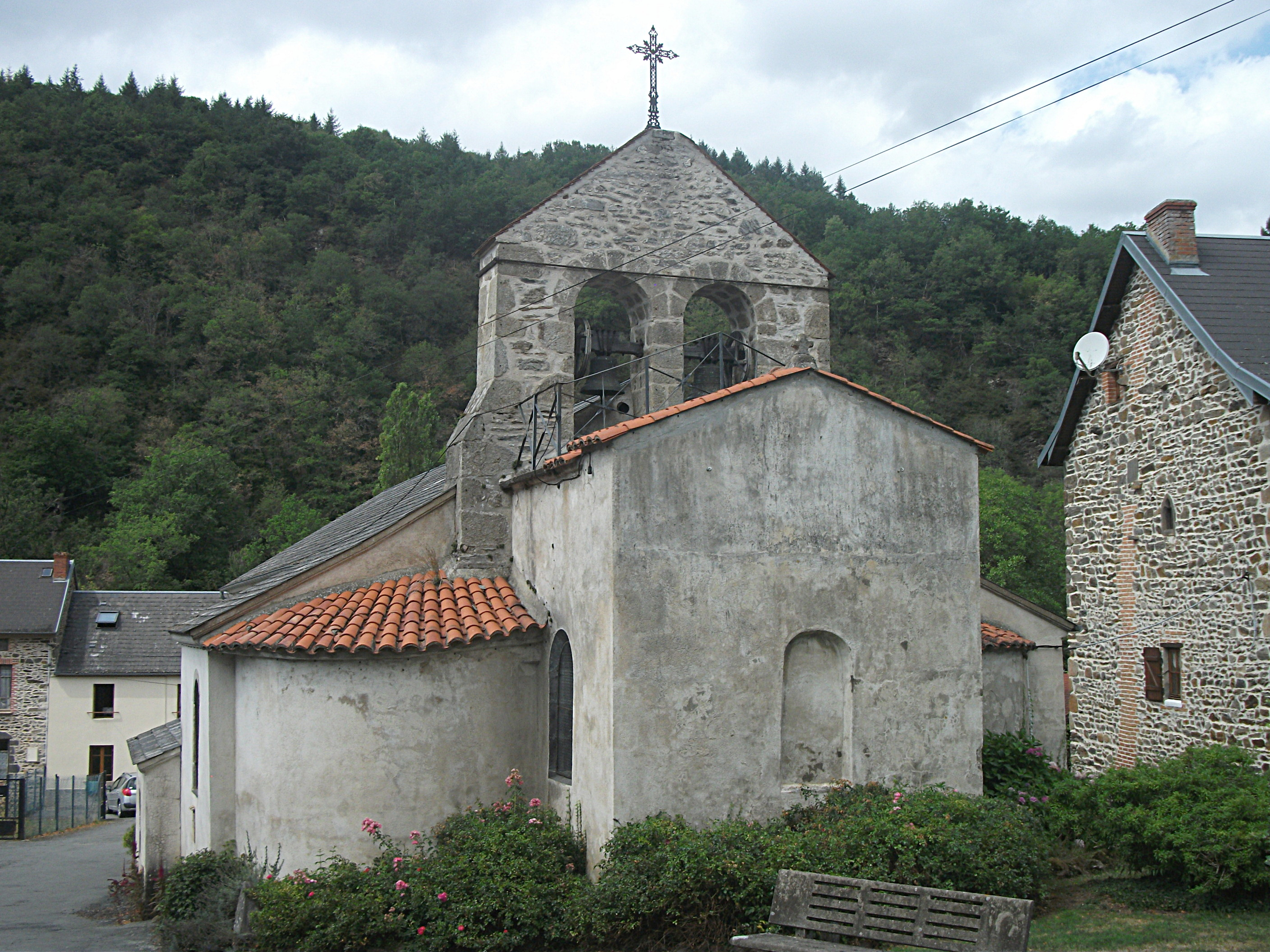
- Church
- Location of Lisseuil
- Location within France Location within Auvergne-Rhône-Alpes
- Coordinates: 46°03′51″N 2°55′10″E
- Country: France
- Region: Auvergne-Rhône-Alpes
- Department: Puy-de-Dôme
- Arrondissement: Riom
- Canton: Saint-Georges-de-Mons
- Intercommunality: CC Combrailles Sioule et Morge

Government
  - Mayor (2020–2026): Martial Gendre
- Area^{1}: 6.88 km^{2} (2.66 sq mi)
- Elevation: 415 m (1,362 ft)
- Highest elevation: 644 m (2,113 ft)
- Lowest elevation: 360 m (1,180 ft)
- Population (2023): 107
  - Density: 15.6/km^{2} (40.3/sq mi)
- Time zone: UTC+01:00 (CET)
  - Summer (DST): UTC+02:00 (CEST)
- INSEE/Postal code: 63197 /63440
- ^{1} French Land Register data, which excludes lakes, ponds, glaciers > 1 km^{2} (0.386 sq mi or 247 acres) and river estuaries.

Lisseuil (French pronunciation: [lisœj]; Occitan: Lhieseiles) is a commune in the Puy-de-Dôme department in Auvergne-Rhône-Alpes in central France.

== See also ==
- Communes of the Puy-de-Dôme department
