= Davayat =

- Commune
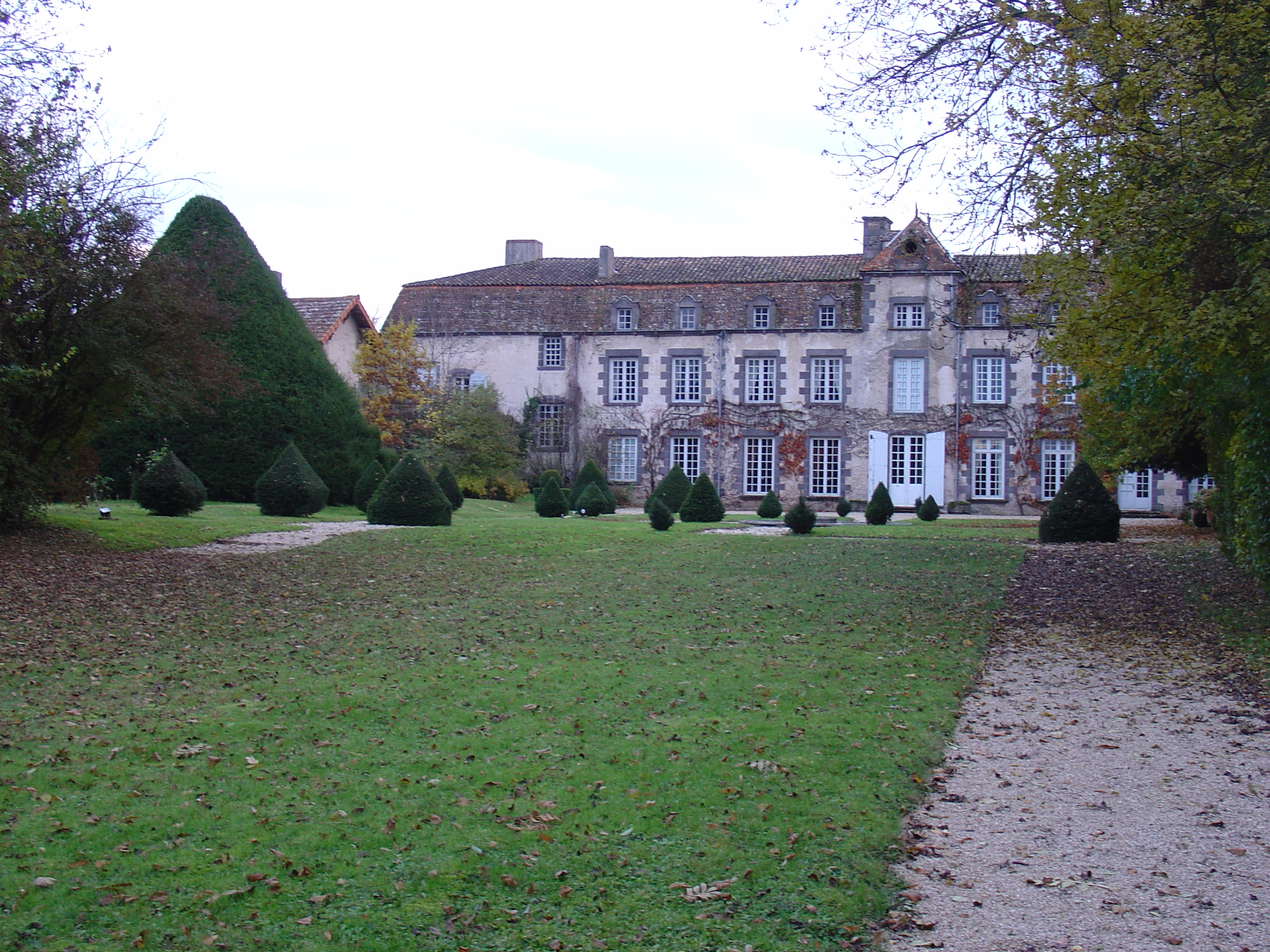
- The chateau in Davayat
- Location of Davayat
- Location within France Location within Auvergne-Rhône-Alpes
- Coordinates: 45°56′53″N 3°06′34″E
- Country: France
- Region: Auvergne-Rhône-Alpes
- Department: Puy-de-Dôme
- Arrondissement: Riom
- Canton: Saint-Georges-de-Mons
- Intercommunality: Combrailles Sioule et Morge

Government
  - Mayor (2020–2026): Jean-Louis Fabre
- Area^{1}: 2.33 km^{2} (0.90 sq mi)
- Elevation: 367 m (1,204 ft)
- Highest elevation: 369 m (1,211 ft)
- Lowest elevation: 338 m (1,109 ft)
- Population (2023): 666
  - Density: 286/km^{2} (740/sq mi)
- Time zone: UTC+01:00 (CET)
  - Summer (DST): UTC+02:00 (CEST)
- INSEE/Postal code: 63135 /63200
- ^{1} French Land Register data, which excludes lakes, ponds, glaciers > 1 km^{2} (0.386 sq mi or 247 acres) and river estuaries.

Davayat (French pronunciation: [davaja]) is a commune in the Puy-de-Dôme department in Auvergne-Rhône-Alpes in central France.

== See also ==
- Communes of the Puy-de-Dôme department
