= Blot-l'Église =

- Commune
- Location of Blot-l'Église
- Location within France Location within Auvergne-Rhône-Alpes
- Coordinates: 46°02′18″N 2°57′20″E
- Country: France
- Region: Auvergne-Rhône-Alpes
- Department: Puy-de-Dôme
- Arrondissement: Riom
- Canton: Saint-Georges-de-Mons

Government
  - Mayor (2026–32): Bernard Bouleau
- Area^{1}: 25.29 km^{2} (9.76 sq mi)
- Elevation: 630 m (2,070 ft)
- Highest elevation: 748 m (2,454 ft)
- Lowest elevation: 365 m (1,198 ft)
- Population (2023): 436
  - Density: 17.2/km^{2} (44.7/sq mi)
- Time zone: UTC+01:00 (CET)
  - Summer (DST): UTC+02:00 (CEST)
- INSEE/Postal code: 63043 /63440
- ^{1} French Land Register data, which excludes lakes, ponds, glaciers > 1 km^{2} (0.386 sq mi or 247 acres) and river estuaries.

Blot-l'Église (French pronunciation: [blɔ leɡliz]) is a commune in the Puy-de-Dôme department in Auvergne-Rhône-Alpes in central France.

== Population ==
Historical population
Year	Pop.	±% p.a.
1968	525	—
1975	475	−1.42%
1982	451	−0.74%
1990	392	−1.74%
1999	357	−1.03%
2007	390	+1.11%
2012	391	+0.05%
2017	421	+1.49%
2023	436	+0.59%
Source: INSEE

== See also ==
- Communes of the Puy-de-Dôme department
