= Saint-Pardoux, Puy-de-Dôme =

Saint-Pardoux
- Commune
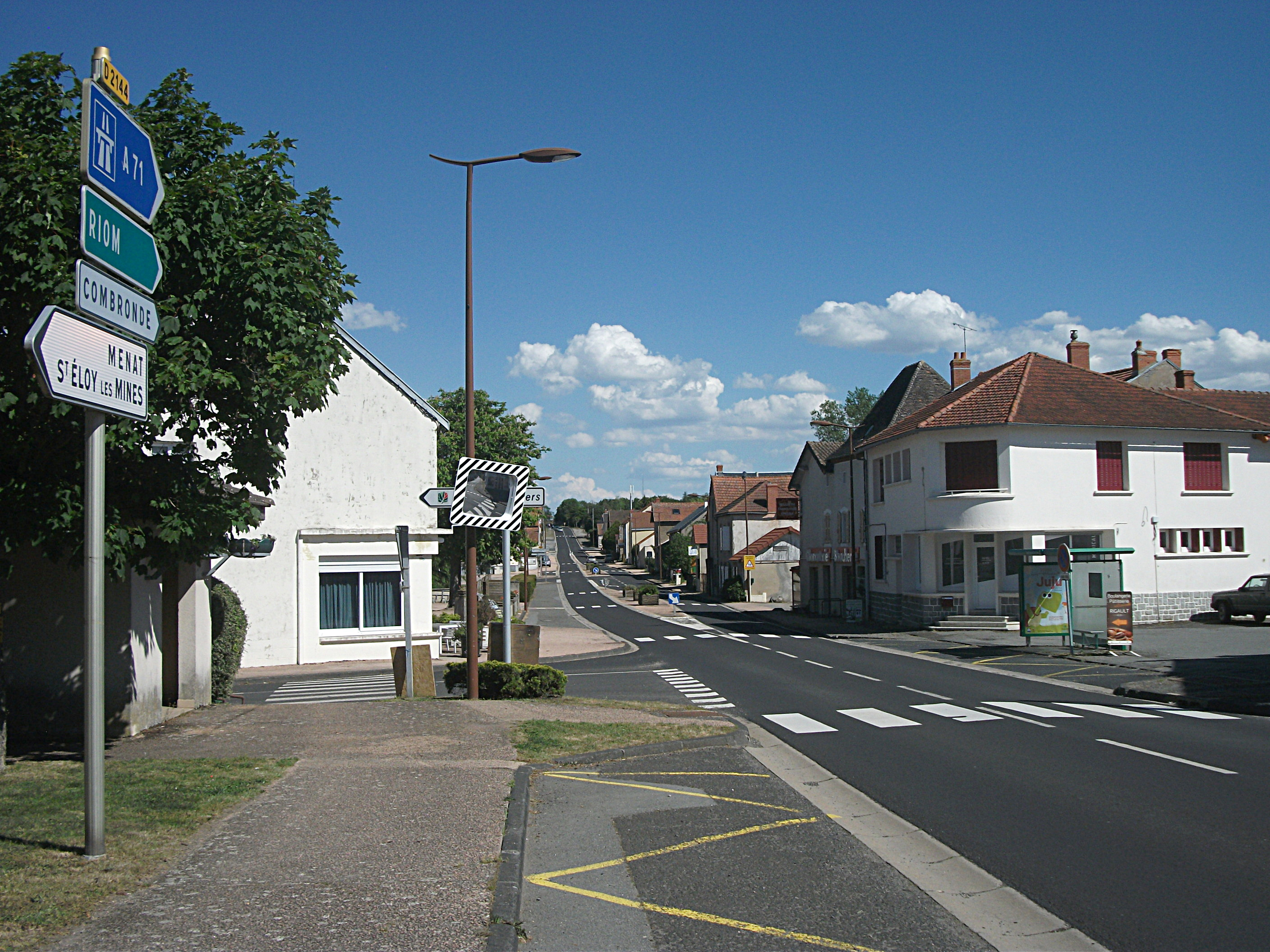
- Main road (D 2144 towards Riom).
- Location of Saint-Pardoux
- Location within France Location within Auvergne-Rhône-Alpes
- Coordinates: 46°03′27″N 3°01′05″E
- Country: France
- Region: Auvergne-Rhône-Alpes
- Department: Puy-de-Dôme
- Arrondissement: Riom
- Canton: Saint-Georges-de-Mons
- Intercommunality: Combrailles Sioule et Morge

Government
  - Mayor (2020–2026): Chantal Pieuchot-Monnet
- Area^{1}: 15.99 km^{2} (6.17 sq mi)
- Elevation: 638 m (2,093 ft)
- Highest elevation: 670 m (2,200 ft)
- Lowest elevation: 478 m (1,568 ft)
- Population (2023): 428
  - Density: 26.8/km^{2} (69.3/sq mi)
- Time zone: UTC+01:00 (CET)
  - Summer (DST): UTC+02:00 (CEST)
- INSEE/Postal code: 63382 /63440
- ^{1} French Land Register data, which excludes lakes, ponds, glaciers > 1 km^{2} (0.386 sq mi or 247 acres) and river estuaries.

Saint-Pardoux (French pronunciation: [sɛ̃ paʁdu]; Auvergnat: Sent Pardós) is a commune in the Puy-de-Dôme department in Auvergne-Rhône-Alpes in central France.

== See also ==
- Communes of the Puy-de-Dôme department
