= Queuille =

- Commune
- Coat of arms
- Location of Queuille
- Location within France Location within Auvergne-Rhône-Alpes
- Coordinates: 45°58′16″N 2°50′38″E
- Country: France
- Region: Auvergne-Rhône-Alpes
- Department: Puy-de-Dôme
- Arrondissement: Riom
- Canton: Saint-Georges-de-Mons

Government
  - Mayor (2026–32): Stéphane Canuto
- Area^{1}: 10.03 km^{2} (3.87 sq mi)
- Elevation: 700 m (2,300 ft)
- Highest elevation: 746 m (2,448 ft)
- Lowest elevation: 428 m (1,404 ft)
- Population (2023): 284
  - Density: 28.3/km^{2} (73.3/sq mi)
- Time zone: UTC+01:00 (CET)
  - Summer (DST): UTC+02:00 (CEST)
- INSEE/Postal code: 63294 /63780
- ^{1} French Land Register data, which excludes lakes, ponds, glaciers > 1 km^{2} (0.386 sq mi or 247 acres) and river estuaries.

Queuille (French pronunciation: [kœj]; Occitan: Quelha) is a commune in the Puy-de-Dôme department in Auvergne in central France.

== See also ==
- Communes of the Puy-de-Dôme department
