= Champs, Puy-de-Dôme =

Champs
- Commune
- Location of Champs
- Location within France Location within Auvergne-Rhône-Alpes
- Coordinates: 46°03′34″N 3°05′09″E
- Country: France
- Region: Auvergne-Rhône-Alpes
- Department: Puy-de-Dôme
- Arrondissement: Riom
- Canton: Saint-Georges-de-Mons

Government
  - Mayor (2020–2026): Guillaume Crispyn
- Area^{1}: 15.13 km^{2} (5.84 sq mi)
- Elevation: 550 m (1,800 ft)
- Highest elevation: 607 m (1,991 ft)
- Lowest elevation: 375 m (1,230 ft)
- Population (2023): 441
  - Density: 29.1/km^{2} (75.5/sq mi)
- Time zone: UTC+01:00 (CET)
  - Summer (DST): UTC+02:00 (CEST)
- INSEE/Postal code: 63082 /63440
- ^{1} French Land Register data, which excludes lakes, ponds, glaciers > 1 km^{2} (0.386 sq mi or 247 acres) and river estuaries.

Champs (French pronunciation: [ʃɑ̃]) is a commune in the Puy-de-Dôme department in Auvergne-Rhône-Alpes in central France.

== See also ==
- Communes of the Puy-de-Dôme department
