= Arrondissement of Riom =

Coordinates: 45°53′32″N 3°06′40″E

Riom
- Arrondissement
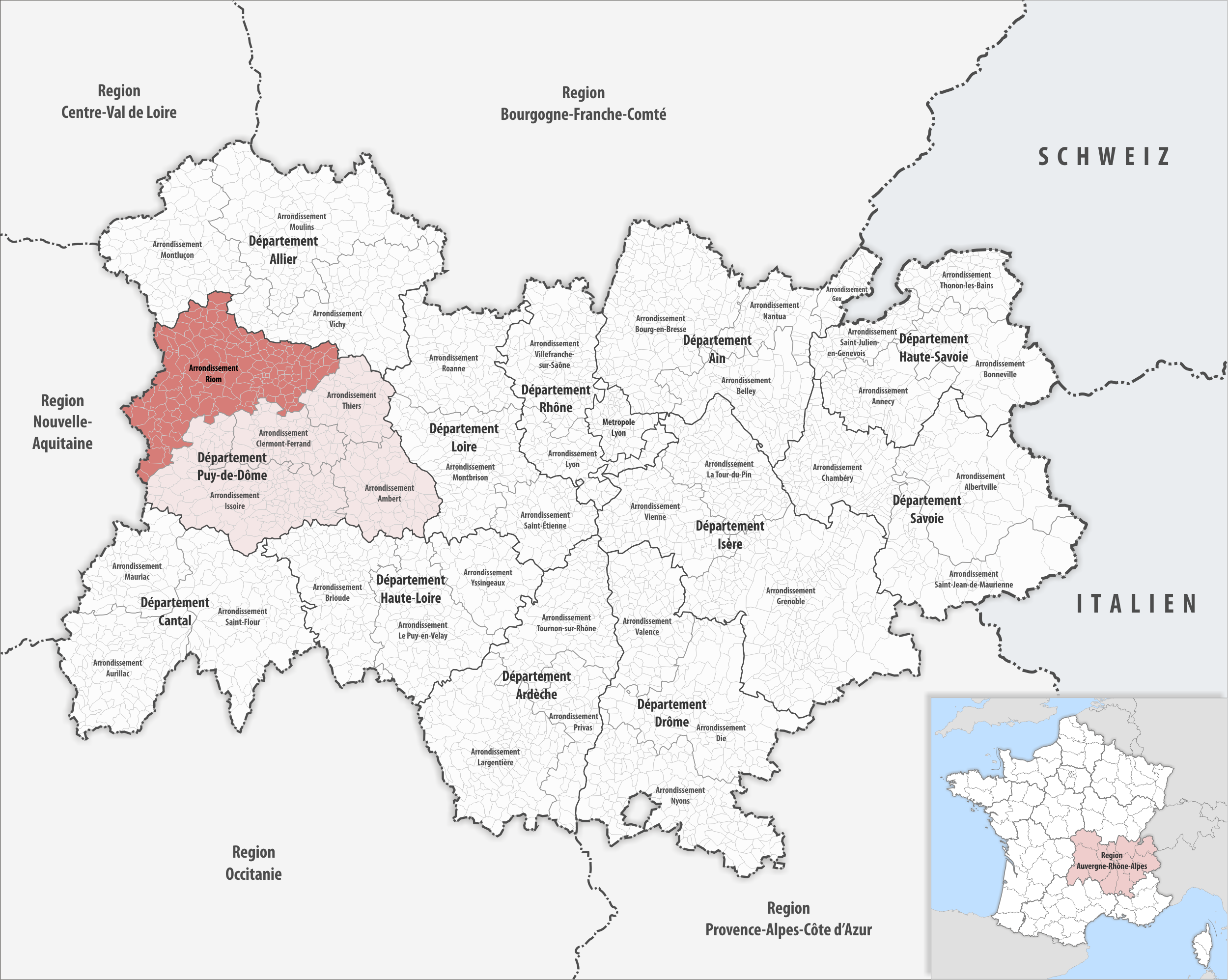
- Location within the region Auvergne-Rhône-Alpes
- Country: France
- Region: Auvergne-Rhône-Alpes
- Department: Puy-de-Dôme
- No. of communes: {{{nbcomm}}}
- Area: 2,705.3 km^{2} (1,044.5 sq mi)
- Population (2023): 138,294
  - Density: 51.120/km^{2} (132.40/sq mi)
- INSEE code: 634

The arrondissement of Riom is an arrondissement of France in the Puy-de-Dôme department in the Auvergne-Rhône-Alpes region. It has 155 communes. Its population is 137,149 (2021), and its area is 2,705.3 km^{2} (1,044.5 sq mi).

== Composition ==
The communes of the arrondissement of Riom, and their INSEE codes, are:

1. Aigueperse (63001)
2. Les Ancizes-Comps (63004)
3. Ars-les-Favets (63011)
4. Artonne (63012)
5. Aubiat (63013)
6. Ayat-sur-Sioule (63025)
7. Bas-et-Lezat (63030)
8. Beaumont-lès-Randan (63033)
9. Beauregard-Vendon (63035)
10. Biollet (63041)
11. Blot-l'Église (63043)
12. Bourg-Lastic (63048)
13. Briffons (63053)
14. Bromont-Lamothe (63055)
15. Bussières (63060)
16. Bussières-et-Pruns (63061)
17. Buxières-sous-Montaigut (63062)
18. La Celle (63064)
19. La Cellette (63067)
20. Chambaron-sur-Morge (63244)
21. Champs (63082)
22. Chanat-la-Mouteyre (63083)
23. Chapdes-Beaufort (63085)
24. Chappes (63089)
25. Chaptuzat (63090)
26. Charbonnières-les-Varennes (63092)
27. Charbonnières-les-Vieilles (63093)
28. Charensat (63094)
29. Châteauneuf-les-Bains (63100)
30. Château-sur-Cher (63101)
31. Châtel-Guyon (63103)
32. Chavaroux (63107)
33. Le Cheix-sur-Morge (63108)
34. Cisternes-la-Forêt (63110)
35. Clerlande (63112)
36. Combrailles (63115)
37. Combronde (63116)
38. Condat-en-Combraille (63118)
39. La Crouzille (63130)
40. Davayat (63135)
41. Durmignat (63140)
42. Effiat (63143)
43. Ennezat (63148)
44. Entraigues (63149)
45. Enval (63150)
46. Espinasse (63152)
47. Fernoël (63159)
48. Giat (63165)
49. Gimeaux (63167)
50. La Goutelle (63170)
51. Gouttières (63171)
52. Herment (63175)
53. Jozerand (63181)
54. Landogne (63186)
55. Lapeyrouse (63187)
56. Lastic (63191)
57. Limons (63196)
58. Lisseuil (63197)
59. Loubeyrat (63198)
60. Lussat (63200)
61. Luzillat (63201)
62. Malauzat (63203)
63. Malintrat (63204)
64. Manzat (63206)
65. Marcillat (63208)
66. Maringues (63210)
67. Marsat (63212)
68. Les Martres-d'Artière (63213)
69. Martres-sur-Morge (63215)
70. Menat (63223)
71. Ménétrol (63224)
72. Messeix (63225)
73. Miremont (63228)
74. Mons (63232)
75. Montaigut (63233)
76. Montcel (63235)
77. Montel-de-Gelat (63237)
78. Montfermy (63238)
79. Montpensier (63240)
80. Moureuille (63243)
81. Mozac (63245)
82. Neuf-Église (63251)
83. Pessat-Villeneuve (63278)
84. Pionsat (63281)
85. Pontaumur (63283)
86. Pontgibaud (63285)
87. Pouzol (63286)
88. Prompsat (63288)
89. Prondines (63289)
90. Pulvérières (63290)
91. Puy-Saint-Gulmier (63292)
92. Le Quartier (63293)
93. Queuille (63294)
94. Randan (63295)
95. Riom (63300)
96. Roche-d'Agoux (63304)
97. Saint-Agoulin (63311)
98. Saint-André-le-Coq (63317)
99. Saint-Angel (63318)
100. Saint-Avit (63320)
101. Saint-Beauzire (63322)
102. Saint-Bonnet-près-Riom (63327)
103. Saint-Clément-de-Régnat (63332)
104. Saint-Denis-Combarnazat (63333)
105. Sainte-Christine (63329)
106. Saint-Éloy-les-Mines (63338)
107. Saint-Étienne-des-Champs (63339)
108. Saint-Gal-sur-Sioule (63344)
109. Saint-Genès-du-Retz (63347)
110. Saint-Georges-de-Mons (63349)
111. Saint-Germain-près-Herment (63351)
112. Saint-Gervais-d'Auvergne (63354)
113. Saint-Hilaire (63360)
114. Saint-Hilaire-la-Croix (63358)
115. Saint-Hilaire-les-Monges (63359)
116. Saint-Ignat (63362)
117. Saint-Jacques-d'Ambur (63363)
118. Saint-Julien-la-Geneste (63369)
119. Saint-Laure (63372)
120. Saint-Maigner (63373)
121. Saint-Maurice-près-Pionsat (63377)
122. Saint-Myon (63379)
123. Saint-Ours (63381)
124. Saint-Pardoux (63382)
125. Saint-Pierre-le-Chastel (63385)
126. Saint-Priest-Bramefant (63387)
127. Saint-Priest-des-Champs (63388)
128. Saint-Quintin-sur-Sioule (63390)
129. Saint-Rémy-de-Blot (63391)
130. Saint-Sulpice (63399)
131. Saint-Sylvestre-Pragoulin (63400)
132. Sardon (63406)
133. Sauret-Besserve (63408)
134. Sauvagnat (63410)
135. Savennes (63416)
136. Sayat (63417)
137. Servant (63419)
138. Surat (63424)
139. Teilhède (63427)
140. Teilhet (63428)
141. Thuret (63432)
142. Tortebesse (63433)
143. Tralaigues (63436)
144. Varennes-sur-Morge (63443)
145. Vensat (63446)
146. Vergheas (63447)
147. Verneugheol (63450)
148. Villeneuve-les-Cerfs (63459)
149. Villossanges (63460)
150. Virlet (63462)
151. Vitrac (63464)
152. Voingt (63467)
153. Volvic (63470)
154. Youx (63471)
155. Yssac-la-Tourette (63473)

== History ==
The arrondissement of Riom was created in 1800. At the January 2017 reorganisation of the arrondissements of Puy-de-Dôme, it gained 17 communes from the arrondissement of Clermont-Ferrand and three communes from the arrondissement of Thiers, and it lost one commune to the arrondissement of Clermont-Ferrand.

As a result of the reorganisation of the cantons of France which came into effect in 2015, the borders of the cantons are no longer related to the borders of the arrondissements. The cantons of the arrondissement of Riom were, as of January 2015:

1. Aigueperse
2. Combronde
3. Ennezat
4. Manzat
5. Menat
6. Montaigut
7. Pionsat
8. Pontaumur
9. Pontgibaud
10. Randan
11. Riom-Est
12. Riom-Ouest
13. Saint-Gervais-d'Auvergne
