= Prompsat =

- Commune
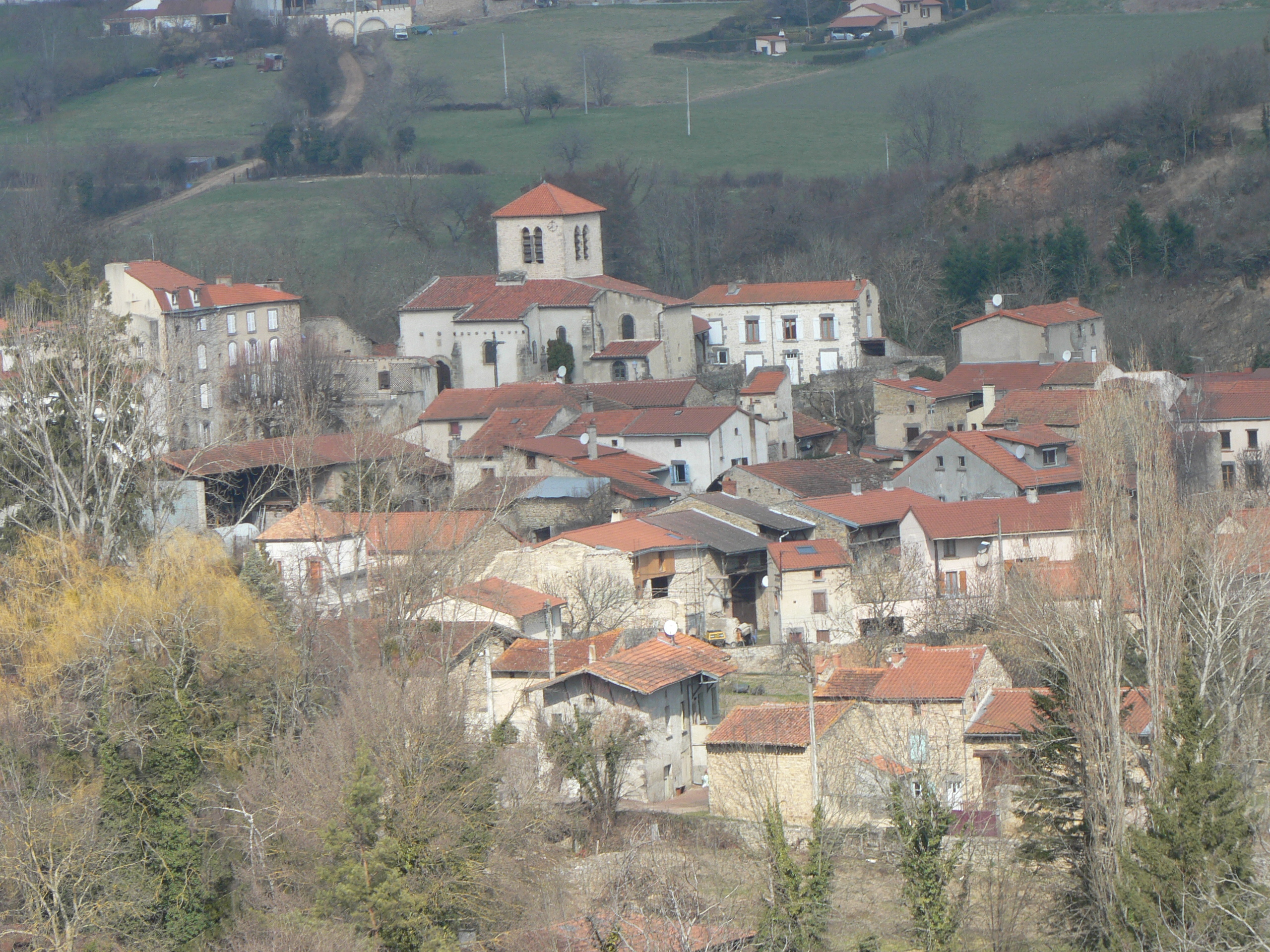
- A general view of Prompsat

- Coat of arms
- Location of Prompsat
- Location within France Location within Auvergne-Rhône-Alpes
- Coordinates: 45°57′N 3°04′E
- Country: France
- Region: Auvergne-Rhône-Alpes
- Department: Puy-de-Dôme
- Arrondissement: Riom
- Canton: Saint-Georges-de-Mons
- Intercommunality: Combrailles Sioule et Morge
- Area^{1}: 4.23 km^{2} (1.63 sq mi)
- Elevation: 450 m (1,480 ft)
- Highest elevation: 669 m (2,195 ft)
- Lowest elevation: 372 m (1,220 ft)
- Population (2023): 472
  - Density: 112/km^{2} (289/sq mi)
- Time zone: UTC+01:00 (CET)
  - Summer (DST): UTC+02:00 (CEST)
- INSEE/Postal code: 63288 /63200
- ^{1} French Land Register data, which excludes lakes, ponds, glaciers > 1 km^{2} (0.386 sq mi or 247 acres) and river estuaries.

Prompsat is a commune in the Puy-de-Dôme department in Auvergne in central France.

== See also ==
- Communes of the Puy-de-Dôme department
