= Saint-Angel, Puy-de-Dôme =

Saint-Angel
- Commune
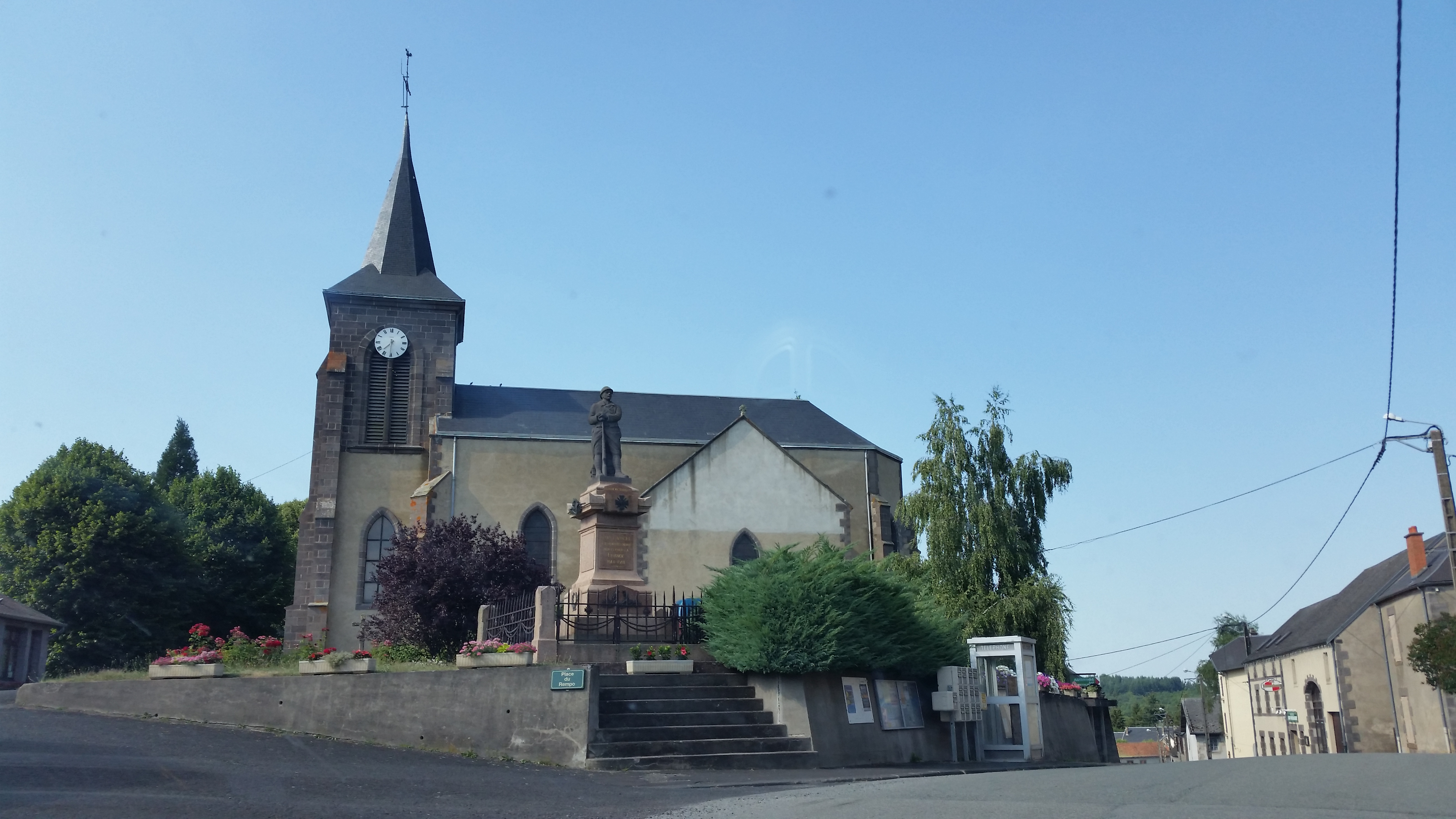
- The church in Saint-Angel

- Coat of arms
- Location of Saint-Angel
- Location within France Location within Auvergne-Rhône-Alpes
- Coordinates: 45°59′49″N 2°56′06″E
- Country: France
- Region: Auvergne-Rhône-Alpes
- Department: Puy-de-Dôme
- Arrondissement: Riom
- Canton: Saint-Georges-de-Mons
- Intercommunality: Combrailles Sioule et Morge

Government
  - Mayor (2020–2026): Sidonio Da Silva
- Area^{1}: 17.89 km^{2} (6.91 sq mi)
- Elevation: 666 m (2,185 ft)
- Highest elevation: 736 m (2,415 ft)
- Lowest elevation: 386 m (1,266 ft)
- Population (2023): 467
  - Density: 26.1/km^{2} (67.6/sq mi)
- Time zone: UTC+01:00 (CET)
  - Summer (DST): UTC+02:00 (CEST)
- INSEE/Postal code: 63318 /63410
- ^{1} French Land Register data, which excludes lakes, ponds, glaciers > 1 km^{2} (0.386 sq mi or 247 acres) and river estuaries.

Saint-Angel (French pronunciation: [sɛ̃.t‿ɑ̃ʒɛl]) is a commune in the Puy-de-Dôme department in Auvergne in central France.

== See also ==
- Communes of the Puy-de-Dôme department
