= Montcel, Puy-de-Dôme =

Montcel
- Commune
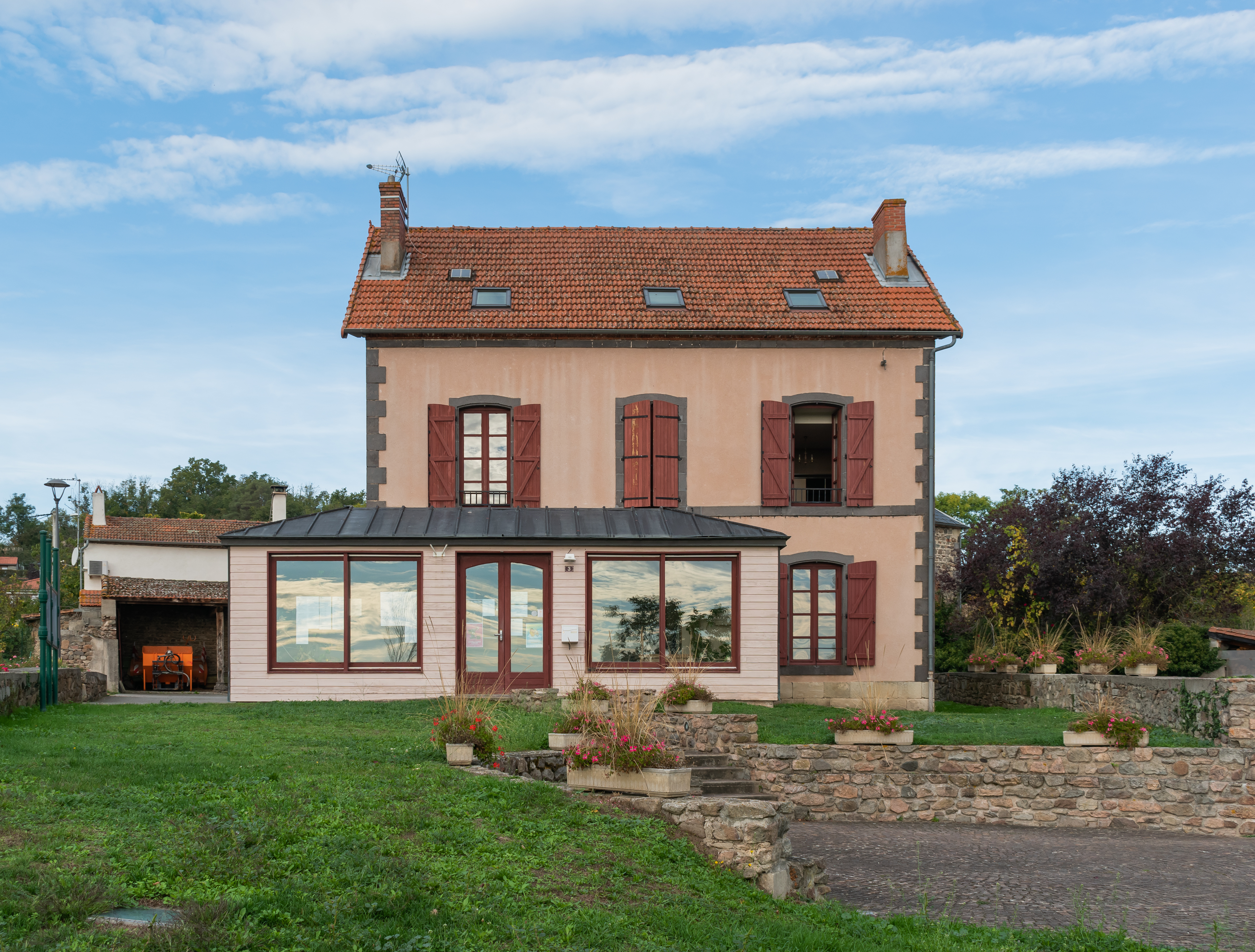
- Town hall of Montcel, Puy-de-Dome

- Coat of arms
- Location of Montcel
- Location within France Location within Auvergne-Rhône-Alpes
- Coordinates: 46°00′56″N 3°04′00″E
- Country: France
- Region: Auvergne-Rhône-Alpes
- Department: Puy-de-Dôme
- Arrondissement: Riom
- Canton: Saint-Georges-de-Mons
- Intercommunality: CC Combrailles Sioule et Morge

Government
  - Mayor (2026–32): Grégory Bonnet
- Area^{1}: 9.43 km^{2} (3.64 sq mi)
- Elevation: 450 m (1,480 ft)
- Highest elevation: 600 m (2,000 ft)
- Lowest elevation: 368 m (1,207 ft)
- Population (2023): 550
  - Density: 58/km^{2} (150/sq mi)
- Time zone: UTC+01:00 (CET)
  - Summer (DST): UTC+02:00 (CEST)
- INSEE/Postal code: 63235 /63460
- ^{1} French Land Register data, which excludes lakes, ponds, glaciers > 1 km^{2} (0.386 sq mi or 247 acres) and river estuaries.

Montcel (French pronunciation: [mɔ̃sɛl]) is a commune in the Puy-de-Dôme department in Auvergne in central France.

== See also ==
- Communes of the Puy-de-Dôme department
