= Vitrac, Puy-de-Dôme =

Vitrac
- Commune
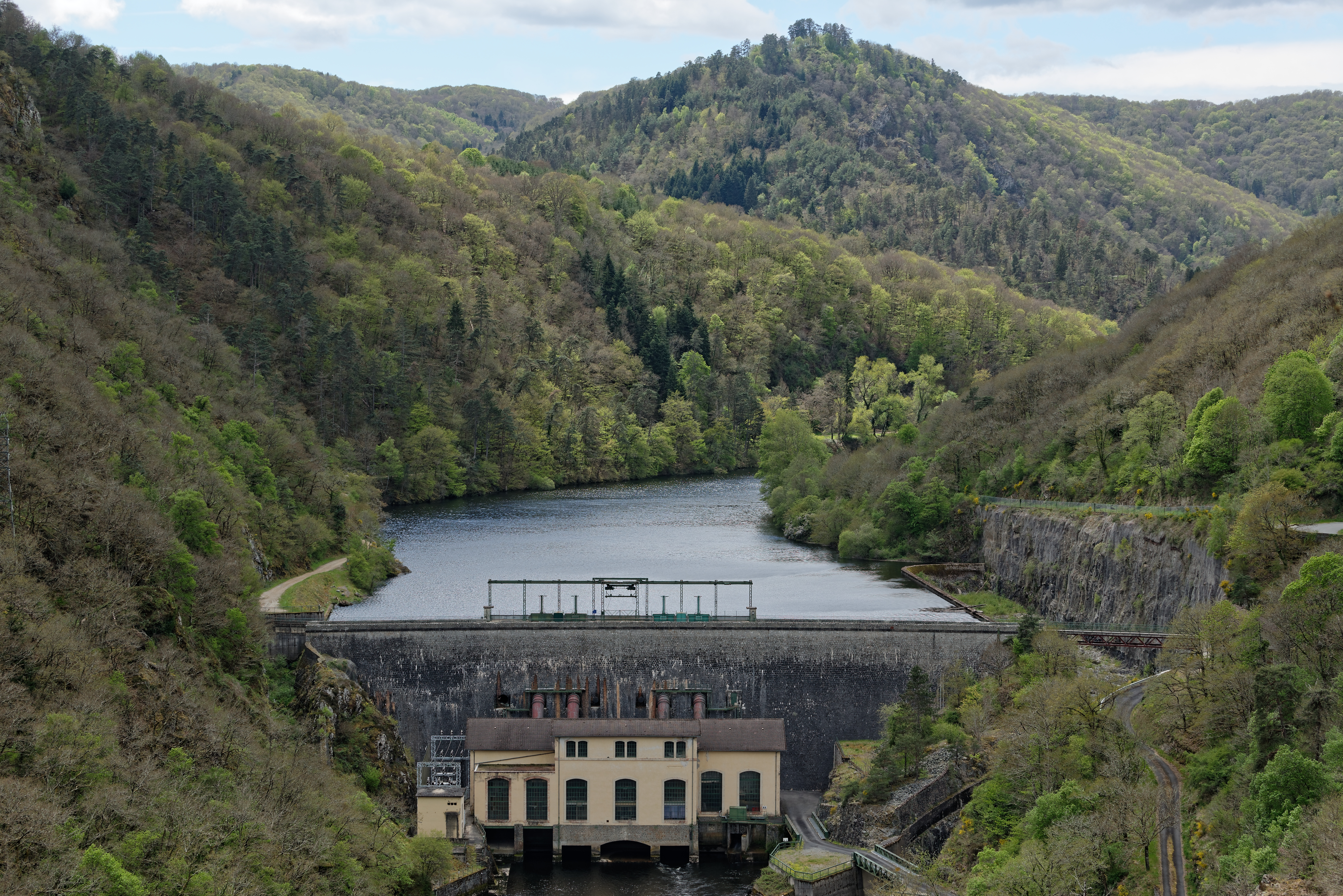
- The Queuille dam in Vitrac

- Coat of arms
- Location of Vitrac
- Location within France Location within Auvergne-Rhône-Alpes
- Coordinates: 45°58′13″N 2°52′40″E
- Country: France
- Region: Auvergne-Rhône-Alpes
- Department: Puy-de-Dôme
- Arrondissement: Riom
- Canton: Saint-Georges-de-Mons
- Intercommunality: Combrailles Sioule et Morge

Government
  - Mayor (2020–2026): Gérard Soulier
- Area^{1}: 13.23 km^{2} (5.11 sq mi)
- Elevation: 725 m (2,379 ft)
- Highest elevation: 759 m (2,490 ft)
- Lowest elevation: 393 m (1,289 ft)
- Population (2023): 336
  - Density: 25.4/km^{2} (65.8/sq mi)
- Time zone: UTC+01:00 (CET)
  - Summer (DST): UTC+02:00 (CEST)
- INSEE/Postal code: 63464 /63410
- ^{1} French Land Register data, which excludes lakes, ponds, glaciers > 1 km^{2} (0.386 sq mi or 247 acres) and river estuaries.

Vitrac (French pronunciation: [vitʁak]) is a commune in the Puy-de-Dôme department in Auvergne-Rhône-Alpes in central France.

== See also ==
- Communes of the Puy-de-Dôme department
