= Aigueperse, Puy-de-Dôme =

Aigueperse
- Commune
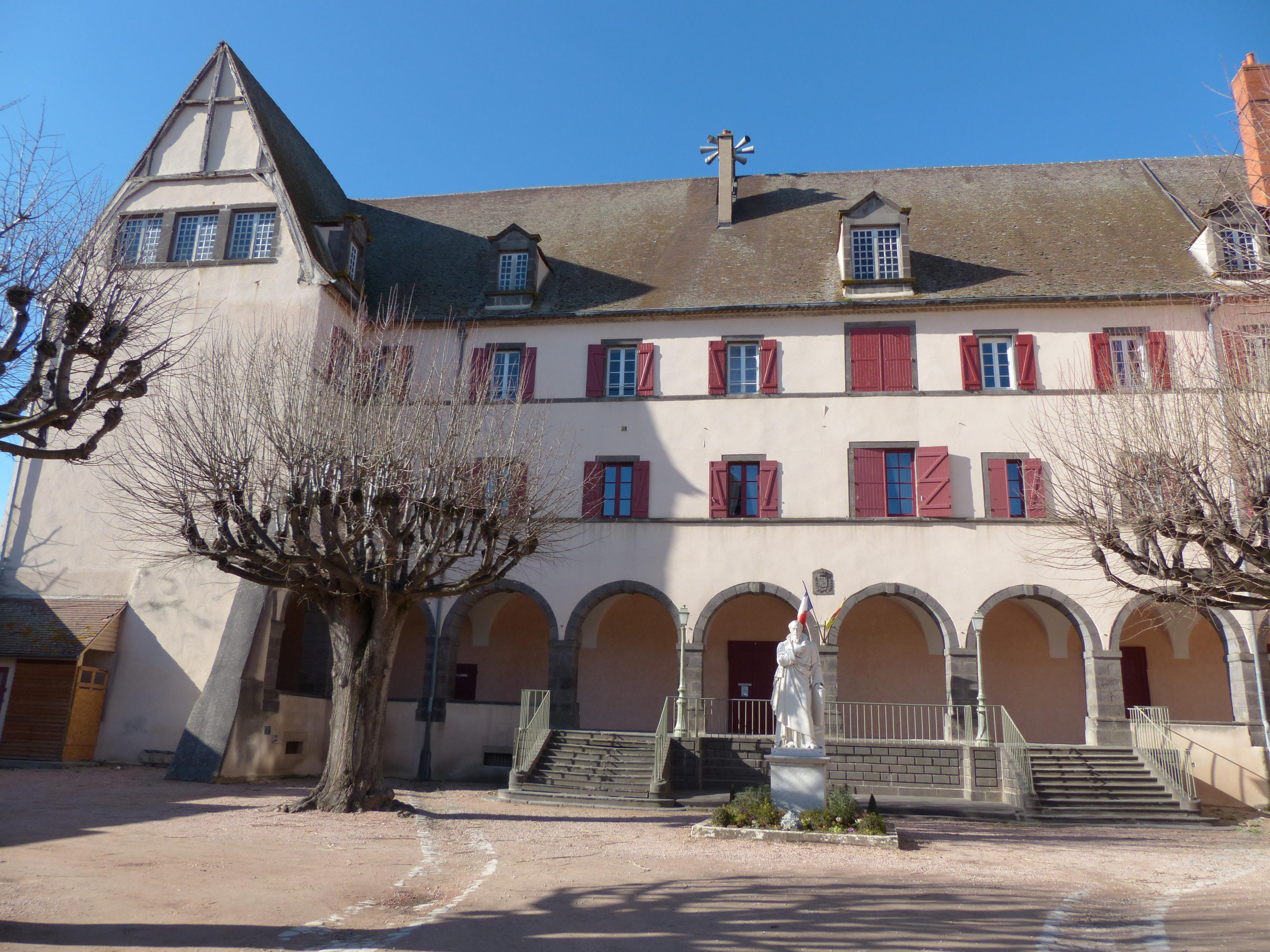
- The town hall in Aigueperse

- Coat of arms
- Location of Aigueperse
- Location within France Location within Auvergne-Rhône-Alpes
- Coordinates: 46°01′24″N 3°12′11″E
- Country: France
- Region: Auvergne-Rhône-Alpes
- Department: Puy-de-Dôme
- Arrondissement: Riom
- Canton: Aigueperse
- Intercommunality: Plaine Limagne

Government
  - Mayor (2026–32): Luc Chaput
- Area^{1}: 10.50 km^{2} (4.05 sq mi)
- Elevation: 356 m (1,168 ft)
- Highest elevation: 422 m (1,385 ft)
- Lowest elevation: 338 m (1,109 ft)
- Population (2023): 2,665
  - Density: 253.8/km^{2} (657.4/sq mi)
- Time zone: UTC+01:00 (CET)
  - Summer (DST): UTC+02:00 (CEST)
- INSEE/Postal code: 63001 /63260
- ^{1} French Land Register data, which excludes lakes, ponds, glaciers > 1 km^{2} (0.386 sq mi or 247 acres) and river estuaries.

Aigueperse (French pronunciation: [ɛɡpɛʁs]; Auvergnat: Guiparsa) is a commune in the Puy-de-Dôme department in Auvergne-Rhône-Alpes in central France.

== Population ==
Historical population
| Year | Pop. | ±% p.a. |
|---|---|---|
| 1968 | 2,273 | — |
| 1975 | 2,680 | +2.38% |
| 1982 | 2,734 | +0.29% |
| 1990 | 2,534 | −0.95% |
| 1999 | 2,504 | −0.13% |
| 2007 | 2,522 | +0.09% |
| 2012 | 2,630 | +0.84% |
| 2017 | 2,732 | +0.76% |
| 2023 | 2,665 | −0.41% |
Source: INSEE

== Personalities ==
Aigueperse was the birthplace of:

- Michel de l'Hôpital (c. 1505–1573), statesman
- Jacques Delille (1738–1813), poet, said to be a descendant of the former

== See also ==
- Château de la Canière
- Communes of the Puy-de-Dôme department
