= Lussat =

Lussat may refer to the following places in France:

- Lussat, Creuse, a commune in the Creuse department
- Lussat, Puy-de-Dôme, a commune in the Puy-de-Dôme department
