= Artonne =

- Commune
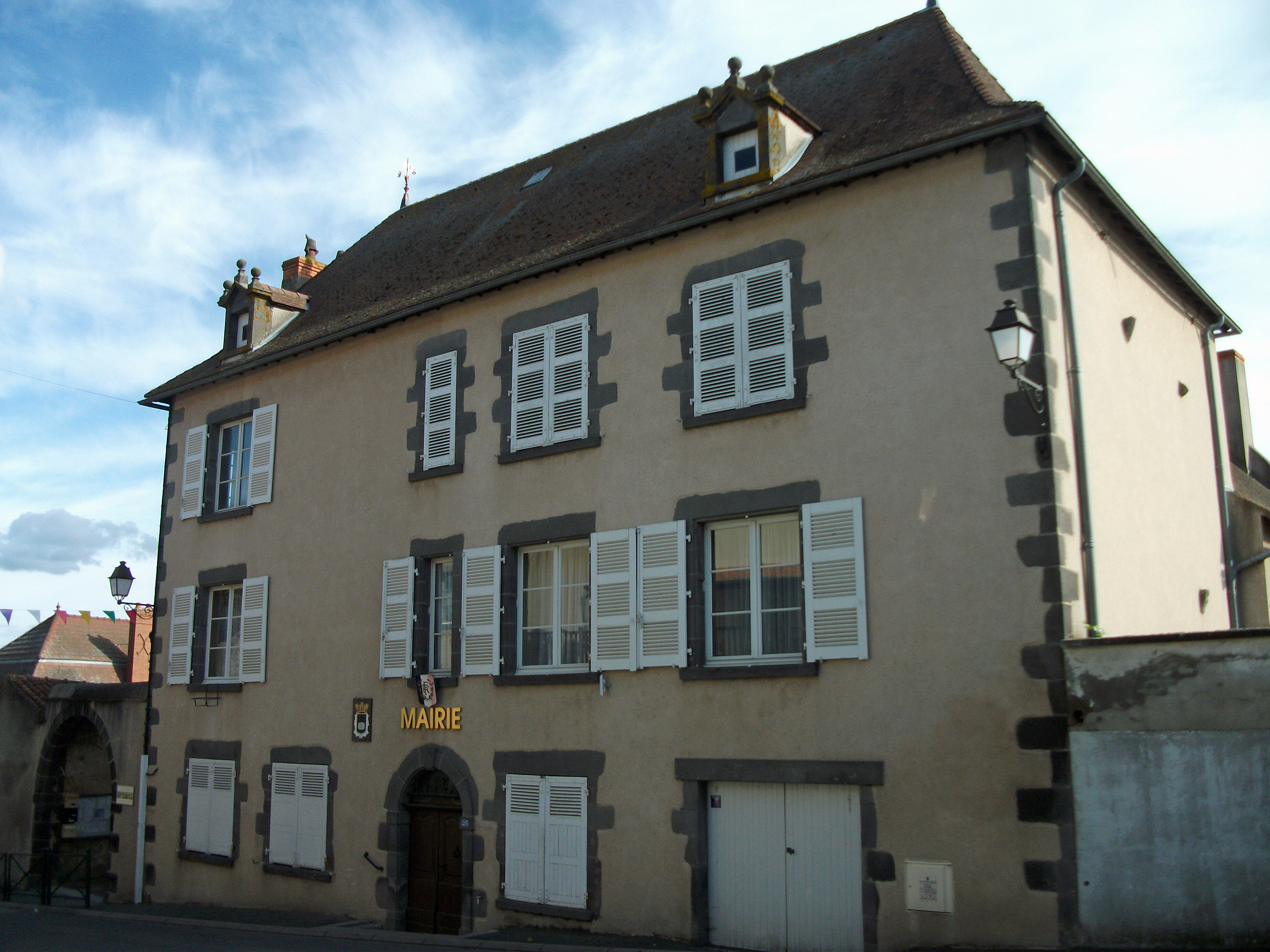
- Town hall

- Coat of arms
- Location of Artonne
- Location within France Location within Auvergne-Rhône-Alpes
- Coordinates: 46°00′15″N 3°08′41″E
- Country: France
- Region: Auvergne-Rhône-Alpes
- Department: Puy-de-Dôme
- Arrondissement: Riom
- Canton: Aigueperse
- Intercommunality: CC Plaine Limagne

Government
  - Mayor (2026–32): Stéphane Houssier
- Area^{1}: 17.48 km^{2} (6.75 sq mi)
- Elevation: 348 m (1,142 ft)
- Highest elevation: 532 m (1,745 ft)
- Lowest elevation: 334 m (1,096 ft)
- Population (2023): 912
  - Density: 52.2/km^{2} (135/sq mi)
- Time zone: UTC+01:00 (CET)
  - Summer (DST): UTC+02:00 (CEST)
- INSEE/Postal code: 63012 /63460
- ^{1} French Land Register data, which excludes lakes, ponds, glaciers > 1 km^{2} (0.386 sq mi or 247 acres) and river estuaries.

Artonne (French pronunciation: [aʁtɔn]; Occitan: Artona) is a commune in the Puy-de-Dôme department in Auvergne-Rhône-Alpes in central France.

== Population ==
Historical population
Year	Pop.	±% p.a.
1968	714	—
1975	685	−0.59%
1982	753	+1.36%
1990	779	+0.43%
1999	762	−0.24%
2007	772	+0.16%
2012	819	+1.19%
2017	898	+1.86%
2023	912	+0.26%
Source: INSEE

== See also ==
- Communes of the Puy-de-Dôme department
