= Communauté d'agglomération Riom Limagne et Volcans =

Riom Limagne et Volcans
- Communauté d'agglomération
- Interactive map of Riom Limagne et Volcans
- Coordinates: 45°53′N 03°07′E
- Country: France
- Region: Auvergne-Rhône-Alpes
- Department: Puy-de-Dôme
- No. of communes: {{{nbcomm}}}
- Established: 2017
- Area: 401.8 km^{2} (155.1 sq mi)
- Population (2019): 67,503
  - Density: 168.0/km^{2} (435.1/sq mi)
- Website: www.rlv.eu

Communauté d'agglomération Riom Limagne et Volcans is the communauté d'agglomération, an intercommunal structure, centred on the town of Riom. It is located in the Puy-de-Dôme department, in the Auvergne-Rhône-Alpes region, central France. Created in 2017, its seat is in Riom. Its area is 401.8 km^{2}. Its population was 67,503 in 2019, of which 19,004 in Riom proper.

== Composition ==
The communauté d'agglomération consists of the following 31 communes:

1. Chambaron-sur-Morge
2. Chanat-la-Mouteyre
3. Chappes
4. Charbonnières-les-Varennes
5. Châtel-Guyon
6. Chavaroux
7. Le Cheix-sur-Morge
8. Clerlande
9. Ennezat
10. Entraigues
11. Enval
12. Lussat
13. Malauzat
14. Malintrat
15. Marsat
16. Les Martres-d'Artière
17. Martres-sur-Morge
18. Ménétrol
19. Mozac
20. Pessat-Villeneuve
21. Pulvérières
22. Riom
23. Saint-Beauzire
24. Saint-Bonnet-près-Riom
25. Saint-Ignat
26. Saint-Laure
27. Saint-Ours
28. Sayat
29. Surat
30. Varennes-sur-Morge
31. Volvic
