= Le Cheix-sur-Morge =

- Commune
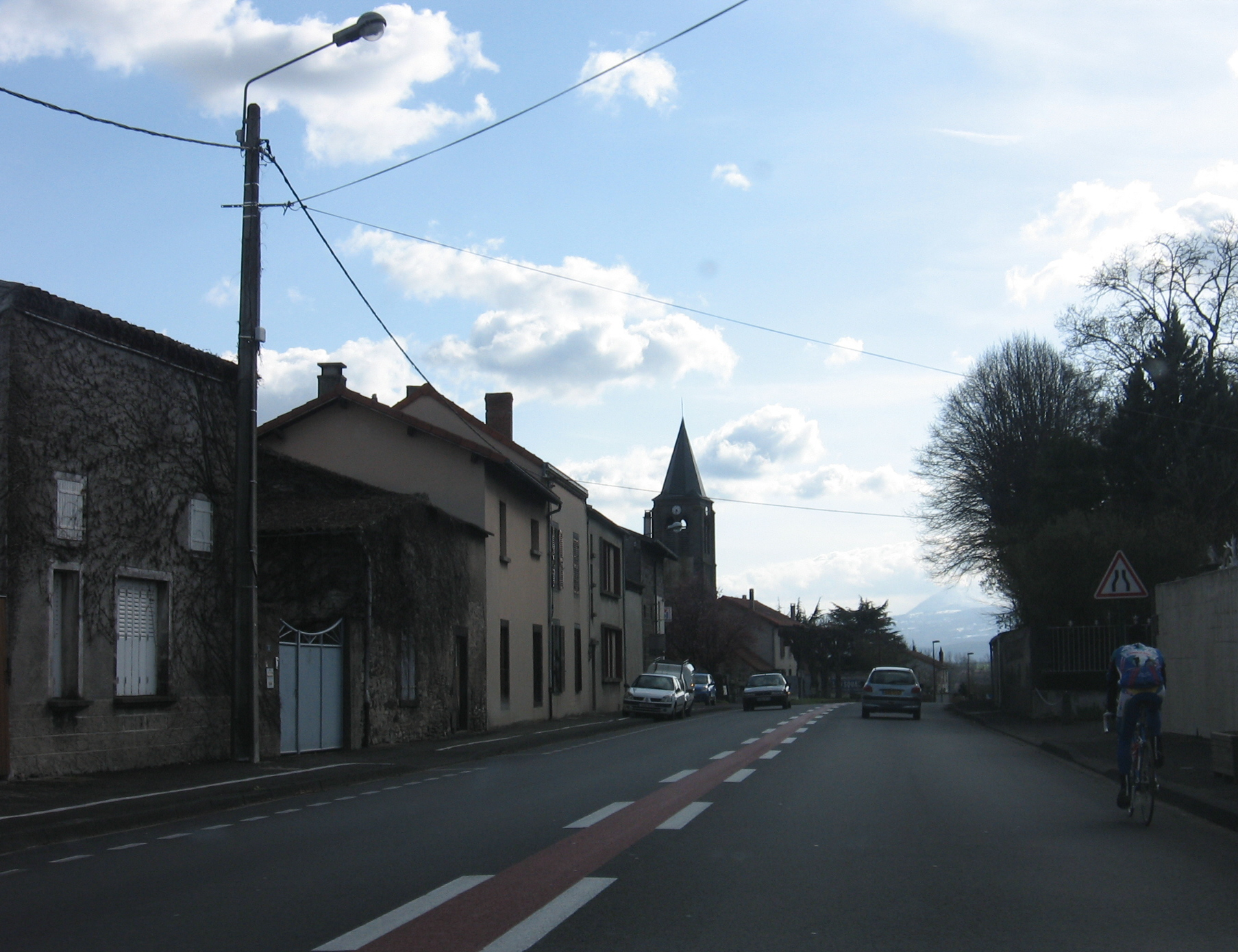
- The village of Le Cheix

- Coat of arms
- Location of Le Cheix-sur-Morge
- Location within France Location within Auvergne-Rhône-Alpes
- Coordinates: 45°57′33″N 3°10′27″E
- Country: France
- Region: Auvergne-Rhône-Alpes
- Department: Puy-de-Dôme
- Arrondissement: Riom
- Canton: Riom
- Intercommunality: CA Riom Limagne et Volcans

Government
  - Mayor (2026–32): Bertrand Bigay
- Area^{1}: 4.63 km^{2} (1.79 sq mi)
- Elevation: 338 m (1,109 ft)
- Highest elevation: 350 m (1,150 ft)
- Lowest elevation: 314 m (1,030 ft)
- Population (2023): 695
  - Density: 150/km^{2} (389/sq mi)
- Time zone: UTC+01:00 (CET)
  - Summer (DST): UTC+02:00 (CEST)
- INSEE/Postal code: 63108 /63200
- ^{1} French Land Register data, which excludes lakes, ponds, glaciers > 1 km^{2} (0.386 sq mi or 247 acres) and river estuaries.

Le Cheix-sur-Morge (French pronunciation: [lə ʃɛ], before 2025: Le Cheix) is a commune in the Puy-de-Dôme department in Auvergne-Rhône-Alpes in central France.

== See also ==
- Communes of the Puy-de-Dôme department
