= Sardon =

- Commune
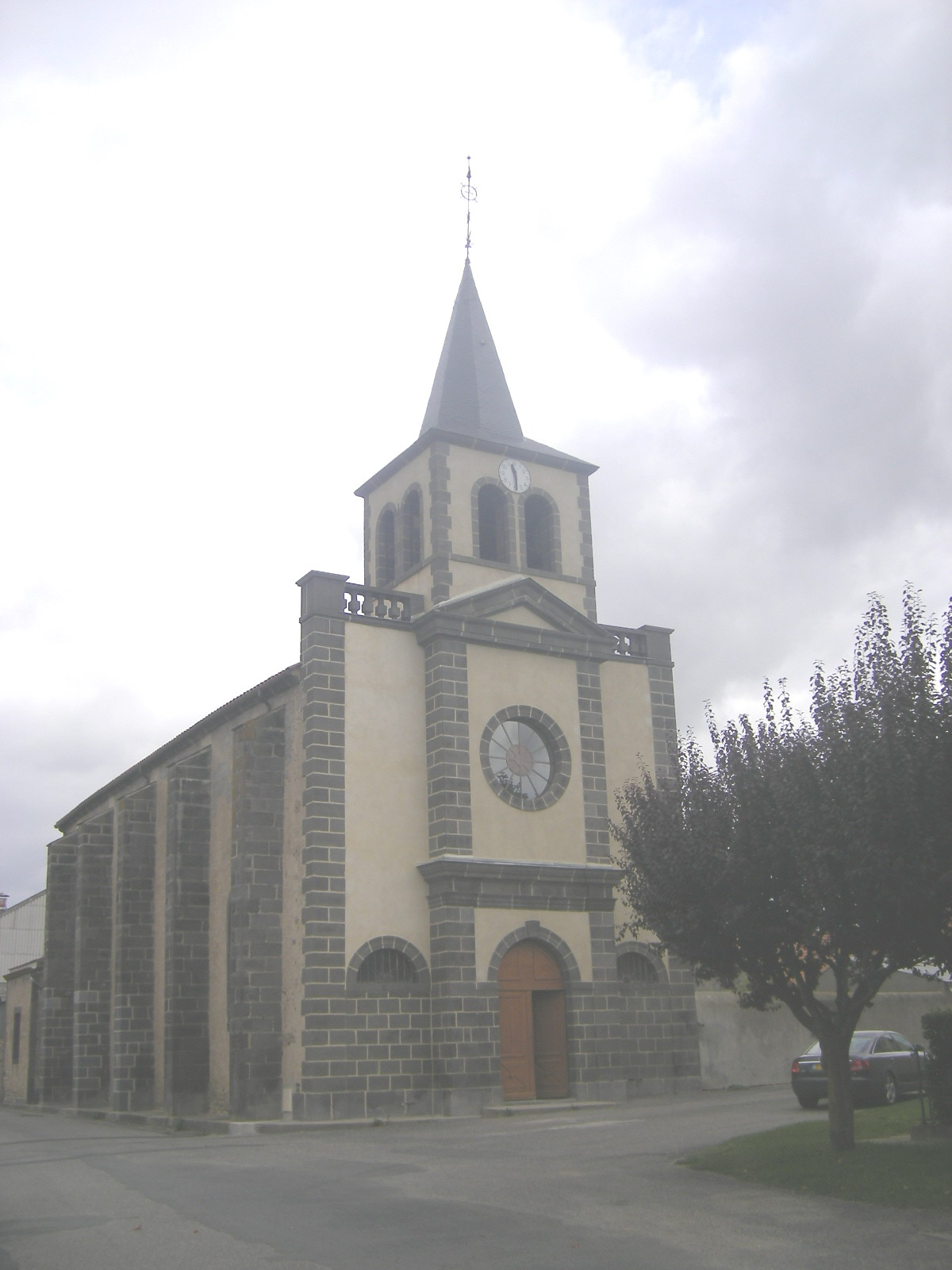
- The church in Sardon
- Location of Sardon
- Location within France Location within Auvergne-Rhône-Alpes
- Coordinates: 45°57′49″N 3°13′19″E
- Country: France
- Region: Auvergne-Rhône-Alpes
- Department: Puy-de-Dôme
- Arrondissement: Riom
- Canton: Aigueperse
- Intercommunality: CC Plaine Limagne

Government
  - Mayor (2020–2026): Guy Tixier
- Area^{1}: 8.41 km^{2} (3.25 sq mi)
- Elevation: 341 m (1,119 ft)
- Highest elevation: 355 m (1,165 ft)
- Lowest elevation: 313 m (1,027 ft)
- Population (2023): 303
  - Density: 36.0/km^{2} (93.3/sq mi)
- Time zone: UTC+01:00 (CET)
  - Summer (DST): UTC+02:00 (CEST)
- INSEE/Postal code: 63406 /63260
- ^{1} French Land Register data, which excludes lakes, ponds, glaciers > 1 km^{2} (0.386 sq mi or 247 acres) and river estuaries.

Sardon (French pronunciation: [saʁdɔ̃]) is a commune in the Puy-de-Dôme department in Auvergne in central France.

== See also ==
- Communes of the Puy-de-Dôme department
