= Saint-Genès-du-Retz =

- Commune
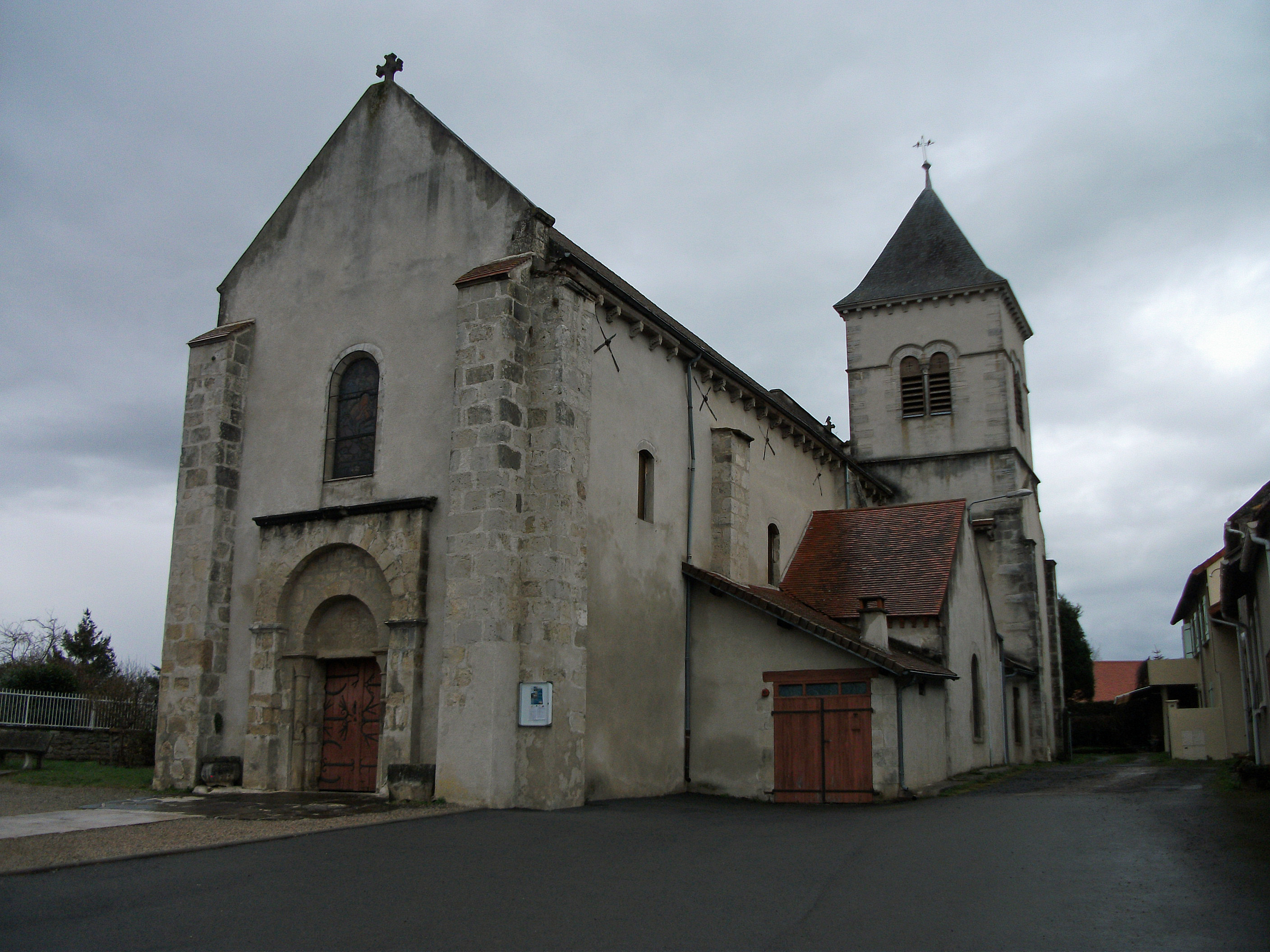
- The church in Saint-Genès-du-Retz

- Coat of arms
- Location of Saint-Genès-du-Retz
- Location within France Location within Auvergne-Rhône-Alpes
- Coordinates: 46°04′N 3°13′E
- Country: France
- Region: Auvergne-Rhône-Alpes
- Department: Puy-de-Dôme
- Arrondissement: Riom
- Canton: Aigueperse
- Intercommunality: Plaine Limagne

Government
  - Mayor (2026–32): Eric Rousseau
- Area^{1}: 8.24 km^{2} (3.18 sq mi)
- Elevation: 357 m (1,171 ft)
- Highest elevation: 454 m (1,490 ft)
- Lowest elevation: 338 m (1,109 ft)
- Population (2023): 471
  - Density: 57.2/km^{2} (148/sq mi)
- Demonym: Saint-Genestois
- Time zone: UTC+01:00 (CET)
  - Summer (DST): UTC+02:00 (CEST)
- INSEE/Postal code: 63347 /63260
- Website: mairie-saintgenesduretz.fr (in French)
- ^{1} French Land Register data, which excludes lakes, ponds, glaciers > 1 km^{2} (0.386 sq mi or 247 acres) and river estuaries.

Saint-Genès-du-Retz (French pronunciation: [sɛ̃ ʒənɛ dy ʁɛts]; Occitan: Sent Genèst de Retz) is a commune in the Puy-de-Dôme department in Auvergne-Rhône-Alpes in central France.

Its inhabitants are called Saint-Genestois.

== Geography ==
=== Location ===
Saint-Genès-du-Retz is located in the north of the Puy-de-Dôme department.

Seven municipalities are bordering, including four in the neighboring department of Allier.

=== Transport ===
The commune is located between Gannat and Aigueperse, on the departmental axis RD 2009 (former Route nationale 9). This road separates the main village of the commune and Jayet, accessible by the departmental road 438, and continuing towards the village of Fusse, becoming the RD 274 at the entrance to the department of Allier and the commune of Charmes.

Further south, the departmental road 93 linking Effiat and Vensat also serves the commune.

The railway line from Saint-Germain-des-Fossés to Nîmes-Courbessac passes through the commune. The TER Auvergne trains connecting Montluçon or Gannat to Clermont-Ferrand pass through it. The nearest stations are in Gannat and Aigueperse.

== See also ==
- Communes of the Puy-de-Dôme department
