= Hôtel Cote-Blatin =

Coordinates: 45.7770°N 3.0904°E

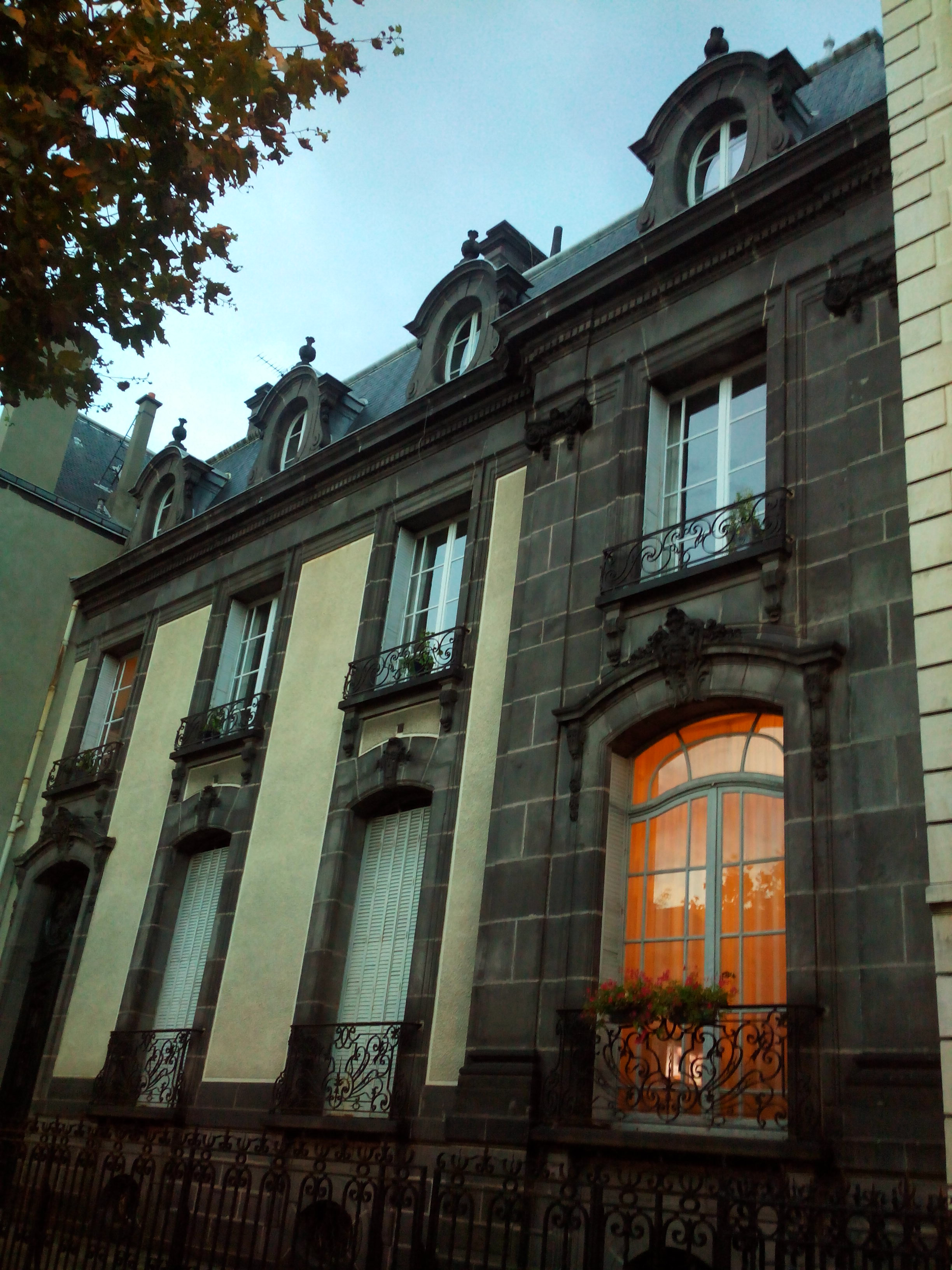
- The Hôtel Cote-Blatin in 2013
- Interactive map of the Hôtel Cote-Blatin area

General information
- Type: Hôtel particulier
- Location: 9 cours Sablon, Clermont-Ferrand, France
- Completed: 1897

Design and construction
- Architect: Émile Camut

The Hôtel Cote-Blatin is a historic hôtel particulier in Clermont-Ferrand, France. It was built in 1897 for Joseph Cote, a physician. It was designed by architect Émile Camut. It has been listed as an official historic monument since 2010.
