= Saint-Bonnet-près-Riom =

- Commune
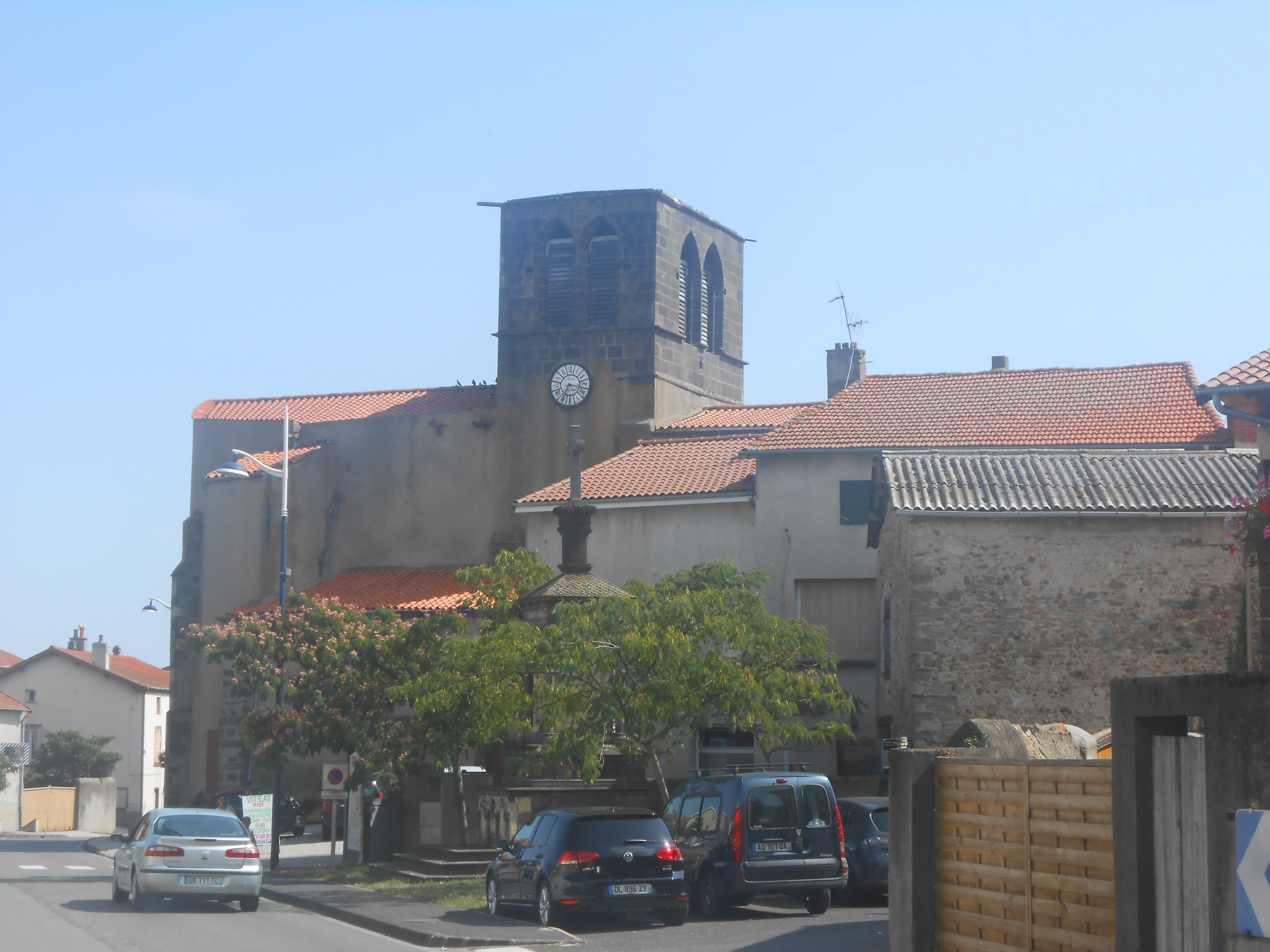
- The church and surroundings in Saint-Bonnet-près-Riom

- Coat of arms
- Location of Saint-Bonnet-près-Riom
- Location within France Location within Auvergne-Rhône-Alpes
- Coordinates: 45°55′48″N 3°06′47″E
- Country: France
- Region: Auvergne-Rhône-Alpes
- Department: Puy-de-Dôme
- Arrondissement: Riom
- Canton: Riom
- Intercommunality: CA Riom Limagne et Volcans

Government
  - Mayor (2020–2026): Denis Rougeyron
- Area^{1}: 7.03 km^{2} (2.71 sq mi)
- Elevation: 437 m (1,434 ft)
- Highest elevation: 400 m (1,300 ft)
- Lowest elevation: 339 m (1,112 ft)
- Population (2023): 2,110
  - Density: 300/km^{2} (777/sq mi)
- Time zone: UTC+01:00 (CET)
  - Summer (DST): UTC+02:00 (CEST)
- INSEE/Postal code: 63327 /63200
- ^{1} French Land Register data, which excludes lakes, ponds, glaciers > 1 km^{2} (0.386 sq mi or 247 acres) and river estuaries.

Saint-Bonnet-près-Riom (French pronunciation: [sɛ̃ bɔnɛ pʁɛ ʁjɔ̃], literally Saint-Bonnet near Riom; Auvergnat: Sant Bonet de Rioms) is a commune in the Puy-de-Dôme department in Auvergne in central France.

== Population ==
Historical population
Year	Pop.	±% p.a.
1968	1,083	—
1975	1,037	−0.62%
1982	1,063	+0.35%
1990	1,215	+1.68%
1999	1,487	+2.27%
2007	1,809	+2.48%
2012	2,056	+2.59%
2017	2,114	+0.56%
2023	2,110	−0.03%
Source: INSEE

== See also ==
- Communes of the Puy-de-Dôme department
