= Saint-Laure =

- Commune
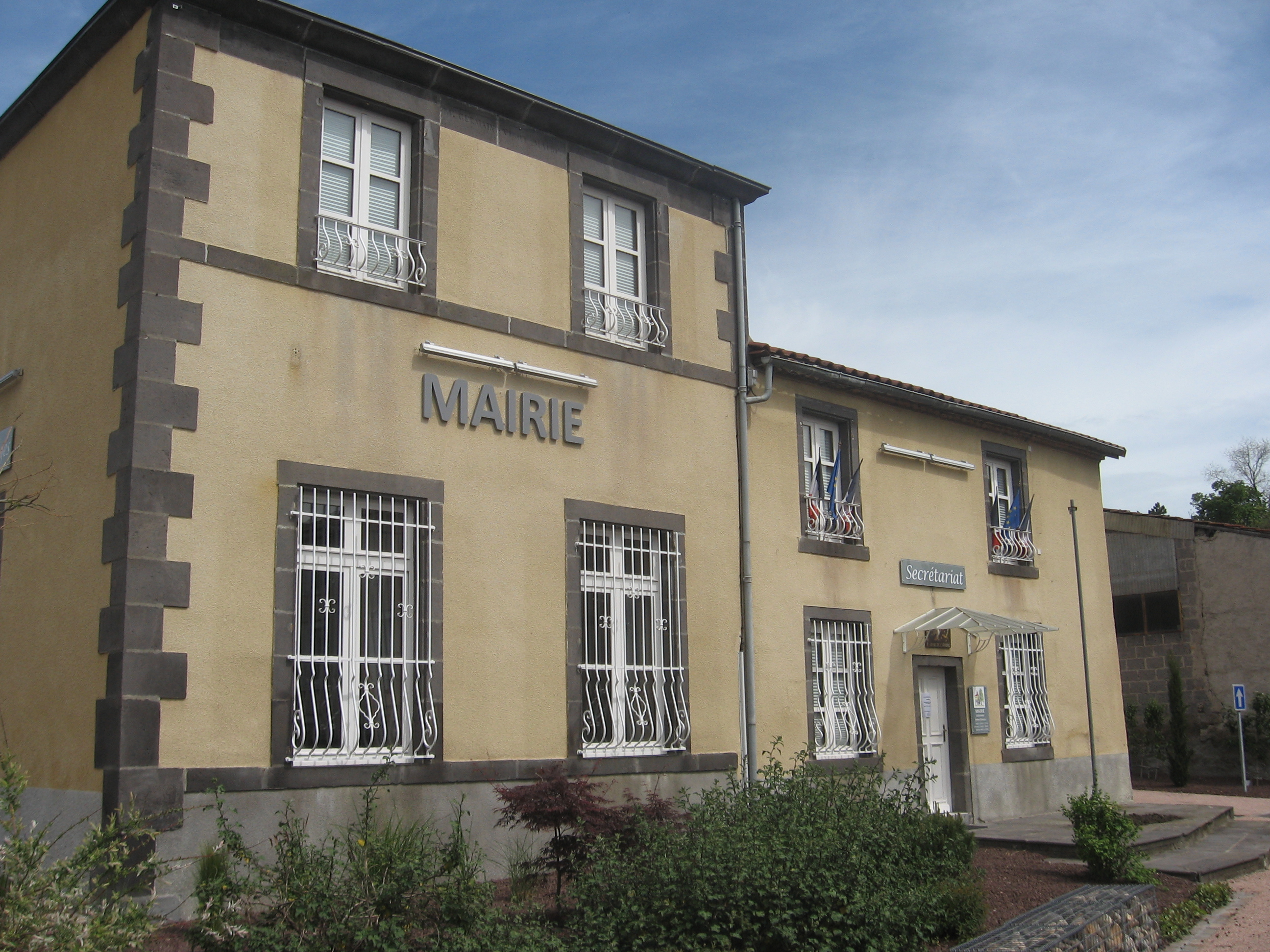
- The town hall in Saint-Laure

- Coat of arms
- Location of Saint-Laure
- Location within France Location within Auvergne-Rhône-Alpes
- Coordinates: 45°54′07″N 3°17′31″E
- Country: France
- Region: Auvergne-Rhône-Alpes
- Department: Puy-de-Dôme
- Arrondissement: Riom
- Canton: Aigueperse
- Intercommunality: CA Riom Limagne et Volcans

Government
  - Mayor (2026–32): Grégory Villafranca
- Area^{1}: 6.89 km^{2} (2.66 sq mi)
- Elevation: 321 m (1,053 ft)
- Highest elevation: 331 m (1,086 ft)
- Lowest elevation: 290 m (950 ft)
- Population (2023): 716
  - Density: 104/km^{2} (269/sq mi)
- Time zone: UTC+01:00 (CET)
  - Summer (DST): UTC+02:00 (CEST)
- INSEE/Postal code: 63372 /63350
- ^{1} French Land Register data, which excludes lakes, ponds, glaciers > 1 km^{2} (0.386 sq mi or 247 acres) and river estuaries.

Saint-Laure (French pronunciation: [sɛ̃ loʁ]) is a commune in the Puy-de-Dôme department in Auvergne in central France.

== See also ==
- Communes of the Puy-de-Dôme department
