= Ennezat =

- Commune
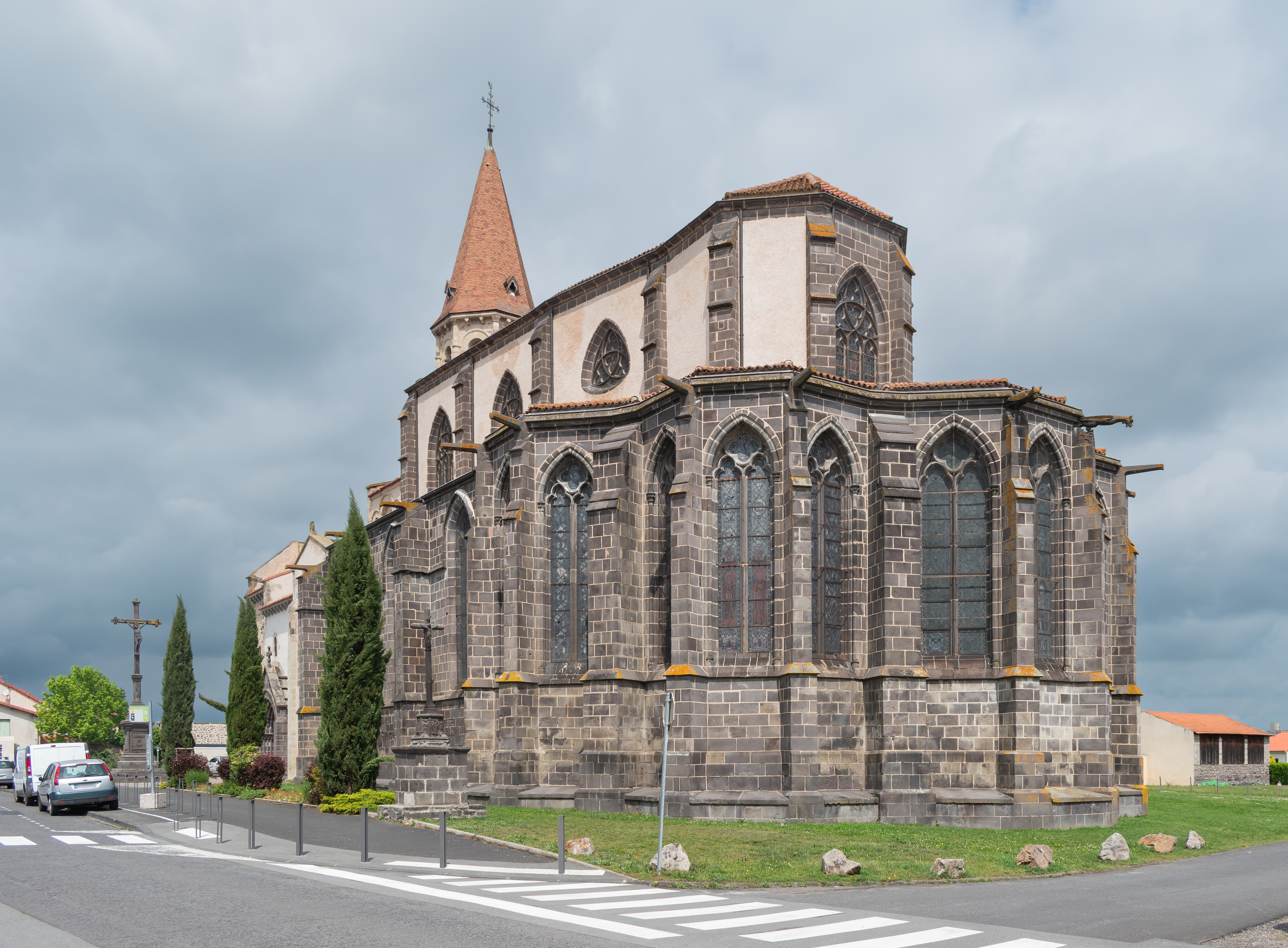
- The church in Ennezat

- Coat of arms
- Location of Ennezat
- Location within France Location within Auvergne-Rhône-Alpes
- Coordinates: 45°53′55″N 3°13′28″E
- Country: France
- Region: Auvergne-Rhône-Alpes
- Department: Puy-de-Dôme
- Arrondissement: Riom
- Canton: Aigueperse
- Intercommunality: CA Riom Limagne et Volcans

Government
  - Mayor (2026–32): Fabrice Magnet
- Area^{1}: 18.31 km^{2} (7.07 sq mi)
- Elevation: 321 m (1,053 ft)
- Highest elevation: 333 m (1,093 ft)
- Lowest elevation: 308 m (1,010 ft)
- Population (2023): 2,748
  - Density: 150.1/km^{2} (388.7/sq mi)
- Time zone: UTC+01:00 (CET)
  - Summer (DST): UTC+02:00 (CEST)
- INSEE/Postal code: 63148 /63720
- ^{1} French Land Register data, which excludes lakes, ponds, glaciers > 1 km^{2} (0.386 sq mi or 247 acres) and river estuaries.

Ennezat (French pronunciation: [ɛnza]; Occitan: Enesac) is a commune in the Puy-de-Dôme department in Auvergne in central France.

== History ==
The site was occupied early by the Gauls and Romans, who settled on hillocks (discovery of various debris, probably pre-Celtic).

It was an important transit point (due to its geographical location: Ennezat opens onto the Paris Basin), a crossroads between several regions (mountains, hillsides, cereal plains), like all the towns of the Limagne.

During the Middle Ages, the region was unsafe, but Ennezat did not experience any period of unrest, and in the 10th century, it was a fairly important town.

In 955, at the request of the Bishop of Clermont-Ferrand, the lords of Auvergne united to recognize the authority of the Count of Poitiers, and William III of Aquitaine had authority over the Auvergne region.

Around 1060, a chapter of twelve canons was founded by Duke William VI of Aquitaine in honor of Saints Victor and Couronne. The political situation at this time was complicated: the church, the castle, and the town belonged to the Count of Auvergne. But a second town was created nearby and called "Villeneuve." It was built on a geometric plan. The space between the two towns (Ennezat-le-Chastel and Ennezat-Villeneuve) remained unoccupied until the 19th century.

Although the town was divided into two villages, it had a common parish but no administration. Its economy was good: two fairs have existed since 1341, and two more were established there in 1556.

In 1588, Ennezat became one of the treize bonnes villes d'Auvergne (thirteen good towns of Auvergne), which had supported Charles VII during the Praguerie revolt of 1440

The lordship of Ennezat was abolished with the Revolution in 1789.

In the 19th and 20th centuries, beet cultivation developed, but the town did not prosper.

== Population ==
Historical population
Year	Pop.	±% p.a.
1968	913	—
1975	1,312	+5.32%
1982	1,729	+4.02%
1990	1,915	+1.29%
1999	2,044	+0.73%
2007	2,266	+1.30%
2012	2,424	+1.36%
2017	2,484	+0.49%
2023	2,748	+1.70%
Source: INSEE

== See also ==
- Communes of the Puy-de-Dôme department
