= Thuret, Puy-de-Dôme =

Thuret
- Commune
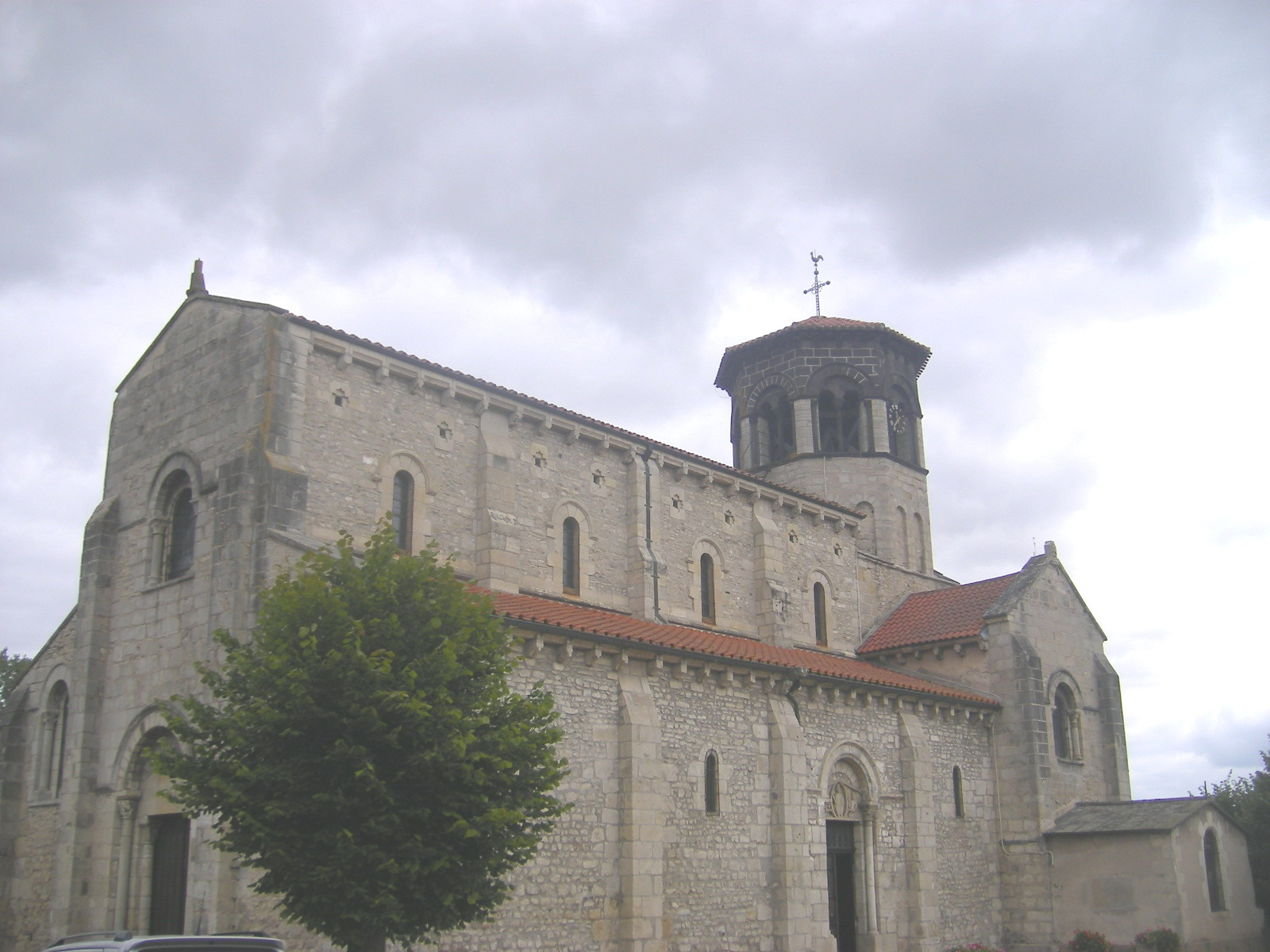
- The church in Thuret

- Coat of arms
- Location of Thuret
- Location within France Location within Auvergne-Rhône-Alpes
- Coordinates: 45°58′08″N 3°15′32″E
- Country: France
- Region: Auvergne-Rhône-Alpes
- Department: Puy-de-Dôme
- Arrondissement: Riom
- Canton: Aigueperse

Government
  - Mayor (2026–32): Marc Concu
- Area^{1}: 16.66 km^{2} (6.43 sq mi)
- Elevation: 320 m (1,050 ft)
- Highest elevation: 356 m (1,168 ft)
- Lowest elevation: 304 m (997 ft)
- Population (2023): 911
  - Density: 54.7/km^{2} (142/sq mi)
- Time zone: UTC+01:00 (CET)
  - Summer (DST): UTC+02:00 (CEST)
- INSEE/Postal code: 63432 /63260
- ^{1} French Land Register data, which excludes lakes, ponds, glaciers > 1 km^{2} (0.386 sq mi or 247 acres) and river estuaries.

Thuret (French pronunciation: [tyʁɛ]) is a commune in the Puy-de-Dôme department in Auvergne in central France.

== See also ==
- Château de la Canière
- Communes of the Puy-de-Dôme department
