= Chappes, Puy-de-Dôme =

Chappes
- Commune
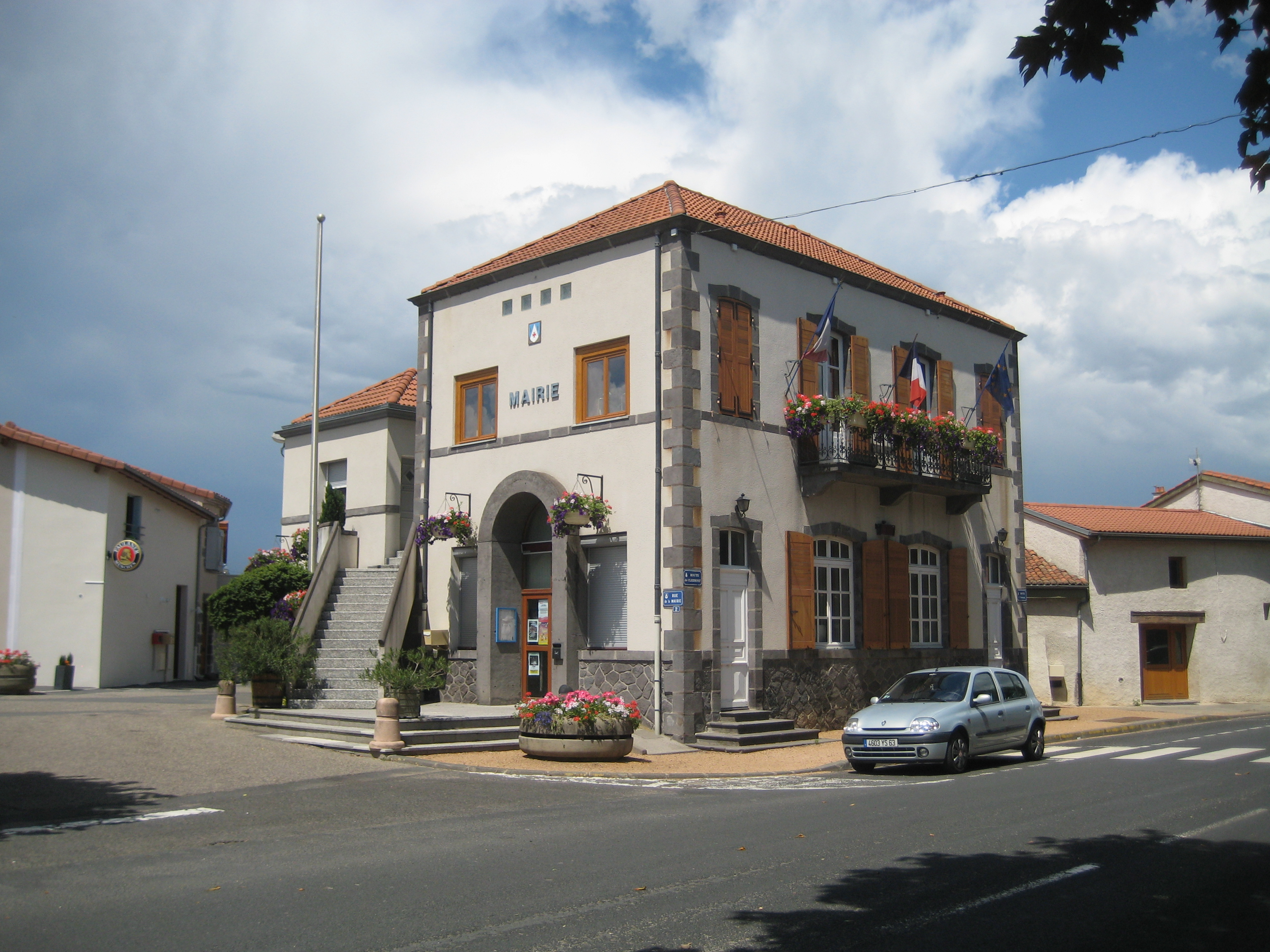
- Town hall

- Coat of arms
- Location of Chappes
- Location within France Location within Auvergne-Rhône-Alpes
- Coordinates: 45°52′10″N 3°13′18″E
- Country: France
- Region: Auvergne-Rhône-Alpes
- Department: Puy-de-Dôme
- Arrondissement: Riom
- Canton: Aigueperse
- Intercommunality: CA Riom Limagne et Volcans

Government
  - Mayor (2026–32): Patrice Gauthier
- Area^{1}: 10.21 km^{2} (3.94 sq mi)
- Elevation: 314 m (1,030 ft)
- Highest elevation: 333 m (1,093 ft)
- Lowest elevation: 307 m (1,007 ft)
- Population (2023): 1,607
  - Density: 157.4/km^{2} (407.7/sq mi)
- Time zone: UTC+01:00 (CET)
  - Summer (DST): UTC+02:00 (CEST)
- INSEE/Postal code: 63089 /63720
- ^{1} French Land Register data, which excludes lakes, ponds, glaciers > 1 km^{2} (0.386 sq mi or 247 acres) and river estuaries.

Chappes (French pronunciation: [ʃap]; Occitan: Chapas) is a commune in the Puy-de-Dôme department in Auvergne-Rhône-Alpes in central France. It is in the canton of Aigueperse.

== See also ==
- Communes of the Puy-de-Dôme department
