= Canton of Aigueperse =

Coordinates: 46.02°N 3.20°E

The canton of Aigueperse is an administrative division of the Puy-de-Dôme department, central France. Its borders were modified at the French canton reorganisation which came into effect in March 2015. Its seat is in Aigueperse.

It consists of the following communes:

1. Aigueperse
2. Artonne
3. Aubiat
4. Bussières-et-Pruns
5. Chappes
6. Chaptuzat
7. Chavaroux
8. Clerlande
9. Effiat
10. Ennezat
11. Entraigues
12. Lussat
13. Les Martres-d'Artière
14. Martres-sur-Morge
15. Montpensier
16. Saint-Agoulin
17. Saint-Genès-du-Retz
18. Saint-Ignat
19. Saint-Laure
20. Sardon
21. Surat
22. Thuret
23. Varennes-sur-Morge
24. Vensat
