= Varennes-sur-Morge =

- Commune
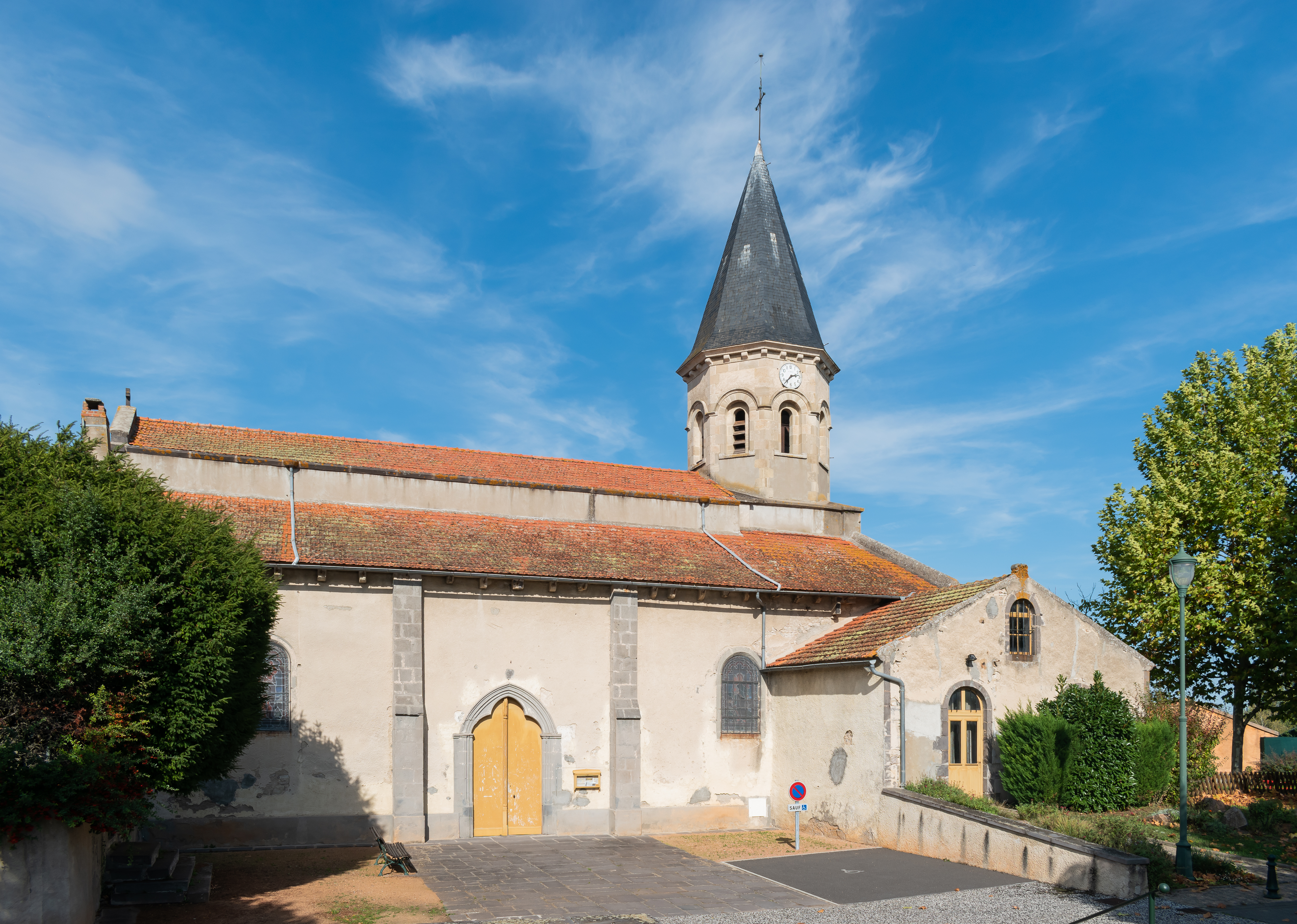
- The church in Varennes-sur-Morge
- Location of Varennes-sur-Morge
- Location within France Location within Auvergne-Rhône-Alpes
- Coordinates: 45°56′31″N 3°11′13″E
- Country: France
- Region: Auvergne-Rhône-Alpes
- Department: Puy-de-Dôme
- Arrondissement: Riom
- Canton: Aigueperse
- Intercommunality: CA Riom Limagne et Volcans

Government
  - Mayor (2020–2026): Didier Michel
- Area^{1}: 4.93 km^{2} (1.90 sq mi)
- Elevation: 325 m (1,066 ft)
- Highest elevation: 340 m (1,120 ft)
- Lowest elevation: 309 m (1,014 ft)
- Population (2023): 429
  - Density: 87.0/km^{2} (225/sq mi)
- Time zone: UTC+01:00 (CET)
  - Summer (DST): UTC+02:00 (CEST)
- INSEE/Postal code: 63443 /63720
- ^{1} French Land Register data, which excludes lakes, ponds, glaciers > 1 km^{2} (0.386 sq mi or 247 acres) and river estuaries.

Varennes-sur-Morge (French pronunciation: [vaʁɛn syʁ mɔʁʒ]; Occitan: Varenas de Morja) is a commune in the Puy-de-Dôme department in Auvergne in central France.

== See also ==
- Communes of the Puy-de-Dôme department
