= Clerlande =

- Commune
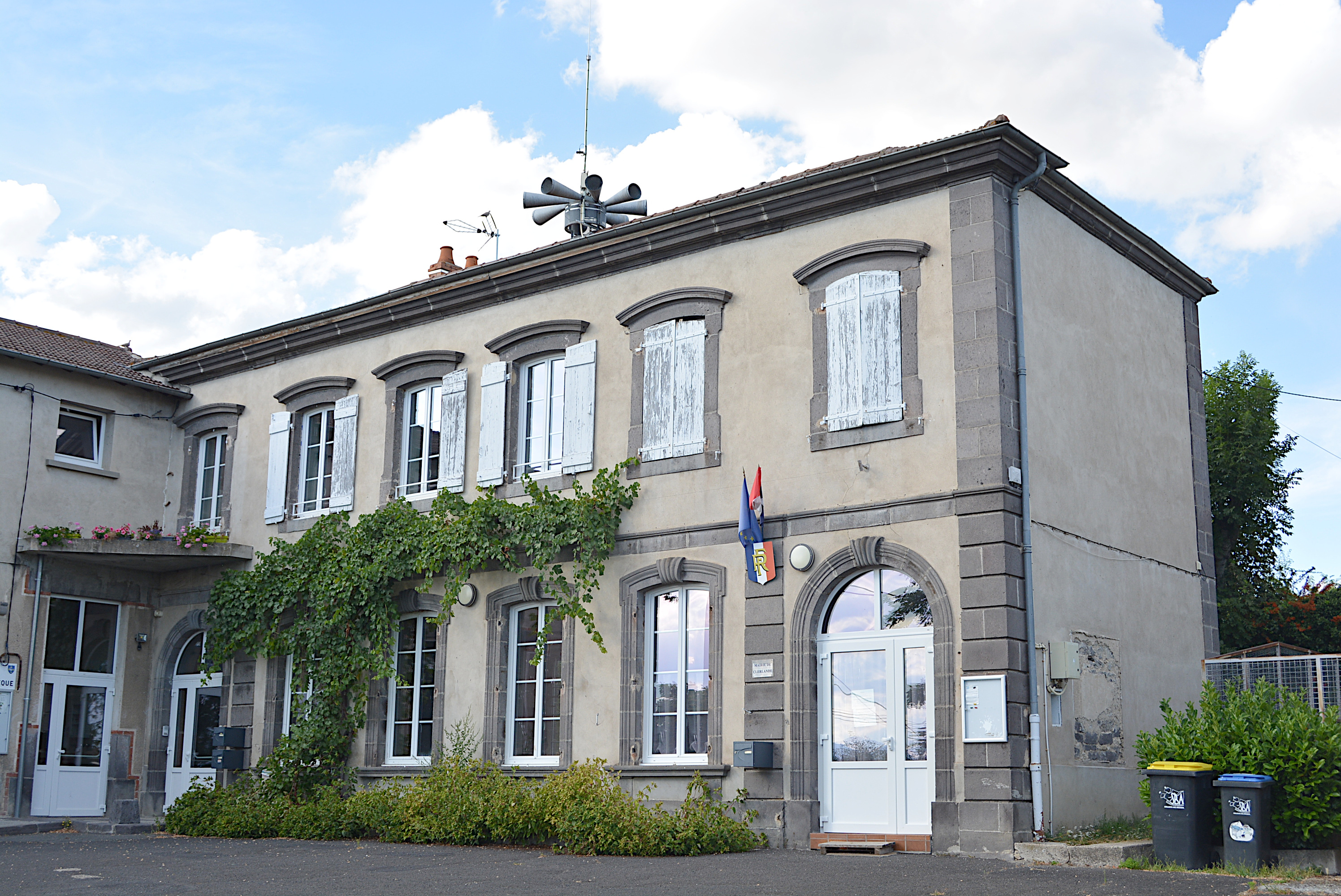
- Town hall

- Coat of arms
- Location of Clerlande
- Location within France Location within Auvergne-Rhône-Alpes
- Coordinates: 45°55′09″N 3°11′32″E
- Country: France
- Region: Auvergne-Rhône-Alpes
- Department: Puy-de-Dôme
- Arrondissement: Riom
- Canton: Aigueperse
- Intercommunality: CA Riom Limagne et Volcans

Government
  - Mayor (2026–32): Denis Dain
- Area^{1}: 8.31 km^{2} (3.21 sq mi)
- Elevation: 320 m (1,050 ft)
- Highest elevation: 335 m (1,099 ft)
- Lowest elevation: 313 m (1,027 ft)
- Population (2023): 637
  - Density: 76.7/km^{2} (199/sq mi)
- Time zone: UTC+01:00 (CET)
  - Summer (DST): UTC+02:00 (CEST)
- INSEE/Postal code: 63112 /63720
- Website: www.clerlande.fr
- ^{1} French Land Register data, which excludes lakes, ponds, glaciers > 1 km^{2} (0.386 sq mi or 247 acres) and river estuaries.

Clerlande (French pronunciation: [klɛʁlɑ̃d]; Occitan: Clarlemde) is a commune in the Puy-de-Dôme department in Auvergne-Rhône-Alpes in central France. It is in the canton of Aigueperse.

== See also ==
- Communes of the Puy-de-Dôme department
