= Chavaroux =

- Commune
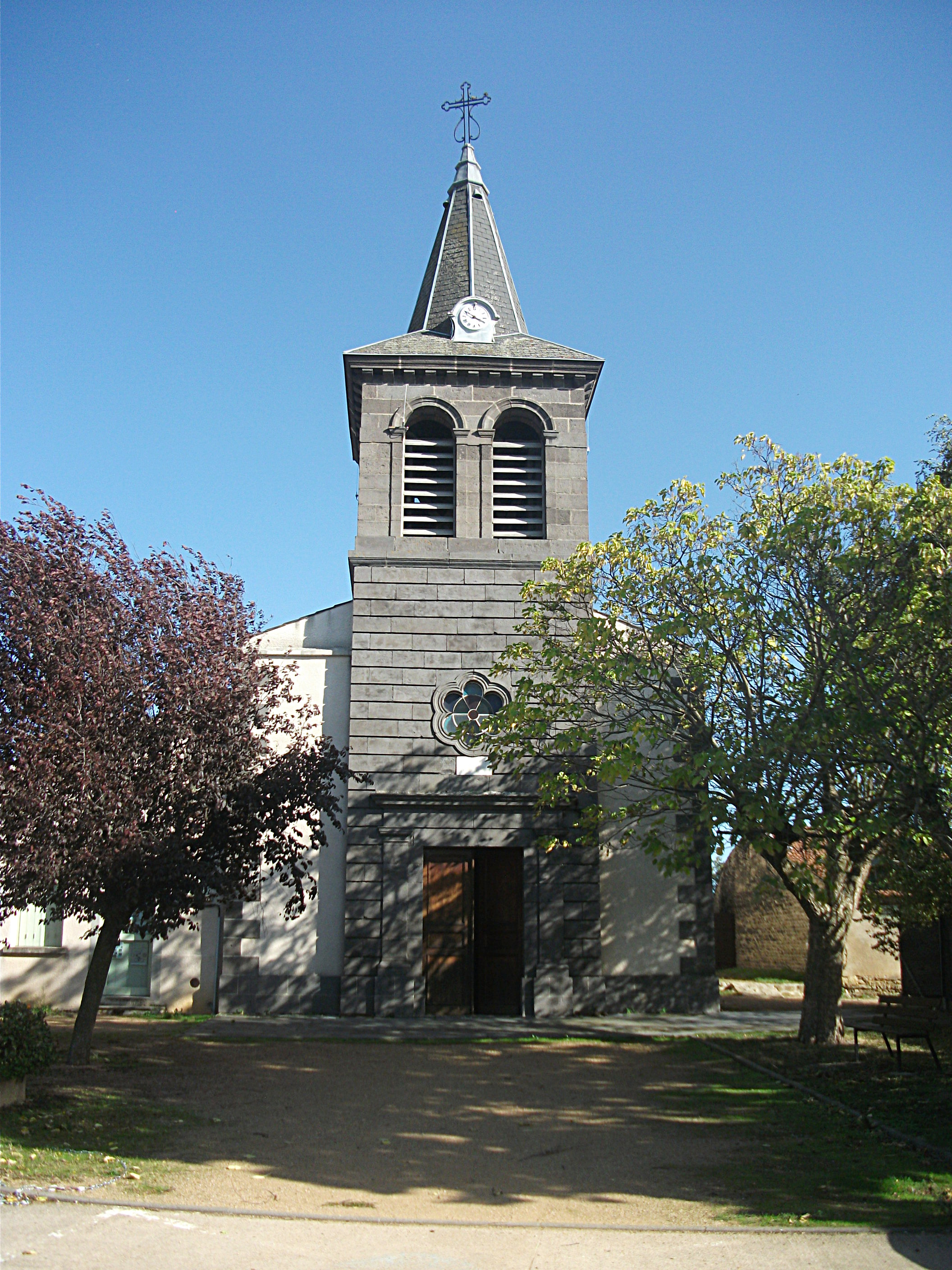
- Church
- Location of Chavaroux
- Location within France Location within Auvergne-Rhône-Alpes
- Coordinates: 45°51′05″N 3°15′37″E
- Country: France
- Region: Auvergne-Rhône-Alpes
- Department: Puy-de-Dôme
- Arrondissement: Riom
- Canton: Aigueperse
- Intercommunality: CA Riom Limagne et Volcans

Government
  - Mayor (2020–2026): José Belda
- Area^{1}: 3.98 km^{2} (1.54 sq mi)
- Elevation: 374 m (1,227 ft)
- Highest elevation: 366 m (1,201 ft)
- Lowest elevation: 323 m (1,060 ft)
- Population (2023): 529
  - Density: 133/km^{2} (344/sq mi)
- Time zone: UTC+01:00 (CET)
  - Summer (DST): UTC+02:00 (CEST)
- INSEE/Postal code: 63107 /63720
- ^{1} French Land Register data, which excludes lakes, ponds, glaciers > 1 km^{2} (0.386 sq mi or 247 acres) and river estuaries.

Chavaroux (French pronunciation: [ʃavaʁu]; Occitan: Chavarós) is a commune in the Puy-de-Dôme department in Auvergne-Rhône-Alpes in central France. It is in the canton of Aigueperse.

== See also ==
- Communes of the Puy-de-Dôme department
