= Surat, Puy-de-Dôme =

Surat
- Commune
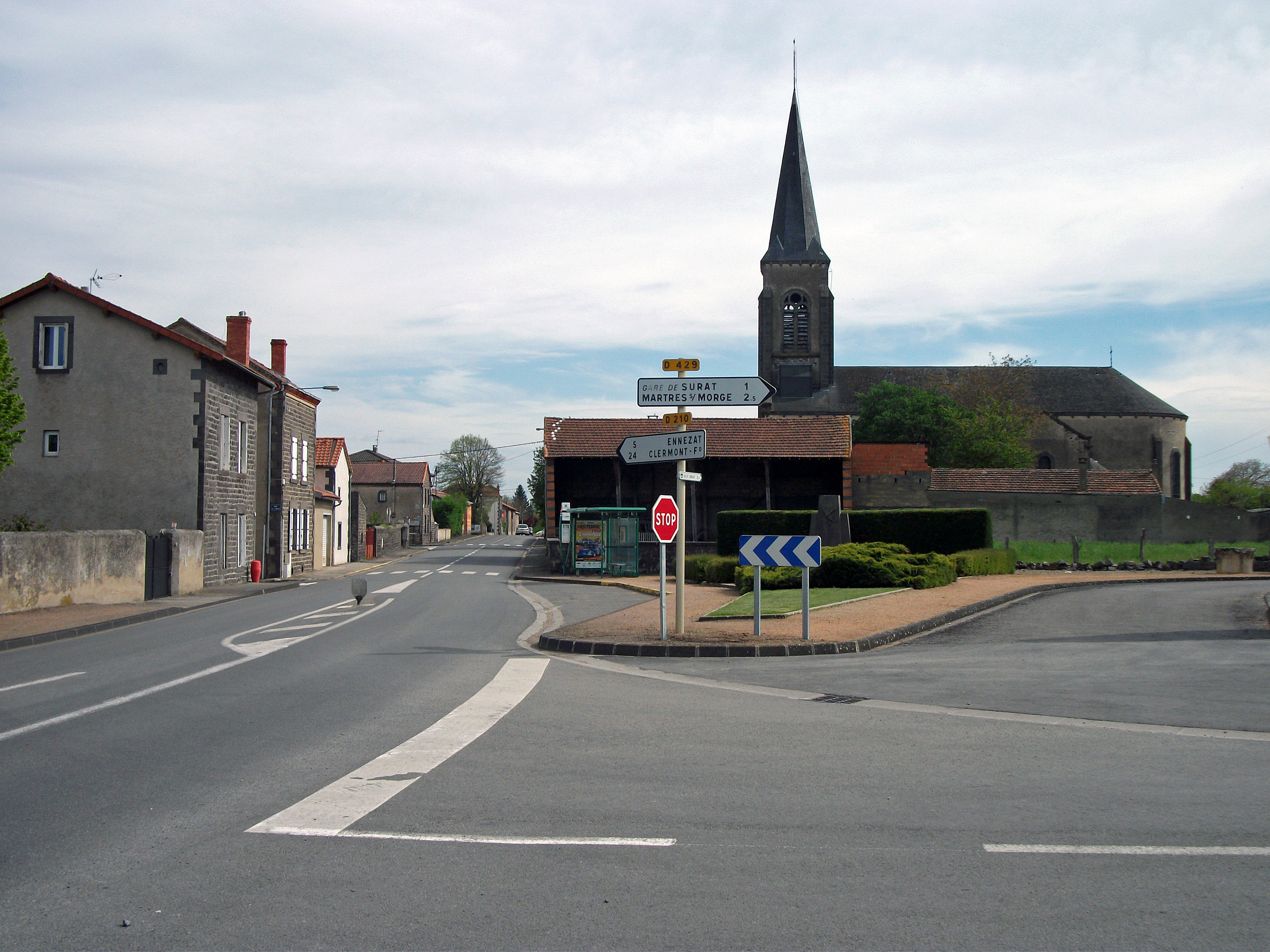
- The church and surroundings in Surat

- Coat of arms
- Location of Surat
- Location within France Location within Auvergne-Rhône-Alpes
- Coordinates: 45°56′18″N 3°15′19″E
- Country: France
- Region: Auvergne-Rhône-Alpes
- Department: Puy-de-Dôme
- Arrondissement: Riom
- Canton: Aigueperse
- Intercommunality: CA Riom Limagne et Volcans

Government
  - Mayor (2020–2026): Roland Grenet
- Area^{1}: 8.73 km^{2} (3.37 sq mi)
- Elevation: 315 m (1,033 ft)
- Highest elevation: 324 m (1,063 ft)
- Lowest elevation: 305 m (1,001 ft)
- Population (2023): 611
  - Density: 70.0/km^{2} (181/sq mi)
- Time zone: UTC+01:00 (CET)
  - Summer (DST): UTC+02:00 (CEST)
- INSEE/Postal code: 63424 /63720
- ^{1} French Land Register data, which excludes lakes, ponds, glaciers > 1 km^{2} (0.386 sq mi or 247 acres) and river estuaries.

Surat (French pronunciation: [syʁa]) is a commune in the Puy-de-Dôme department in Auvergne in central France.

== See also ==
- Communes of the Puy-de-Dôme department
