= Émile Camut =

French architect

- Born: February 12, 1849
- Died: August 4, 1905
- Occupation: Architect

Émile Camut (1849–1905) was a French architect. Some of the buildings he designed, like the Hôtel Côte-Blatin in Clermont-Ferrand, are listed as official historic monuments. He also redesigned the spa in Le Mont-Dore, another listed building, in 1887. By 1895, he designed the Protestant Temple in Mont Dore. With architect Georges Vimort, he designed the Casino Chardon in La Bourboule.

== See also ==
- Château de la Canière
