= Vensat =

- Commune
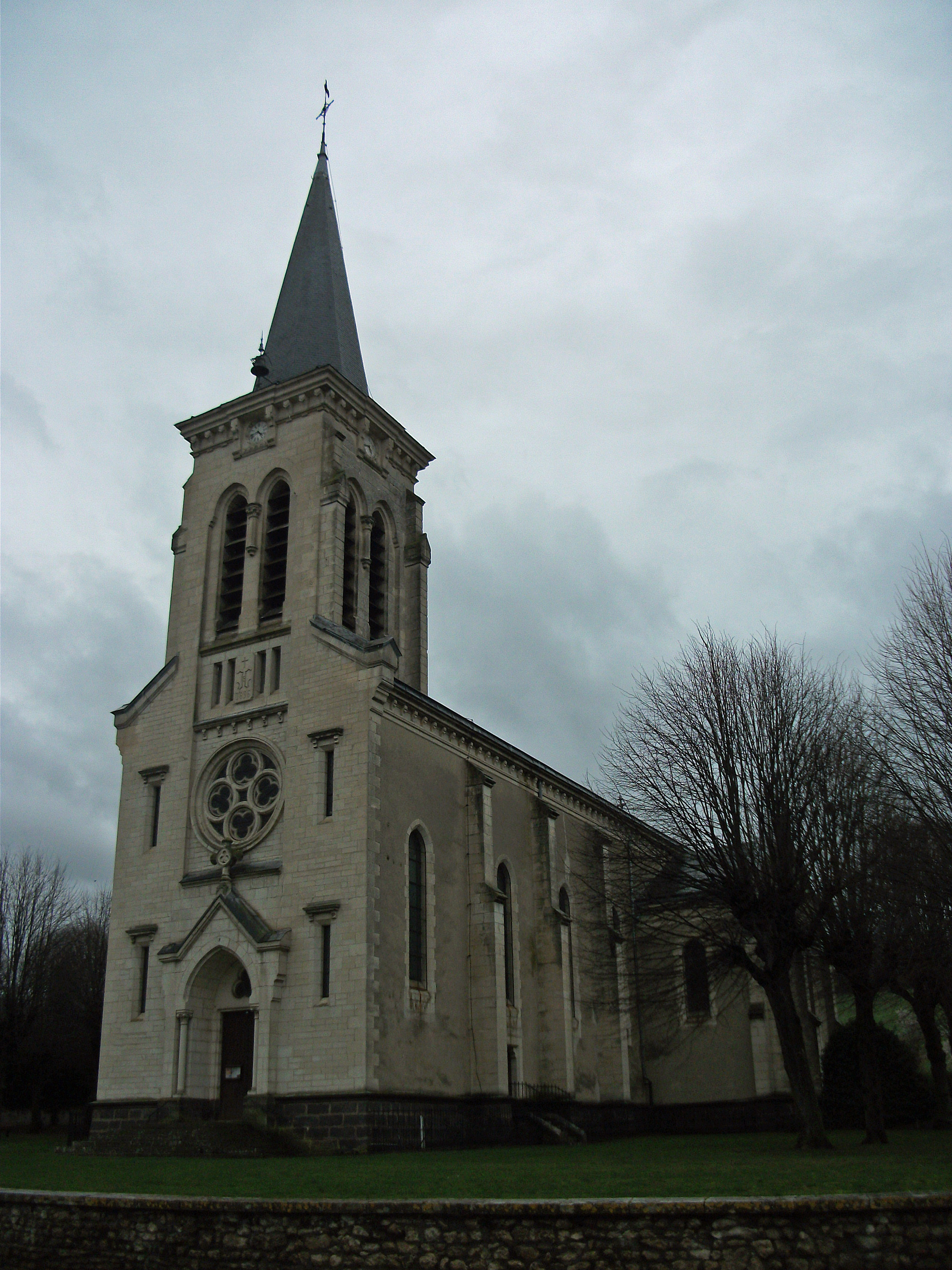
- The church in Vensat

- Coat of arms
- Location of Vensat
- Location within France Location within Auvergne-Rhône-Alpes
- Coordinates: 46°02′46″N 3°11′10″E
- Country: France
- Region: Auvergne-Rhône-Alpes
- Department: Puy-de-Dôme
- Arrondissement: Riom
- Canton: Aigueperse
- Intercommunality: CC Plaine Limagne

Government
  - Mayor (2026–32): Brigitte Billebaud
- Area^{1}: 16.11 km^{2} (6.22 sq mi)
- Elevation: 400 m (1,300 ft)
- Highest elevation: 572 m (1,877 ft)
- Lowest elevation: 350 m (1,150 ft)
- Population (2023): 569
  - Density: 35.3/km^{2} (91.5/sq mi)
- Time zone: UTC+01:00 (CET)
  - Summer (DST): UTC+02:00 (CEST)
- INSEE/Postal code: 63446 /63260
- ^{1} French Land Register data, which excludes lakes, ponds, glaciers > 1 km^{2} (0.386 sq mi or 247 acres) and river estuaries.

Vensat (French pronunciation: [vɑ̃sa]) is a commune in the Puy-de-Dôme department in Auvergne in central France.

== See also ==
- Communes of the Puy-de-Dôme department
