= Les Martres-d'Artière =

- Commune
- Coat of arms
- Location of Les Martres-d'Artière
- Location within France Location within Auvergne-Rhône-Alpes
- Coordinates: 45°50′09″N 3°15′43″E
- Country: France
- Region: Auvergne-Rhône-Alpes
- Department: Puy-de-Dôme
- Arrondissement: Riom
- Canton: Aigueperse
- Intercommunality: CA Riom Limagne et Volcans

Government
  - Mayor (2026–32): Vincent Raymond
- Area^{1}: 14.96 km^{2} (5.78 sq mi)
- Elevation: 320 m (1,050 ft)
- Highest elevation: 369 m (1,211 ft)
- Lowest elevation: 294 m (965 ft)
- Population (2023): 2,252
  - Density: 150.5/km^{2} (389.9/sq mi)
- Time zone: UTC+01:00 (CET)
  - Summer (DST): UTC+02:00 (CEST)
- INSEE/Postal code: 63213 /63430
- ^{1} French Land Register data, which excludes lakes, ponds, glaciers > 1 km^{2} (0.386 sq mi or 247 acres) and river estuaries.

Les Martres-d'Artière (French pronunciation: [le maʁtʁ daʁtjɛʁ]) is a commune in the Puy-de-Dôme department in Auvergne in central France.

== Population ==
Historical population
Year	Pop.	±% p.a.
1968	688	—
1975	806	+2.29%
1982	1,100	+4.54%
1990	1,206	+1.16%
1999	1,315	+0.97%
2007	1,823	+4.17%
2012	2,074	+2.61%
2017	2,156	+0.78%
2023	2,252	+0.73%
Source: INSEE

== See also ==
- Communes of the Puy-de-Dôme department
