= Bussières-et-Pruns =

- Commune
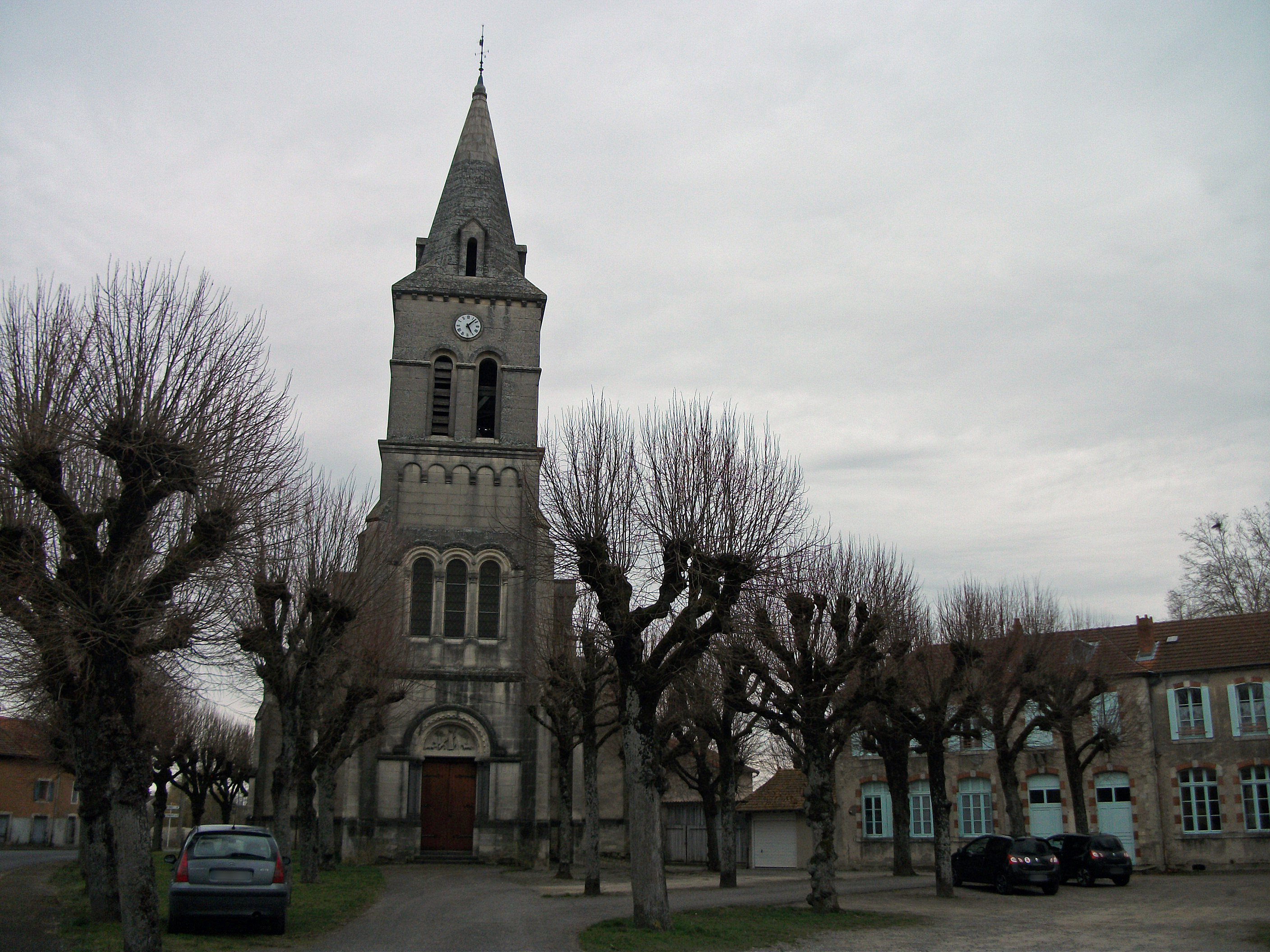
- Church

- Coat of arms
- Location of Bussières-et-Pruns
- Location within France Location within Auvergne-Rhône-Alpes
- Coordinates: 46°00′26″N 3°13′58″E
- Country: France
- Region: Auvergne-Rhône-Alpes
- Department: Puy-de-Dôme
- Arrondissement: Riom
- Canton: Aigueperse

Government
  - Mayor (2026–32): Loïc Chatard
- Area^{1}: 11.63 km^{2} (4.49 sq mi)
- Elevation: 353 m (1,158 ft)
- Highest elevation: 381 m (1,250 ft)
- Lowest elevation: 317 m (1,040 ft)
- Population (2023): 512
  - Density: 44.0/km^{2} (114/sq mi)
- Demonym(s): Bussiérois and Prunois
- Time zone: UTC+01:00 (CET)
  - Summer (DST): UTC+02:00 (CEST)
- INSEE/Postal code: 63061 /63260
- ^{1} French Land Register data, which excludes lakes, ponds, glaciers > 1 km^{2} (0.386 sq mi or 247 acres) and river estuaries.

Bussières-et-Pruns is a commune in the Puy-de-Dôme department in Auvergne-Rhône-Alpes in central France.

== Population ==
Its inhabitants are called Bussiérois and Prunois in French.

Historical population
Year	Pop.	±% p.a.
1968	382	—
1975	320	−2.50%
1982	333	+0.57%
1990	347	+0.52%
1999	306	−1.39%
2007	402	+3.47%
2012	425	+1.12%
2017	450	+1.15%
2023	512	+2.17%
Source: INSEE

== See also ==
- Communes of the Puy-de-Dôme department
