= Montpensier, Puy-de-Dôme =

Montpensier
- Commune
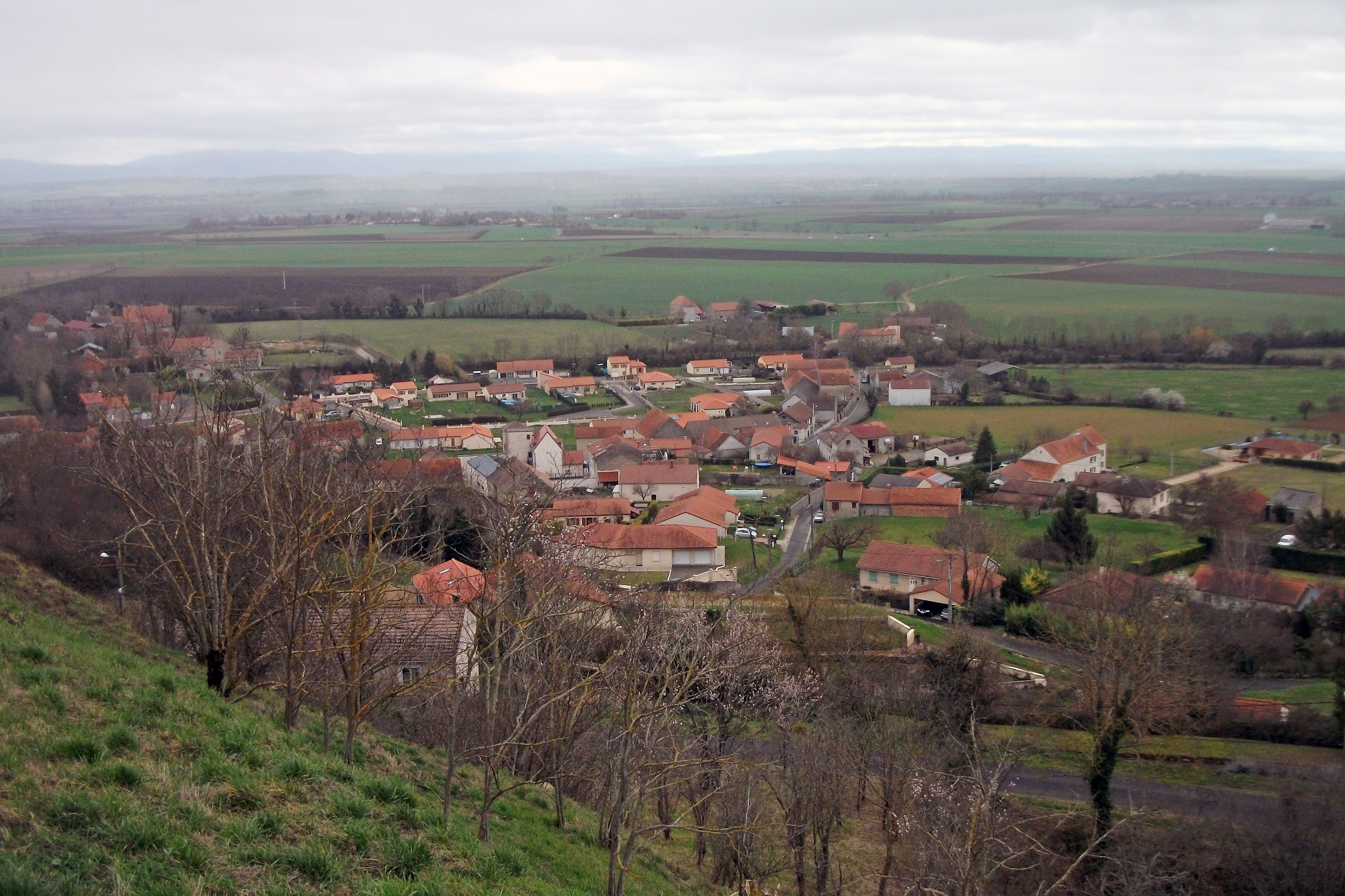
- A general view of Montpensier

- Coat of arms
- Location of Montpensier
- Location within France Location within Auvergne-Rhône-Alpes
- Coordinates: 46°02′10″N 3°13′12″E
- Country: France
- Region: Auvergne-Rhône-Alpes
- Department: Puy-de-Dôme
- Arrondissement: Riom
- Canton: Aigueperse
- Intercommunality: CC Plaine Limagne

Government
  - Mayor (2026–32): David Despax
- Area^{1}: 7.24 km^{2} (2.80 sq mi)
- Elevation: 362 m (1,188 ft)
- Highest elevation: 436 m (1,430 ft)
- Lowest elevation: 346 m (1,135 ft)
- Population (2023): 465
  - Density: 64.2/km^{2} (166/sq mi)
- Demonym(s): Montpensierois; Montpensiérois
- Time zone: UTC+01:00 (CET)
  - Summer (DST): UTC+02:00 (CEST)
- INSEE/Postal code: 63240 /63260
- ^{1} French Land Register data, which excludes lakes, ponds, glaciers > 1 km^{2} (0.386 sq mi or 247 acres) and river estuaries.

Montpensier (French pronunciation: [mɔ̃pɑ̃sje]; Occitan: Monpansèir) is a commune in the Puy-de-Dôme département in Auvergne-Rhône-Alpes region of central France.

Its inhabitants are called Montpensierois or Montpensiérois.

== See also ==
- Communes of the Puy-de-Dôme department
