= Chaptuzat =

- Commune
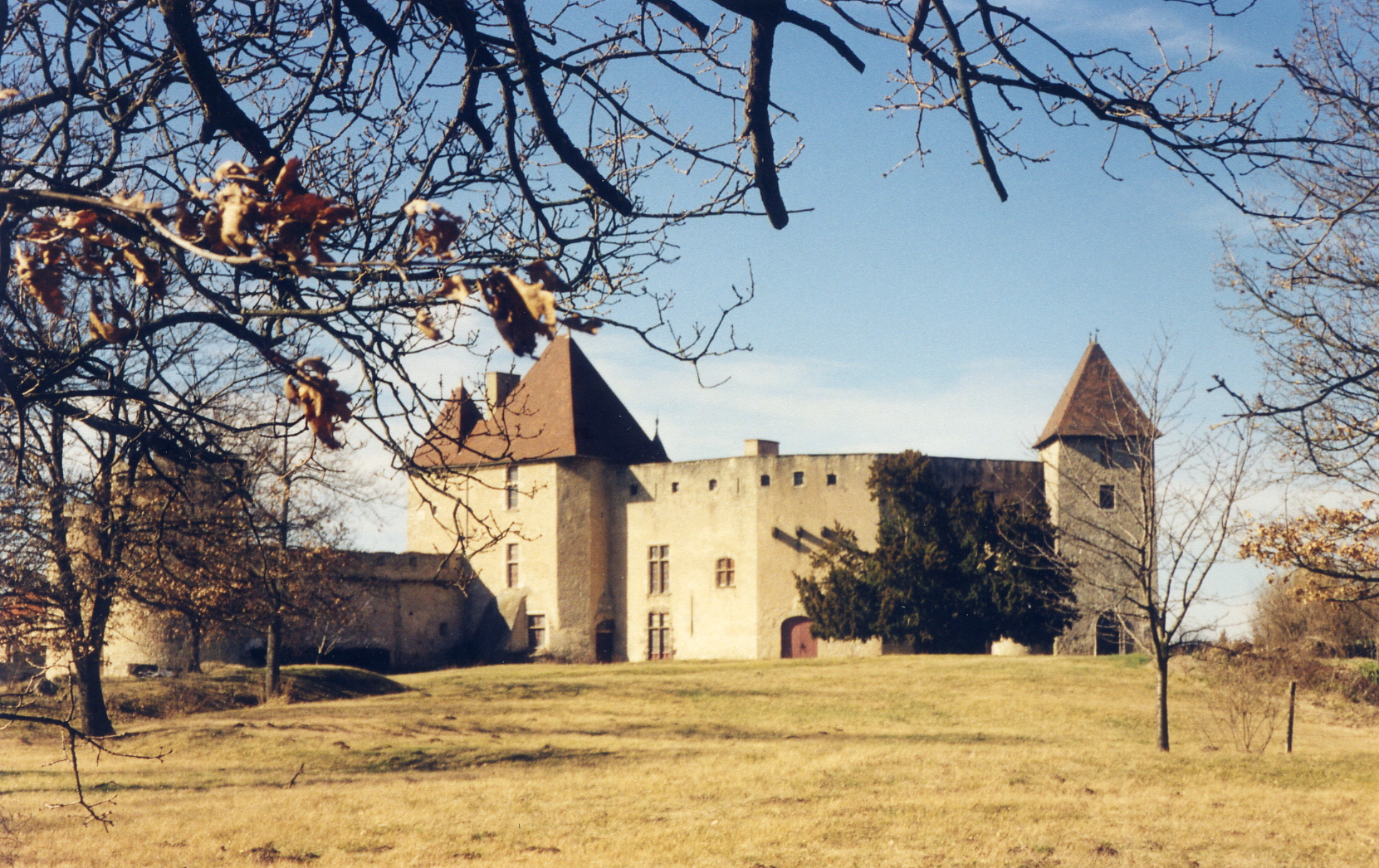
- Château de La Roche in Chaptuzat

- Coat of arms
- Location of Chaptuzat
- Location within France Location within Auvergne-Rhône-Alpes
- Coordinates: 46°01′58″N 3°10′44″E
- Country: France
- Region: Auvergne-Rhône-Alpes
- Department: Puy-de-Dôme
- Arrondissement: Riom
- Canton: Aigueperse
- Intercommunality: CC Plaine Limagne

Government
  - Mayor (2026–32): Pierre Grimaud
- Area^{1}: 8.24 km^{2} (3.18 sq mi)
- Elevation: 354 m (1,161 ft)
- Highest elevation: 535 m (1,755 ft)
- Lowest elevation: 352 m (1,155 ft)
- Population (2023): 485
  - Density: 58.9/km^{2} (152/sq mi)
- Time zone: UTC+01:00 (CET)
  - Summer (DST): UTC+02:00 (CEST)
- INSEE/Postal code: 63090 /63260
- ^{1} French Land Register data, which excludes lakes, ponds, glaciers > 1 km^{2} (0.386 sq mi or 247 acres) and river estuaries.

Chaptuzat (French pronunciation: [ʃaptyza]; Occitan: Chaptusac) is a commune in the Puy-de-Dôme department in Auvergne-Rhône-Alpes in central France. It is in the canton of Aigueperse.

== See also ==
- Communes of the Puy-de-Dôme department
