= Martres-sur-Morge =

- Commune
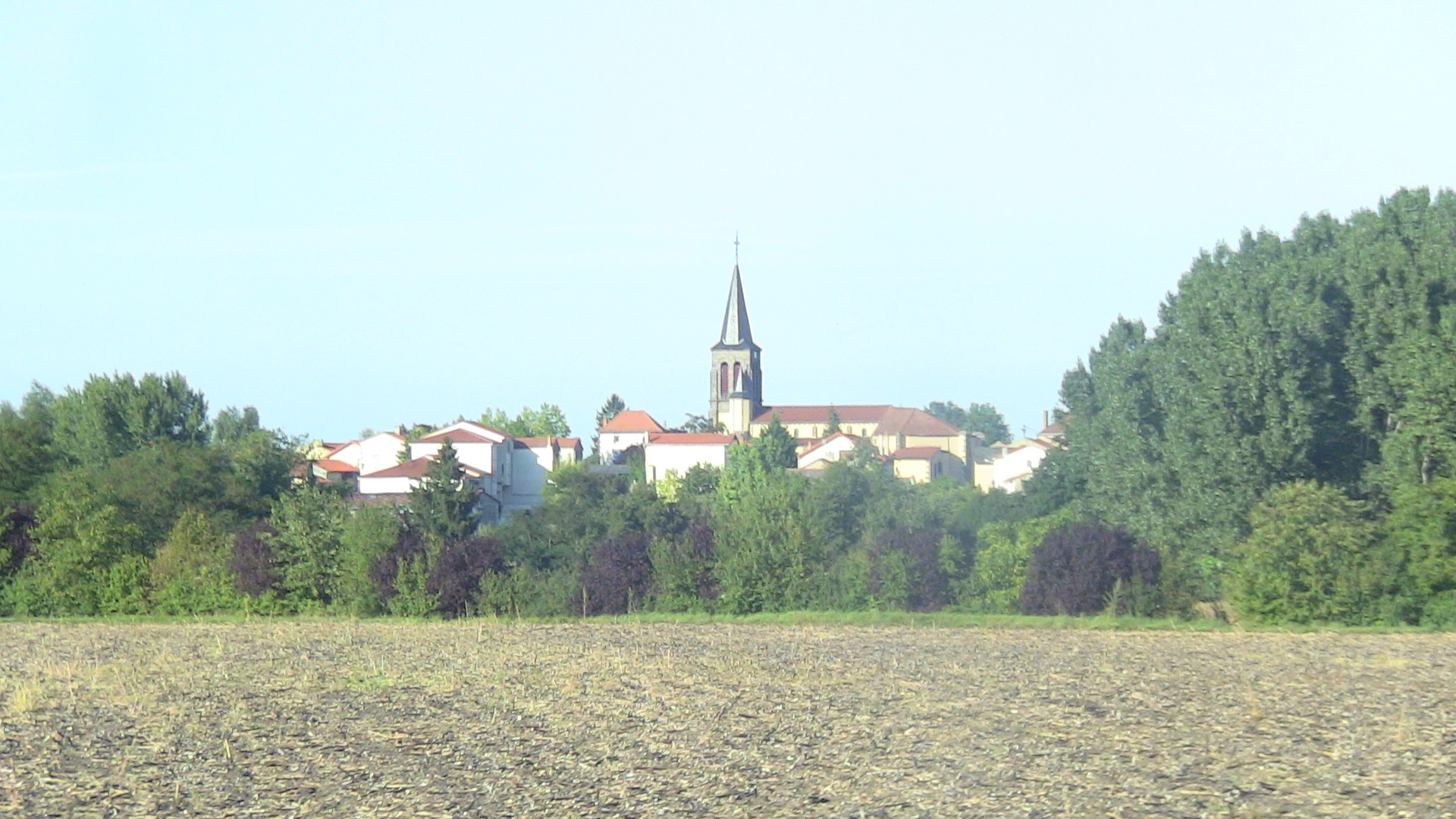
- A general view of Martres-sur-Morge

- Coat of arms
- Location of Martres-sur-Morge
- Location within France Location within Auvergne-Rhône-Alpes
- Coordinates: 45°56′16″N 3°13′16″E
- Country: France
- Region: Auvergne-Rhône-Alpes
- Department: Puy-de-Dôme
- Arrondissement: Riom
- Canton: Aigueperse
- Intercommunality: CA Riom Limagne et Volcans

Government
  - Mayor (2020–2026): Eugène Chassagne
- Area^{1}: 8.22 km^{2} (3.17 sq mi)
- Elevation: 320 m (1,050 ft)
- Highest elevation: 335 m (1,099 ft)
- Lowest elevation: 308 m (1,010 ft)
- Population (2023): 758
  - Density: 92.2/km^{2} (239/sq mi)
- Time zone: UTC+01:00 (CET)
  - Summer (DST): UTC+02:00 (CEST)
- INSEE/Postal code: 63215 /63720
- ^{1} French Land Register data, which excludes lakes, ponds, glaciers > 1 km^{2} (0.386 sq mi or 247 acres) and river estuaries.

Martres-sur-Morge (French pronunciation: [maʁtʁ syʁ mɔʁʒ]) is a commune in the Puy-de-Dôme department in Auvergne in central France.

== See also ==
- Communes of the Puy-de-Dôme department
