= Charbonnières-les-Varennes =

- Commune
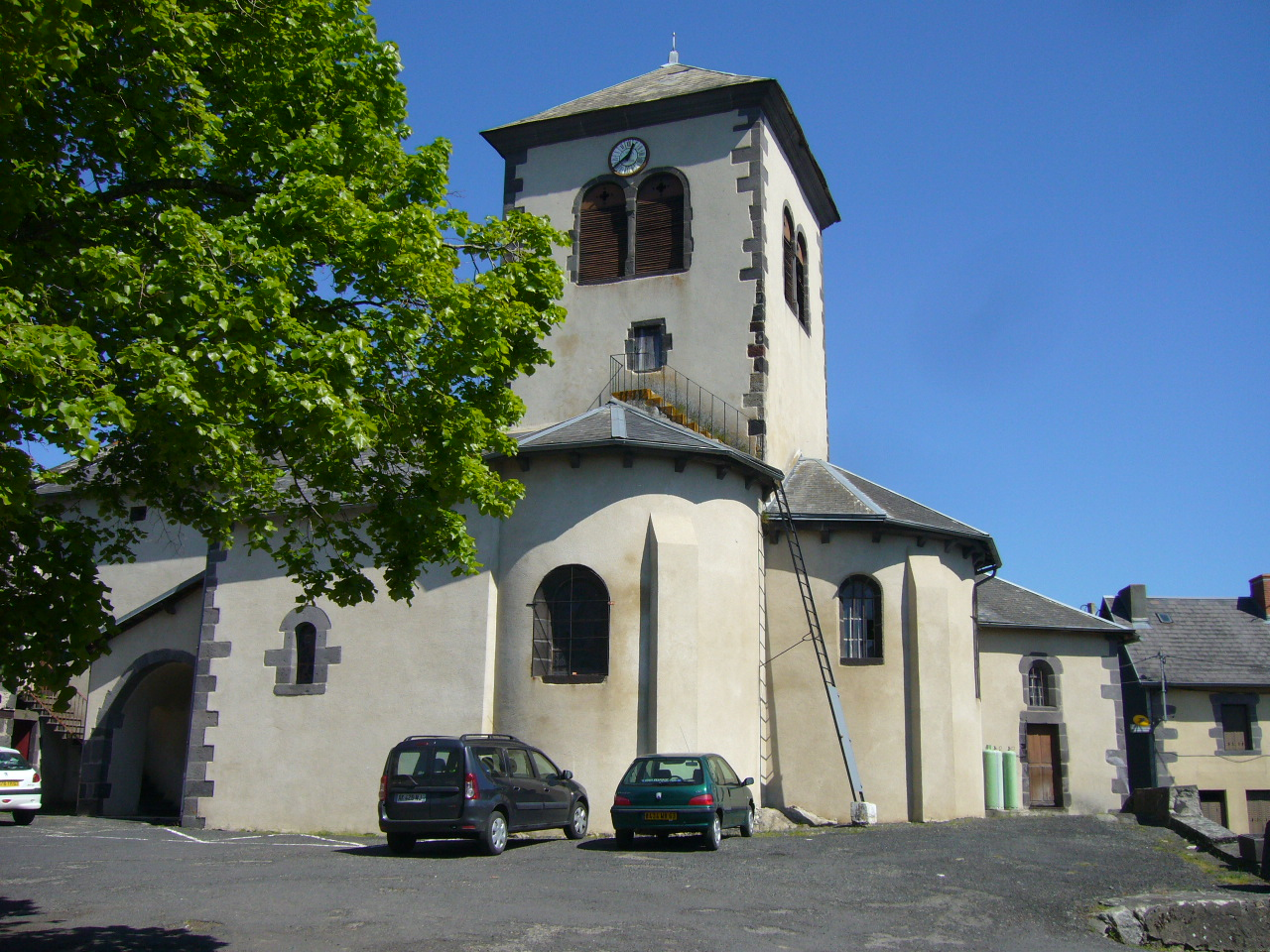
- The church in Charbonnières-les-Varennes
- Location of Charbonnières-les-Varennes
- Location within France Location within Auvergne-Rhône-Alpes
- Coordinates: 45°54′31″N 3°00′02″E
- Country: France
- Region: Auvergne-Rhône-Alpes
- Department: Puy-de-Dôme
- Arrondissement: Riom
- Canton: Saint-Ours
- Intercommunality: CA Riom Limagne et Volcans

Government
  - Mayor (2026–32): Gérard Chansard
- Area^{1}: 32.12 km^{2} (12.40 sq mi)
- Elevation: 750 m (2,460 ft)
- Highest elevation: 964 m (3,163 ft)
- Lowest elevation: 496 m (1,627 ft)
- Population (2023): 1,935
  - Density: 60.24/km^{2} (156.0/sq mi)
- Time zone: UTC+01:00 (CET)
  - Summer (DST): UTC+02:00 (CEST)
- INSEE/Postal code: 63092 /63410
- ^{1} French Land Register data, which excludes lakes, ponds, glaciers > 1 km^{2} (0.386 sq mi or 247 acres) and river estuaries.

Charbonnières-les-Varennes (French pronunciation: [ʃaʁbɔnjɛʁ le vaʁɛn]) is a commune in the Puy-de-Dôme department in Auvergne-Rhône-Alpes in central France.

== See also ==
- Communes of the Puy-de-Dôme department
