= Pessat-Villeneuve =

- Commune
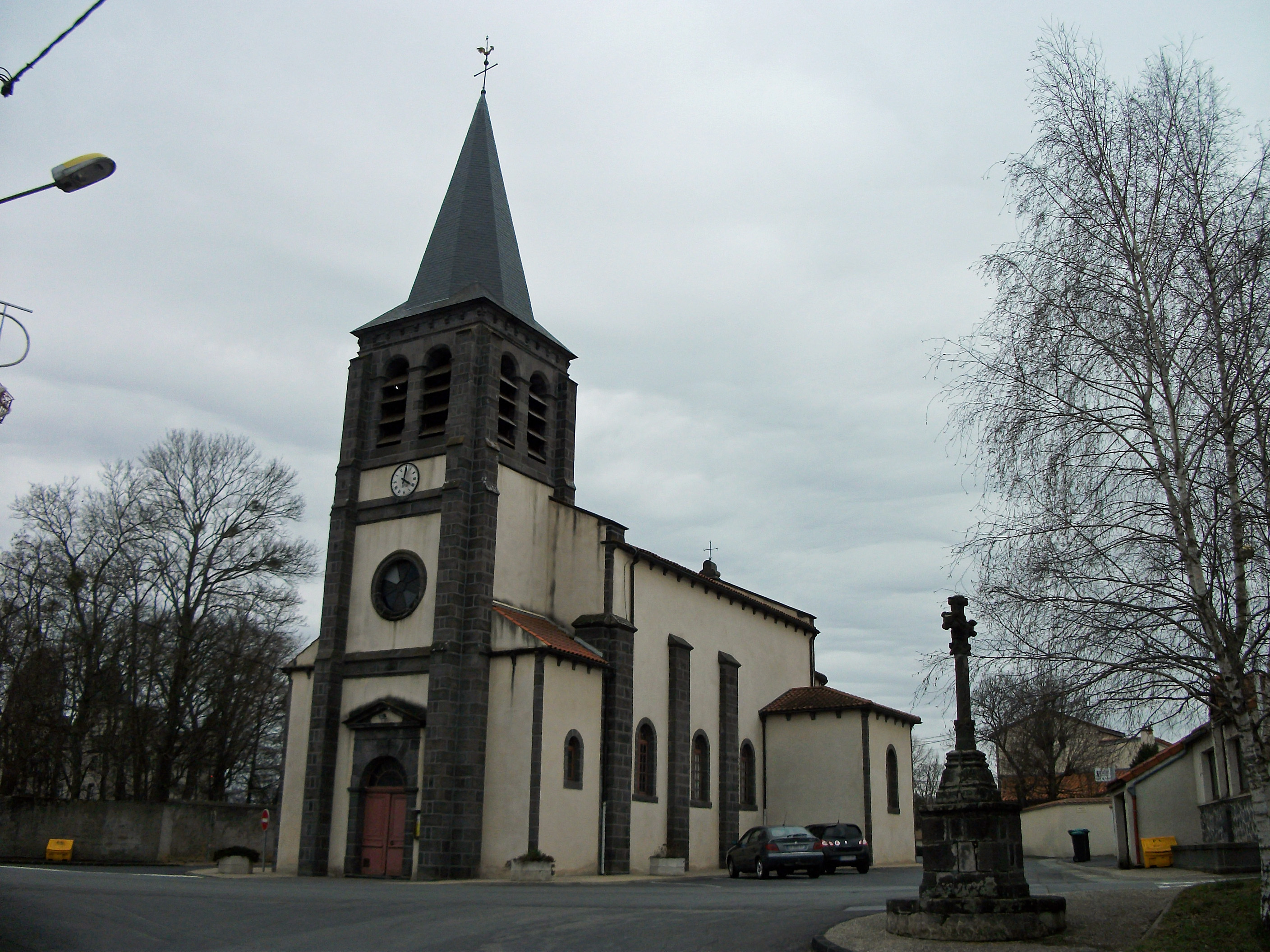
- The church in Pessat-Villeneuve

- Coat of arms
- Location of Pessat-Villeneuve
- Location within France Location within Auvergne-Rhône-Alpes
- Coordinates: 45°55′44″N 3°09′25″E
- Country: France
- Region: Auvergne-Rhône-Alpes
- Department: Puy-de-Dôme
- Arrondissement: Riom
- Canton: Riom
- Intercommunality: CA Riom Limagne et Volcans

Government
  - Mayor (2020–2026): Gérard Dubois
- Area^{1}: 6.26 km^{2} (2.42 sq mi)
- Elevation: 332 m (1,089 ft)
- Highest elevation: 356 m (1,168 ft)
- Lowest elevation: 313 m (1,027 ft)
- Population (2023): 745
  - Density: 119/km^{2} (308/sq mi)
- Time zone: UTC+01:00 (CET)
  - Summer (DST): UTC+02:00 (CEST)
- INSEE/Postal code: 63278 /63200
- ^{1} French Land Register data, which excludes lakes, ponds, glaciers > 1 km^{2} (0.386 sq mi or 247 acres) and river estuaries.

Pessat-Villeneuve (French pronunciation: [pɛsa vilnœv]) is a commune in the Puy-de-Dôme department near [Riom] in Auvergne in central France.

== See also ==
- Communes of the Puy-de-Dôme department
