= Pulvérières =

- Commune
- Location of Pulvérières
- Location within France Location within Auvergne-Rhône-Alpes
- Coordinates: 45°53′N 2°55′E
- Country: France
- Region: Auvergne-Rhône-Alpes
- Department: Puy-de-Dôme
- Arrondissement: Riom
- Canton: Saint-Ours
- Intercommunality: CA Riom Limagne et Volcans

Government
  - Mayor (2020–2026): Jacques Barbecot
- Area^{1}: 14.75 km^{2} (5.70 sq mi)
- Elevation: 880 m (2,890 ft)
- Highest elevation: 994 m (3,261 ft)
- Lowest elevation: 775 m (2,543 ft)
- Population (2023): 419
  - Density: 28.4/km^{2} (73.6/sq mi)
- Time zone: UTC+01:00 (CET)
  - Summer (DST): UTC+02:00 (CEST)
- INSEE/Postal code: 63290 /63230
- ^{1} French Land Register data, which excludes lakes, ponds, glaciers > 1 km^{2} (0.386 sq mi or 247 acres) and river estuaries.

Pulvérières (French pronunciation: [pylveʁjɛʁ]) is a commune in the Puy-de-Dôme department in Auvergne in central France.

== See also ==
- Communes of the Puy-de-Dôme department
