= Saint-Ignat =

- Commune
- Coat of arms
- Location of Saint-Ignat
- Location within France Location within Auvergne-Rhône-Alpes
- Coordinates: 45°55′26″N 3°16′30″E
- Country: France
- Region: Auvergne-Rhône-Alpes
- Department: Puy-de-Dôme
- Arrondissement: Riom
- Canton: Aigueperse
- Intercommunality: CA Riom Limagne et Volcans

Government
  - Mayor (2026–32): Philippe Cartailler
- Area^{1}: 15.37 km^{2} (5.93 sq mi)
- Elevation: 308 m (1,010 ft)
- Highest elevation: 331 m (1,086 ft)
- Lowest elevation: 292 m (958 ft)
- Population (2023): 916
  - Density: 59.6/km^{2} (154/sq mi)
- Time zone: UTC+01:00 (CET)
  - Summer (DST): UTC+02:00 (CEST)
- INSEE/Postal code: 63362 /63720
- ^{1} French Land Register data, which excludes lakes, ponds, glaciers > 1 km^{2} (0.386 sq mi or 247 acres) and river estuaries.

Saint-Ignat (French pronunciation: [sɛ̃.t‿iɲa]; Occitan: Sent Inhat) is a commune in the Puy-de-Dôme department in Auvergne in central France.

== See also ==
- Communes of the Puy-de-Dôme department
