= Entraigues, Puy-de-Dôme =

Entraigues
- Commune
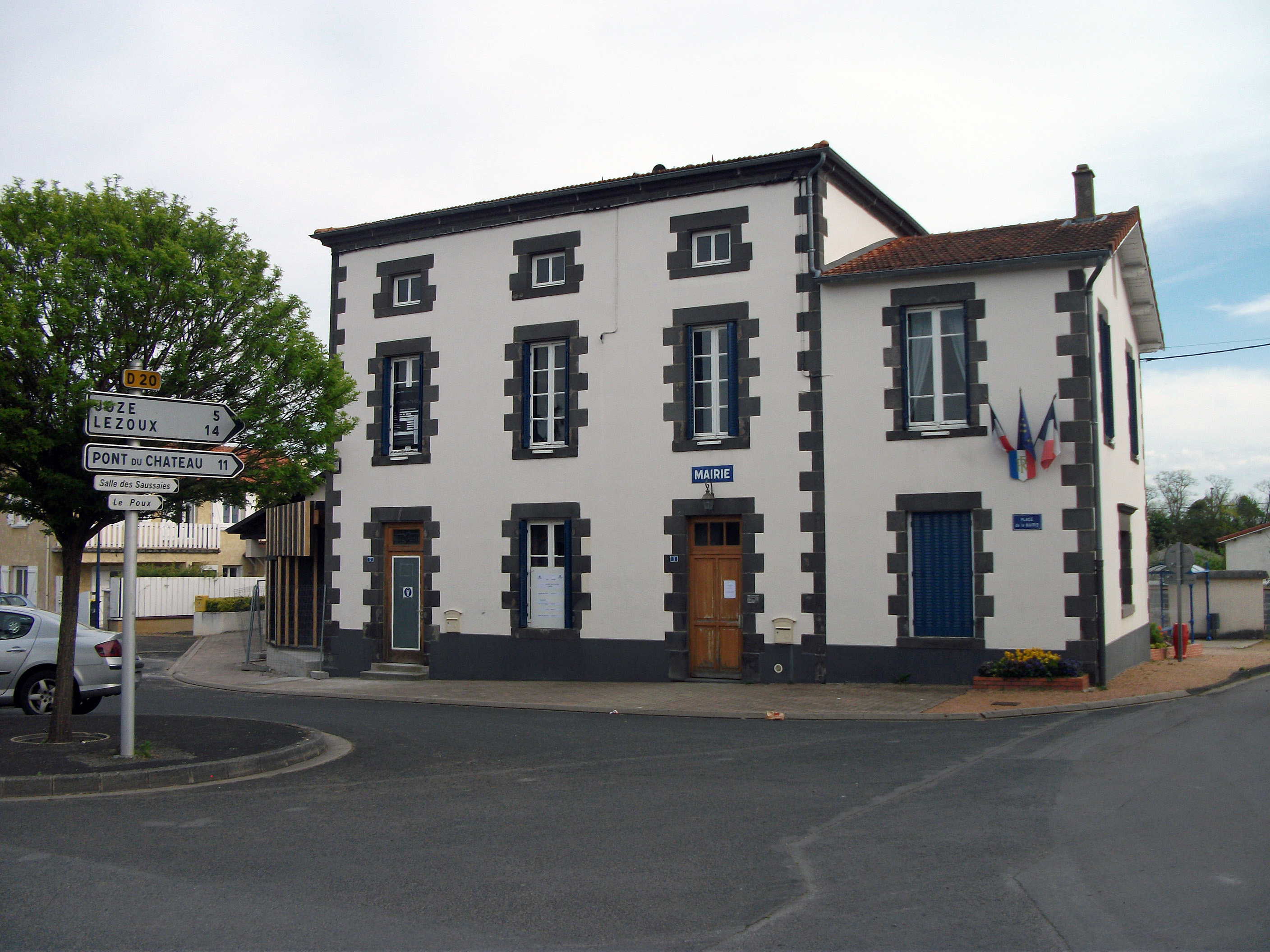
- The town hall in Entraigues
- Location of Entraigues
- Location within France Location within Auvergne-Rhône-Alpes
- Coordinates: 45°53′27″N 3°15′42″E
- Country: France
- Region: Auvergne-Rhône-Alpes
- Department: Puy-de-Dôme
- Arrondissement: Riom
- Canton: Aigueperse
- Intercommunality: CA Riom Limagne et Volcans

Government
  - Mayor (2020–2026): Alain Déat
- Area^{1}: 9.72 km^{2} (3.75 sq mi)
- Elevation: 319 m (1,047 ft)
- Highest elevation: 341 m (1,119 ft)
- Lowest elevation: 307 m (1,007 ft)
- Population (2023): 734
  - Density: 75.5/km^{2} (196/sq mi)
- Time zone: UTC+01:00 (CET)
  - Summer (DST): UTC+02:00 (CEST)
- INSEE/Postal code: 63149 /63720
- ^{1} French Land Register data, which excludes lakes, ponds, glaciers > 1 km^{2} (0.386 sq mi or 247 acres) and river estuaries.

Entraigues (French pronunciation: [ɑ̃tʁɛɡ]; Occitan: Entraigas) is a commune in the Puy-de-Dôme department in Auvergne in central France.

== See also ==
- Communes of the Puy-de-Dôme department
