= Canton of Riom =

Coordinates: 45.89°N 3.11°E

Riom
- Canton
- Interactive map of Riom
- Country: France
- Region: Auvergne-Rhône-Alpes
- Department: Puy-de-Dôme
- No. of communes: {{{nbcomm}}}

Government
  - Representatives (2021–2028): Stéphanie Flori-Dutour; Jean-Philippe Perret
- Area: 63.94 km^{2} (24.69 sq mi)
- Population (2023): 24,136
  - Density: 377.5/km^{2} (977.7/sq mi)
- INSEE code: 63 25

The canton of Riom is an administrative division of the Puy-de-Dôme department, central France. It was created at the French canton reorganisation which came into effect in March 2015. Its seat is in Riom.

== Composition ==
It consists of the following communes:

1. Chambaron-sur-Morge
2. Le Cheix-sur-Morge
3. Pessat-Villeneuve
4. Riom
5. Saint-Bonnet-près-Riom

== Councillors ==
| Election | Councillors | Party | Occupation |
|---|---|---|---|
| 2015 | Stéphanie Flori-Dutour | DVD | Administrative executive |
| 2015 | Jean-Philippe Perret | DVD | Mayor of Saint-Bonnet-près-Riom |

== Pictures of the canton ==
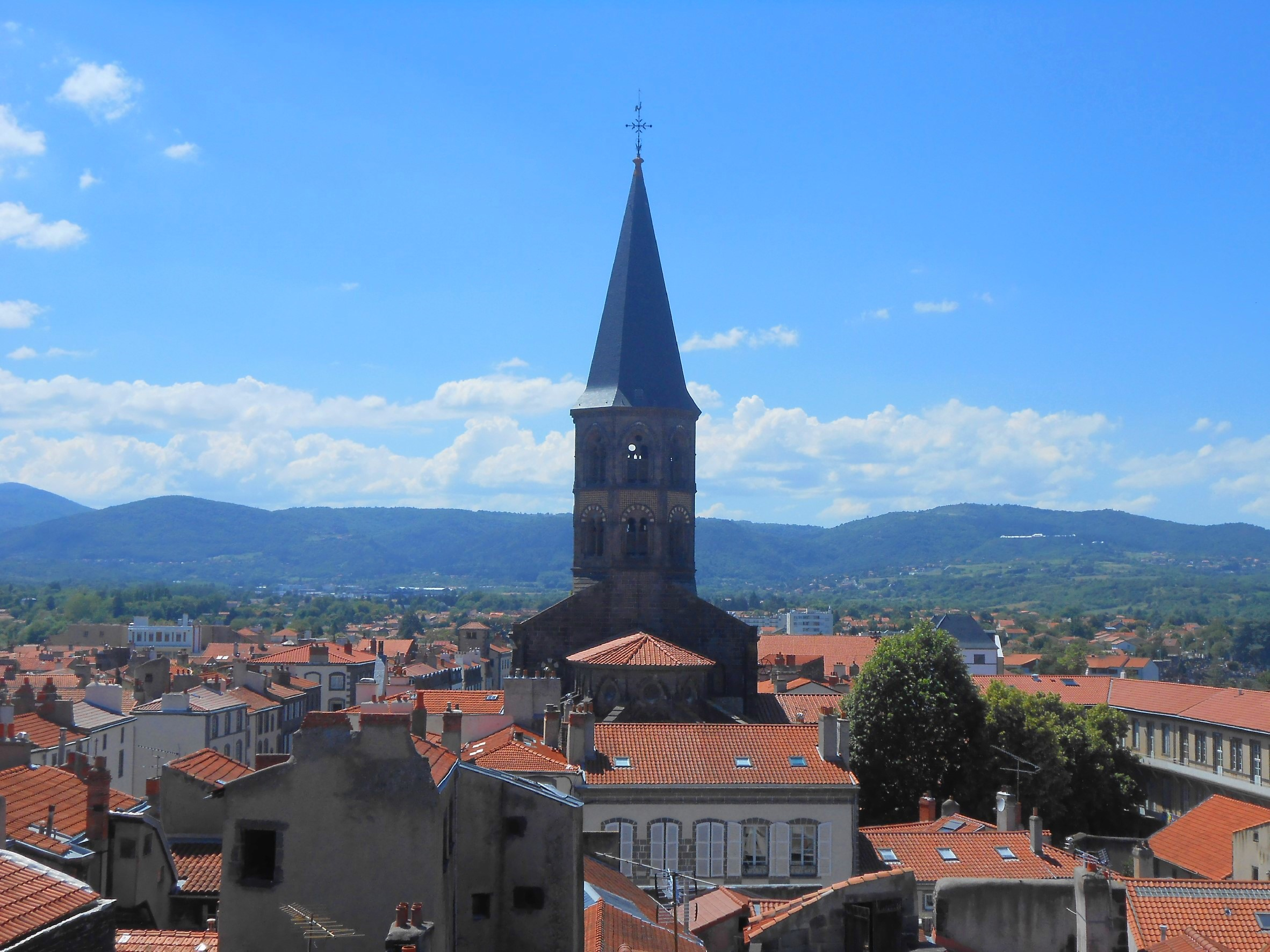
Riom and its roofs

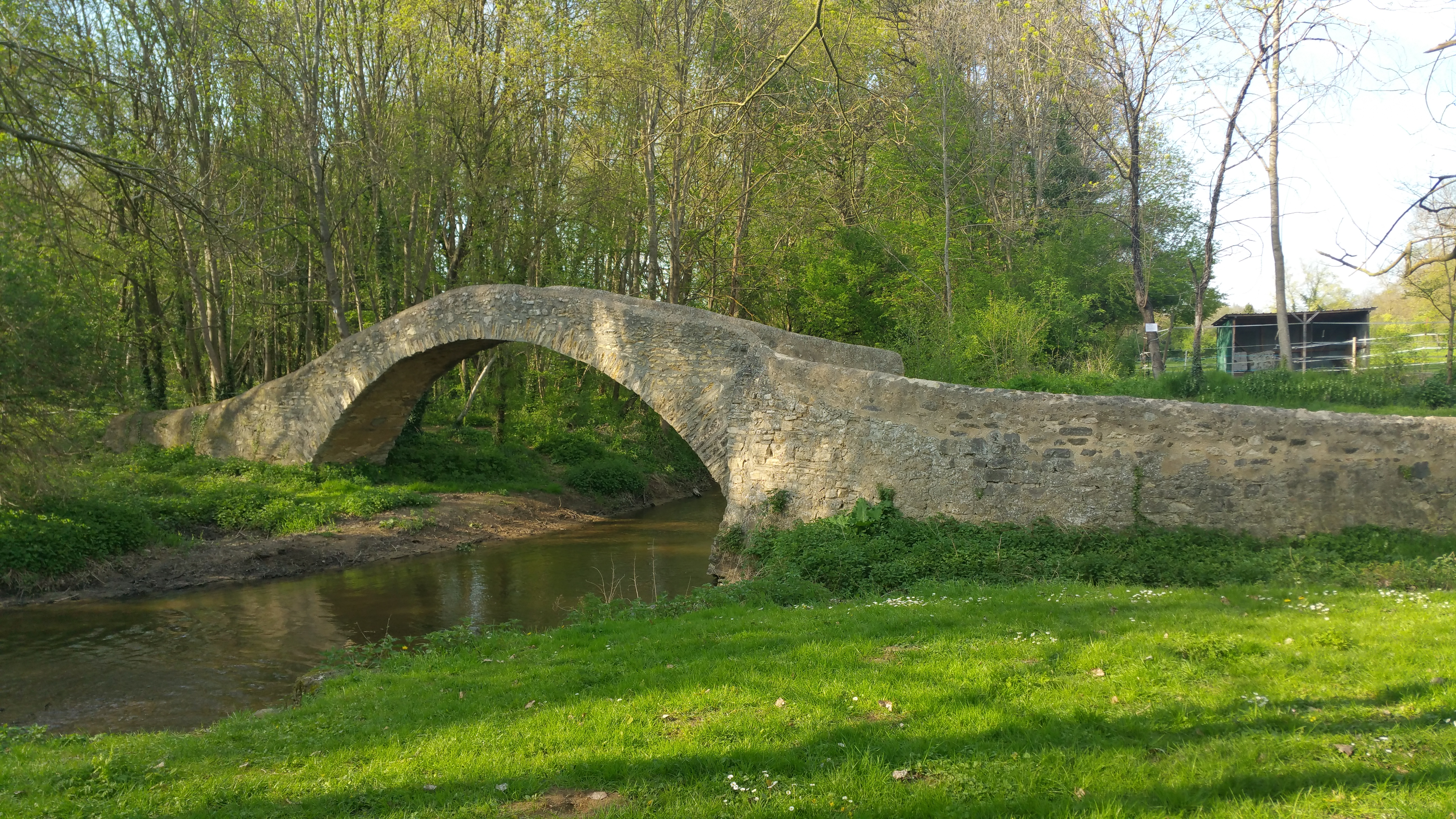
Roman bridge in Le Cheix-sur-Morge
