= Saint-Agoulin =

- Commune
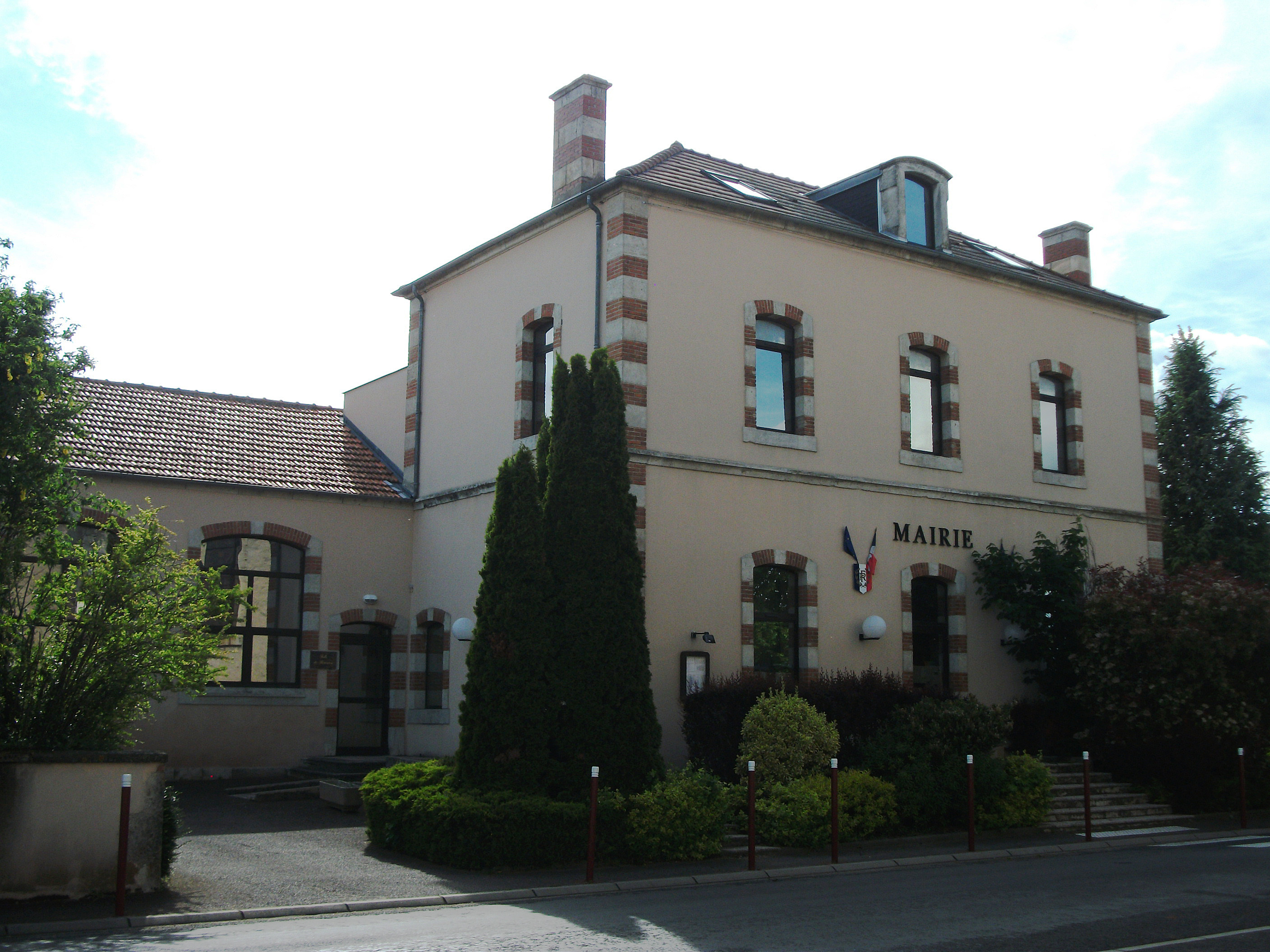
- The town hall in Saint-Agoulin

- Coat of arms
- Location of Saint-Agoulin
- Location within France Location within Auvergne-Rhône-Alpes
- Coordinates: 46°02′28″N 3°08′10″E
- Country: France
- Region: Auvergne-Rhône-Alpes
- Department: Puy-de-Dôme
- Arrondissement: Riom
- Canton: Aigueperse

Government
  - Mayor (2020–2026): Pascal Labbe
- Area^{1}: 9.34 km^{2} (3.61 sq mi)
- Elevation: 485 m (1,591 ft)
- Highest elevation: 578 m (1,896 ft)
- Lowest elevation: 397 m (1,302 ft)
- Population (2023): 310
  - Density: 33/km^{2} (86/sq mi)
- Time zone: UTC+01:00 (CET)
  - Summer (DST): UTC+02:00 (CEST)
- INSEE/Postal code: 63311 /63260
- ^{1} French Land Register data, which excludes lakes, ponds, glaciers > 1 km^{2} (0.386 sq mi or 247 acres) and river estuaries.

Saint-Agoulin (French pronunciation: [sɛ̃.t‿aɡulɛ̃]) is a commune in the Puy-de-Dôme department in Auvergne in central France.

== See also ==
- Communes of the Puy-de-Dôme department
