= Lussat, Puy-de-Dôme =

Lussat
- Commune
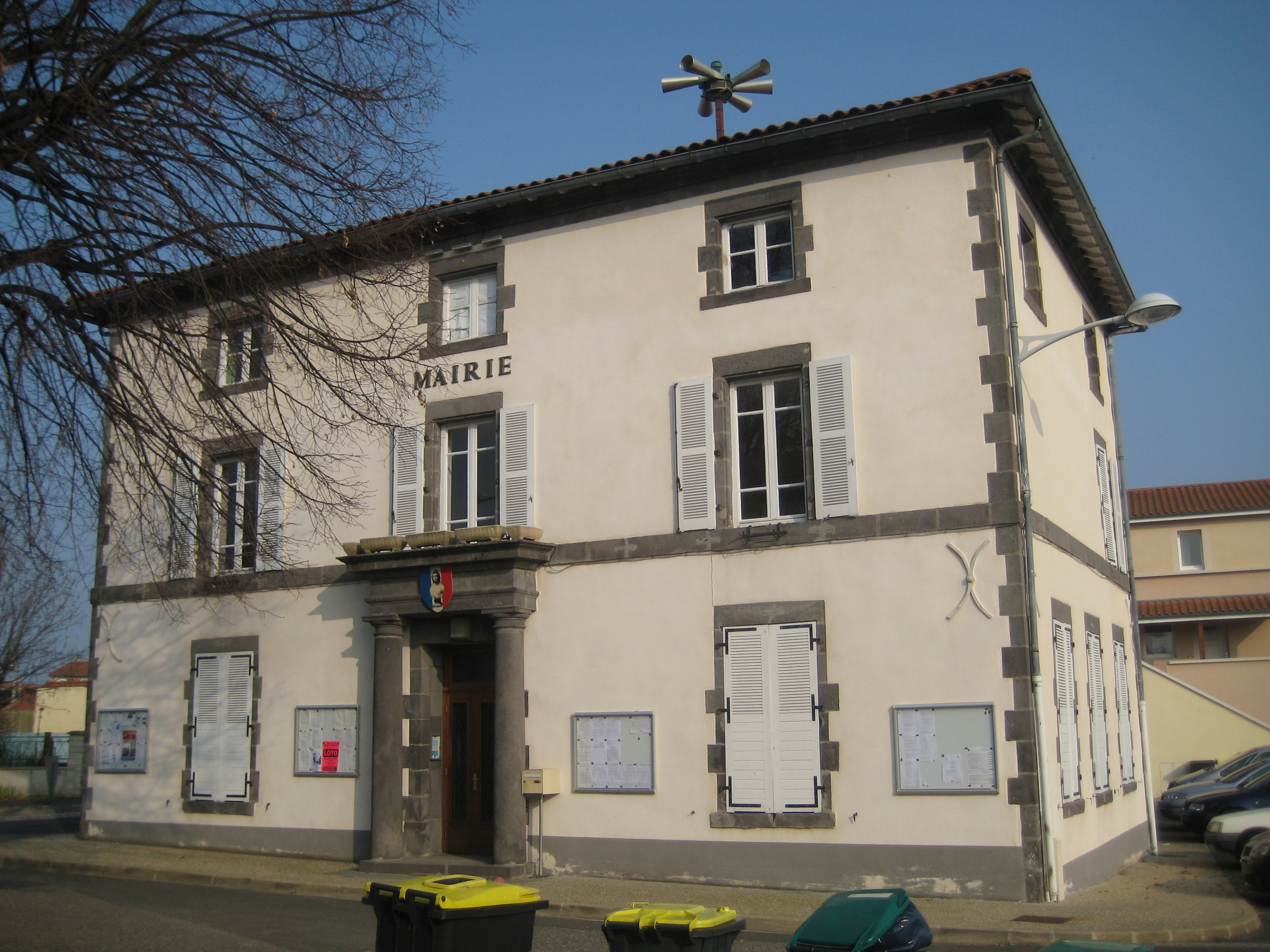
- The town hall in Lussat

- Coat of arms
- Location of Lussat
- Location within France Location within Auvergne-Rhône-Alpes
- Coordinates: 45°50′22″N 3°12′58″E
- Country: France
- Region: Auvergne-Rhône-Alpes
- Department: Puy-de-Dôme
- Arrondissement: Riom
- Canton: Aigueperse
- Intercommunality: CA Riom Limagne et Volcans

Government
  - Mayor (2026–32): Dominique Duché
- Area^{1}: 9.17 km^{2} (3.54 sq mi)
- Elevation: 319 m (1,047 ft)
- Highest elevation: 368 m (1,207 ft)
- Lowest elevation: 311 m (1,020 ft)
- Population (2023): 949
  - Density: 103/km^{2} (268/sq mi)
- Time zone: UTC+01:00 (CET)
  - Summer (DST): UTC+02:00 (CEST)
- INSEE/Postal code: 63200 /63360
- ^{1} French Land Register data, which excludes lakes, ponds, glaciers > 1 km^{2} (0.386 sq mi or 247 acres) and river estuaries.

Lussat (French pronunciation: [lysa]) is a commune in the Puy-de-Dôme department in Auvergne-Rhône-Alpes in central France.

== See also ==
- Communes of the Puy-de-Dôme department
