= Château de la Canière =

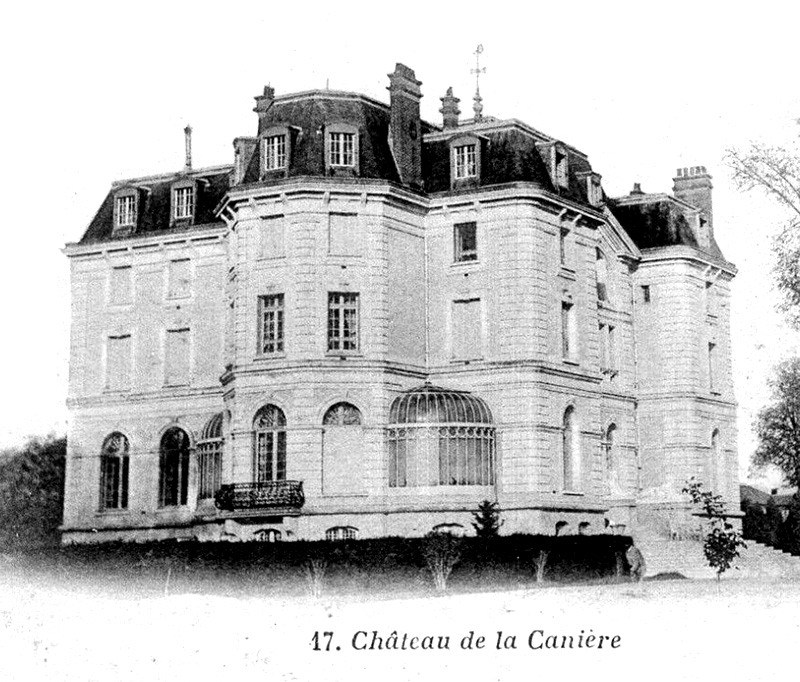
- Interactive map of the Château de la Canière area

General information
- Type: Château
- Location: Thuret, France
- Coordinates: 45.9857°N 3.2448°E
- Completed: 19th century

Design and construction
- Architect: Émile Camut

The Château de la Canière is a château in Thuret, Puy-de-Dôme, France. It was built in 1889 on the site of a previous château by the Bérard de Chazelles family to house the collections of their relative the chemist Antoine Lavoisier.
