= Abrest =

- Commune
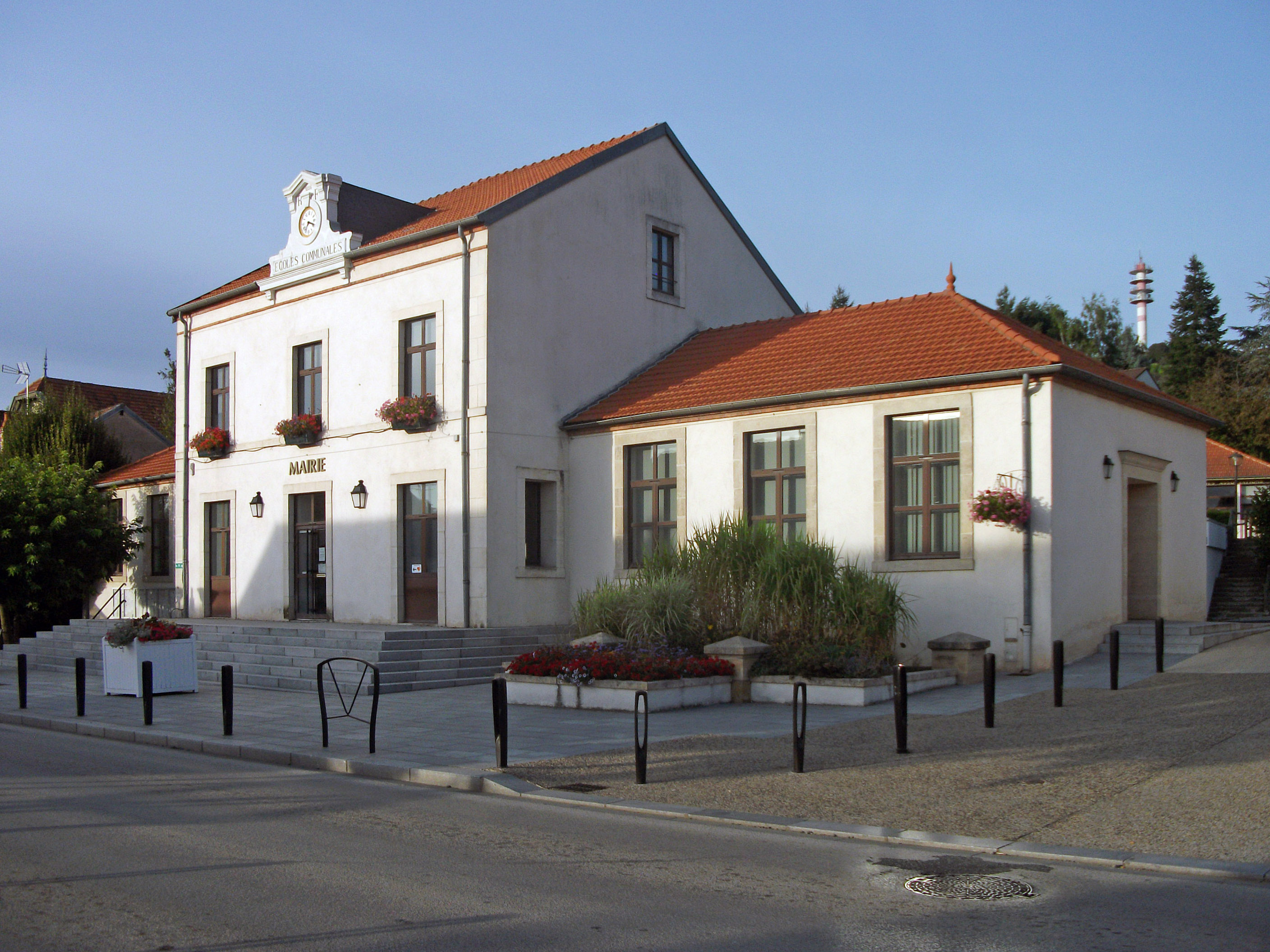
- Town hall in September 2013
- Location of Abrest
- Location within France Location within Auvergne-Rhône-Alpes
- Coordinates: 46°05′58″N 3°26′43″E
- Country: France
- Region: Auvergne-Rhône-Alpes
- Department: Allier
- Arrondissement: Vichy
- Canton: Vichy-2
- Intercommunality: CA Vichy Communauté

Government
  - Mayor (2026–32): Romain Lopez
- Area^{1}: 10.46 km^{2} (4.04 sq mi)
- Elevation: 260 m (850 ft)
- Highest elevation: 434 m (1,424 ft)
- Lowest elevation: 251 m (823 ft)
- Population (2023): 2,915
  - Density: 278.7/km^{2} (721.8/sq mi)
- Demonym(s): Abrestois, Abrestoises
- Time zone: UTC+01:00 (CET)
  - Summer (DST): UTC+02:00 (CEST)
- INSEE/Postal code: 03001 /03200
- Website: abrest.fr
- ^{1} French Land Register data, which excludes lakes, ponds, glaciers > 1 km^{2} (0.386 sq mi or 247 acres) and river estuaries.

Abrest (French pronunciation: [abʁɛ]; Occitan: Abrèt) is a commune in the Allier department in the Auvergne-Rhône-Alpes region of central France.

The commune is one of the 37 communes in the urban area of Vichy and is also part of Vichy Auvergne countryside.

== Geography ==
=== Location ===
Abrest is located about 3 kilometres (1.9 mi) south of Vichy and 4 kilometres (2.5 mi) north of Saint-Yorre. The commune straddles the Allier River with the river forming the western boundary of the commune in the southern portion. Departmental road 131 traverses some hamlets of the commune on the west bank of the Allier while departmental road 906e (former D906): Avenue de Vichy and Avenue de Thiers is on the east bank and passes through the centre of the town from Vichy to Saint-Yorre. The commune also contains Mount Bourbon and Bourbon Lamagne.

=== Localities and Hamlets ===
- Right Bank: Abrest, Quinssat, Les Béarnais, Les Dollots, Les Jacquets, Les Rémondins, Les Chaussins, Les Séjournins.
- Left Bank: La Sablière, La Boire, La Tour, Les Sables.

=== Communications ===
==== Roads ====
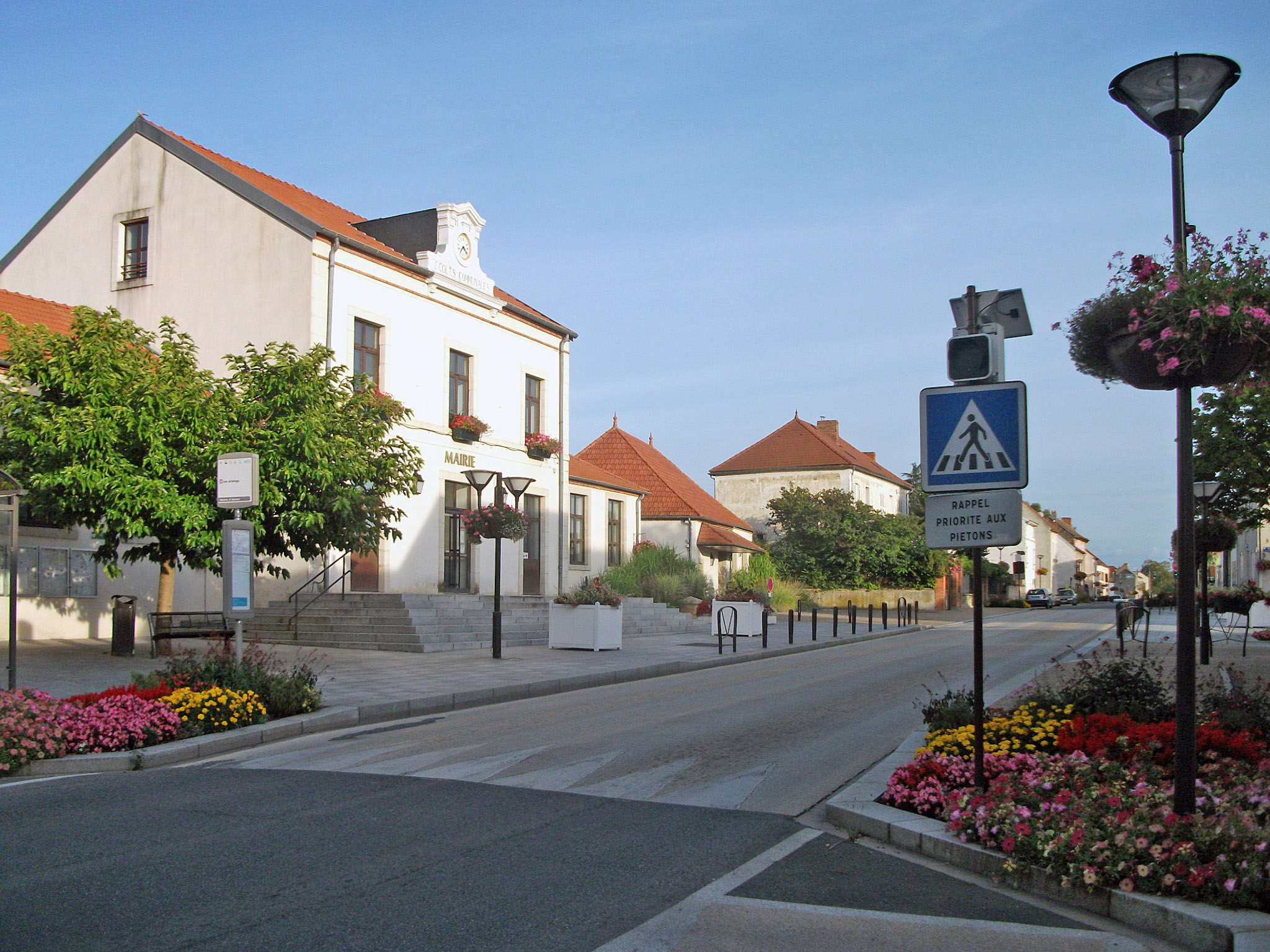
The Abrest Town Hall with its bus stop for Line D at the left and towards Saint-Yorre to the right in September 2013.

The town is traversed by the D906e (former D906) road which links Le Puy-en-Velay, Thiers, Puy-Guillaume, and Saint-Yorre to Vichy which is the main axis of movement. Historically this road was National Highway 106 from Nimes to Saint-Gérand-le-Puy. This route is heavily used by trucks, so could be described as a problematic area.

The town is far from any motorway: the A719 motorway (which enables access to the A71) is 20 kilometres (12 mi) to the west and the A89 motorway (junction Thiers-West) is 30 kilometres (19 mi) away.

The Southwest Bypass (contournement sud-ouest), which aims to divert the flow of heavy vehicles, will be opened in 2016.

Departmental roads traversing the territory of the commune are

- D426 from Vichy to Abrest via ZA de la Croix Saint-Martin and the camp ground;
- D126 from Cusset to Abrest via Côte Saint-Amand;
- D131 from Vichy to Hauterive (along the left bank) serving the business area La Tour;
- D175 from Cusset to the D43 (63) via Le Vernet and Busset along the commune border with Le Vernet, accessible from the Quinssat road.

==== Public transports ====
Abrest is served by two of the nine lines of the transit network MobiVie:

- Route D serves the right bank (camp ground, Stadium of Graviers, the Castle, Town Hall, and the Biernets district) and runs from Monday to Saturday with four outbound and five return trips per day.
- Route G serves the left bank (district and industrial area of La Tour and Les Sables) and runs from Monday to Saturday with five runs per day.
- Custom MobiVie is a transport service on demand which is available to connect with routes B and D on the right bank, and routes B and C on the left bank.

Only the Dollots district in the south is served by the TER between Vichy and Pont-de-Dore, Thiers, and Arlanc (6 daily round trips). This service also runs on Sundays and holidays (3 return trips).

Route 55 (Vichy-Châteldon-Puy-Guillaume) of the Transdôme network serves Abrest (one round trip per day and two during the school year) serves the town centre and Dollots.

==== Cycling ====
There are no cycle routes in right bank of Allier and no bicycle parkings.

==== Rail ====
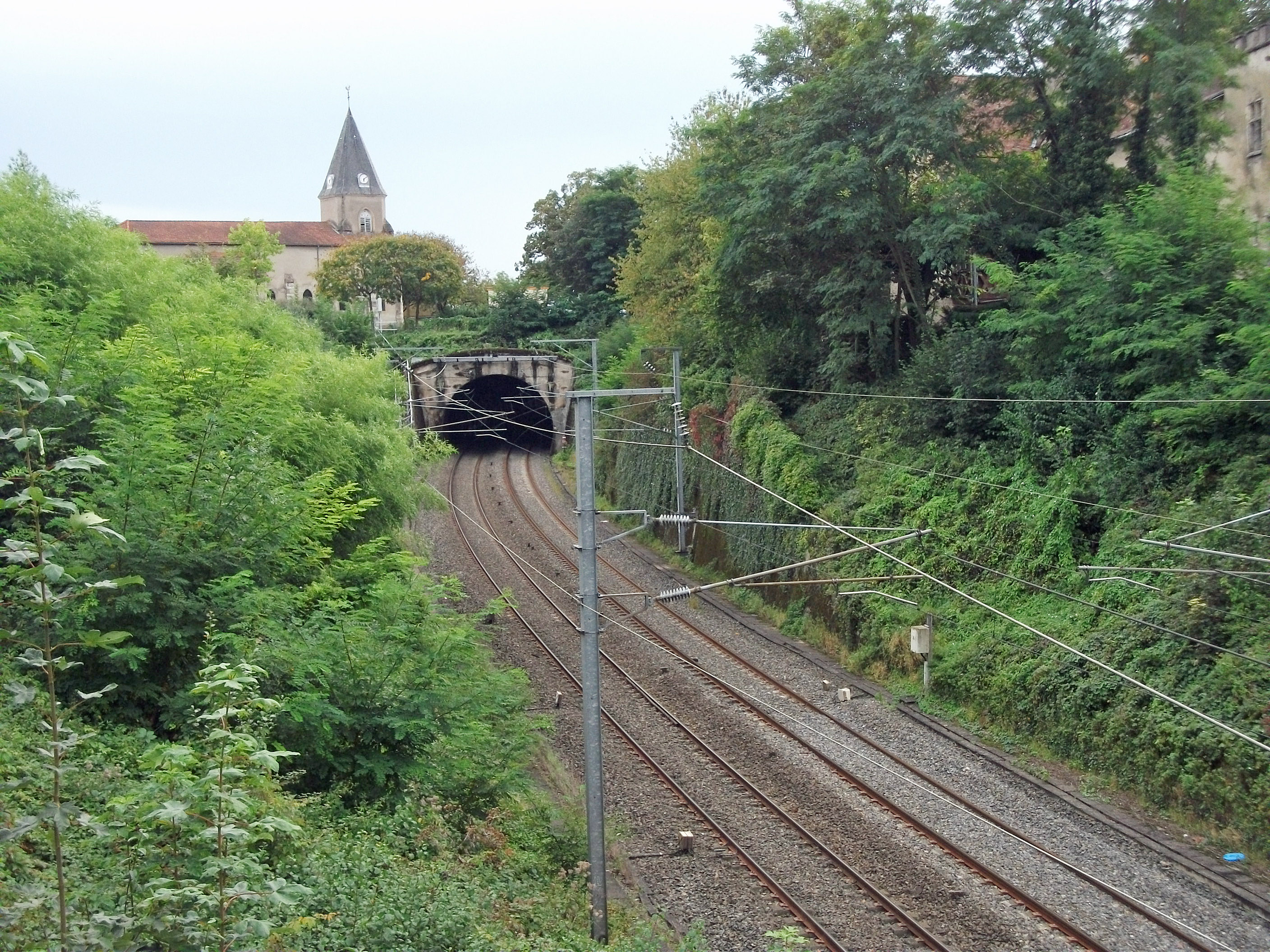
Tunnel entrance passing under the town

The commune has no railway station but it is traversed by two railway lines:

- Vichy–Riom railway;
- Saint-Germain-des-Fossés–Darsac railway (freight traffic only).

=== Urban Planning ===
Between 2008 and 2010, the development of Highway D906 was conducted in two phases under a communal contract for construction of the town:

Firstly, in 2008 with the creation of a 30 kilometres per hour (19 mph) zone (Note: Since 2008, the speed was limited to 30 kilometres per hour (19 mph) without any special enactment.) and road humps with a pedestrian crossing and secondly in 2009-2010, the development of the D906 road to the right of the town hall. (Note: This development was followed by: a complete reconstruction of the roadway, the implementation of road humps to slow the traffic at the pedestrian crossing (2009) followed by a flattened road hump beside the town hall about 70 metres long to assist pedestrians crossing the road (2009); the change to the Place des Anciens-Combattants (transformation of the parking to 4 minute stops); the replacement of traffic lights (2010); the creation of a parking area with four spaces including one for disabled people in the adjoining the next building.) The development has not altered the quality of the road: in some places the road has deteriorated due to the passage of heavy trucks, which can not take any other route.

=== Geology ===
The city is listed as a zone of low seismicity as are the majority of communes in the department. Its neighbouring communes, with the exception of Brugheas, are listed at the same level.

== History ==
The name of the commune in the form of ABRET (Latin arbor meaning "tree") was mentioned for the first time in 1301 in the Dictionary of Mr. Chazaud.

Abrest was formerly a parish in the diocese of Clermont. It was fortified at the end of the 16th century and the current commune lies on both banks of the Allier. This is quite unusual because in general important rivers tend to serve as communal boundaries.

At the highest point is an old castle called Hurlevants with a view across the Allier valley and the mountains of Auvergne. The Chaussins Castle dates from the 15th century. The construction of the church dates from 1793, and as for the Town Hall, it was built in 1886.

=== Activities in the commune ===
Wine: The commune was one of the main localities of the former wine coast along with Le Vernet, Creuzier-le-Vieux and to a lesser extent, Saint-Yorre and Cusset.

Jacques François Chomel in his Treatise of mineral water and baths of Vichy, appeared at Clermont in 1734 and wrote: "The wine in Vichy is good, the slopes of Abret [Abrest], of Crotte [extinct village located at the site of the Ailes district], Longevigne, the vintage of Celestins, of Ris, of Châteldon on the other side of the river Grave-la-rama [a place where Bellerive is currently], all these wines are good and are available in Paris."

The vineyards lasted until the early 20th century.

The small village of Biernets (which was written "Biernay" in the 18th century) was the most important wine village of the commune. There was a high proportion of vintners in the population (up to 70% of the population in 1750, as well as related activities such as cooperage).

The peak of the grape harvests was in the middle of the 19th century. Much of the slopes of Saint-Amand and Dollots hill were covered with vines.

The Rue des Vignes (Vines Street) and the Rue du Baril (Barrel street) are remnants of this activity.

Today, the vineyards have not completely disappeared, grapes are still cultivated a little in some places (2-3 family vineyards).

Port: Abrest was a small port on the right bank of the Allier. The impasse du Vieux-Port (Cul-de-sac of the Old Port) still bears witness. This port probably lived on a heavy traffic of wine.

== Politics and Administration ==
List of Successive Mayors of Abrest

From	To	Name	Party
1995	2009	René Boisset	PS
2009	2014	Christian Boch	DVG
2014	July 2020	Patrick Montagner	DVG then DVD
July 2020	Current	Romain Lopez	

=== Commune budget ===
Budget was in 2011: €1,526,546 in investment and €1,827,154 in fonctionnement.

== Population and Society ==
Its inhabitants are called Abrestois or Abrestoises in French.

=== Demographic change ===
Historical population

Year	Pop.	±% p.a.
1793	751	—
1800	957	+3.52%
1806	822	−2.50%
1821	828	+0.05%
1831	820	−0.10%
1836	845	+0.60%
1841	906	+1.40%
1846	903	−0.07%
1851	876	−0.61%
1856	866	−0.23%
1861	860	−0.14%
1866	919	+1.34%
1872	913	−0.11%
1876	887	−0.72%
1881	868	−0.43%
1886	875	+0.16%
1891	834	−0.96%
1896	803	−0.75%
1901	829	+0.64%

Year	Pop.	±% p.a.
1906	806	−0.56%
1911	875	+1.66%
1921	896	+0.24%
1926	1,036	+2.95%
1931	1,300	+4.64%
1936	1,210	−1.42%
1946	1,311	+0.80%
1954	1,479	+1.52%
1962	1,874	+3.00%
1968	2,026	+1.31%
1975	2,248	+1.50%
1982	2,309	+0.38%
1990	2,544	+1.22%
1999	2,428	−0.52%
2007	2,591	+0.82%
2012	2,794	+1.52%
2017	2,931	+0.96%
2023	2,915	−0.09%

Source: EHESS (1793-1999) and INSEE

== Economy ==
=== Employment ===
There were 1,775 people aged between 15 and 64 years in 2017 in the commune, of which 1,334 (75.2%) were active. 138 people (10.4% of the active population) were unemployed.

Distribution of the labor force and employment by socio-professional category in 2017 (INSEE)
	Agricultural Workers	Artisans, Shopkeepers, Business owners	Executives and Intellectuals	Middle Managers	Employees	Workers
Active Population	10	86	156	333	444	343
Employed Active People	10	86	151	313	394	293
No. of Jobs	10	61	113	220	196	284

85% of people who have a job work outside the commune of residence.

=== Businesses in the town ===
The commune of Abrest has a dozen companies in the business zone, ZA de la Tour, on the left bank of the Allier.

Businesses in the commune are:

- Industrial: Ligier Automobiles, SAEB - Old established Barber, Brooks Instrument;
- Construction: Paving Auvergne, SOPROMECO, Guelpa, Great Central Dredging, CMV ROSSIGNOL, Industrial Constructions - Cosinus
- Trade: Gedimat, Ulimed
- Services: NSE Services, RLD 1 - Vichy.

At the end of 2015, there were 212 establishments in the commune of Abrest, 161 (76%) of which were individual enterprises. 51 establishments had employees.

== Culture and heritage ==
=== Civil heritage ===
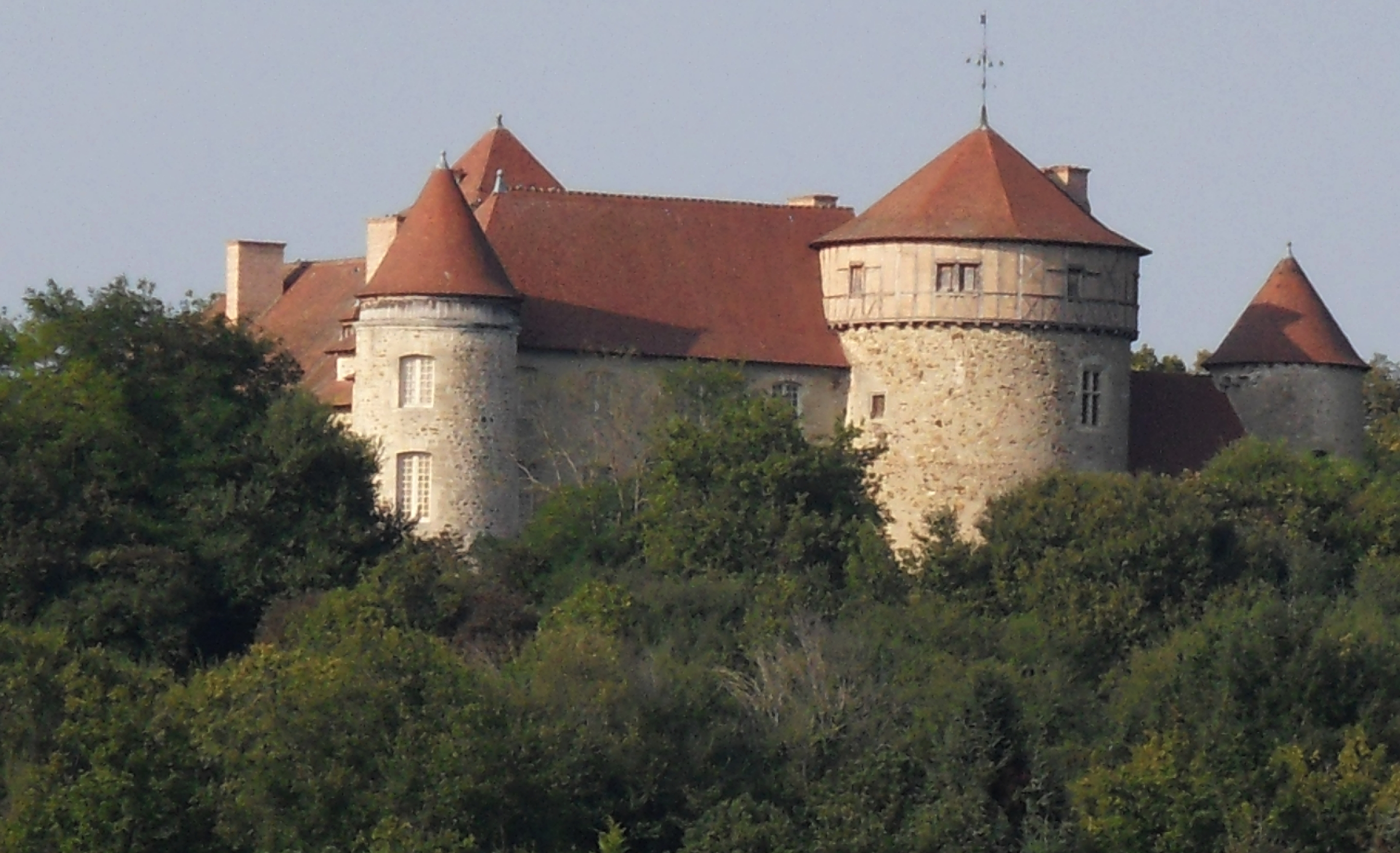
Chateau of Chaussins

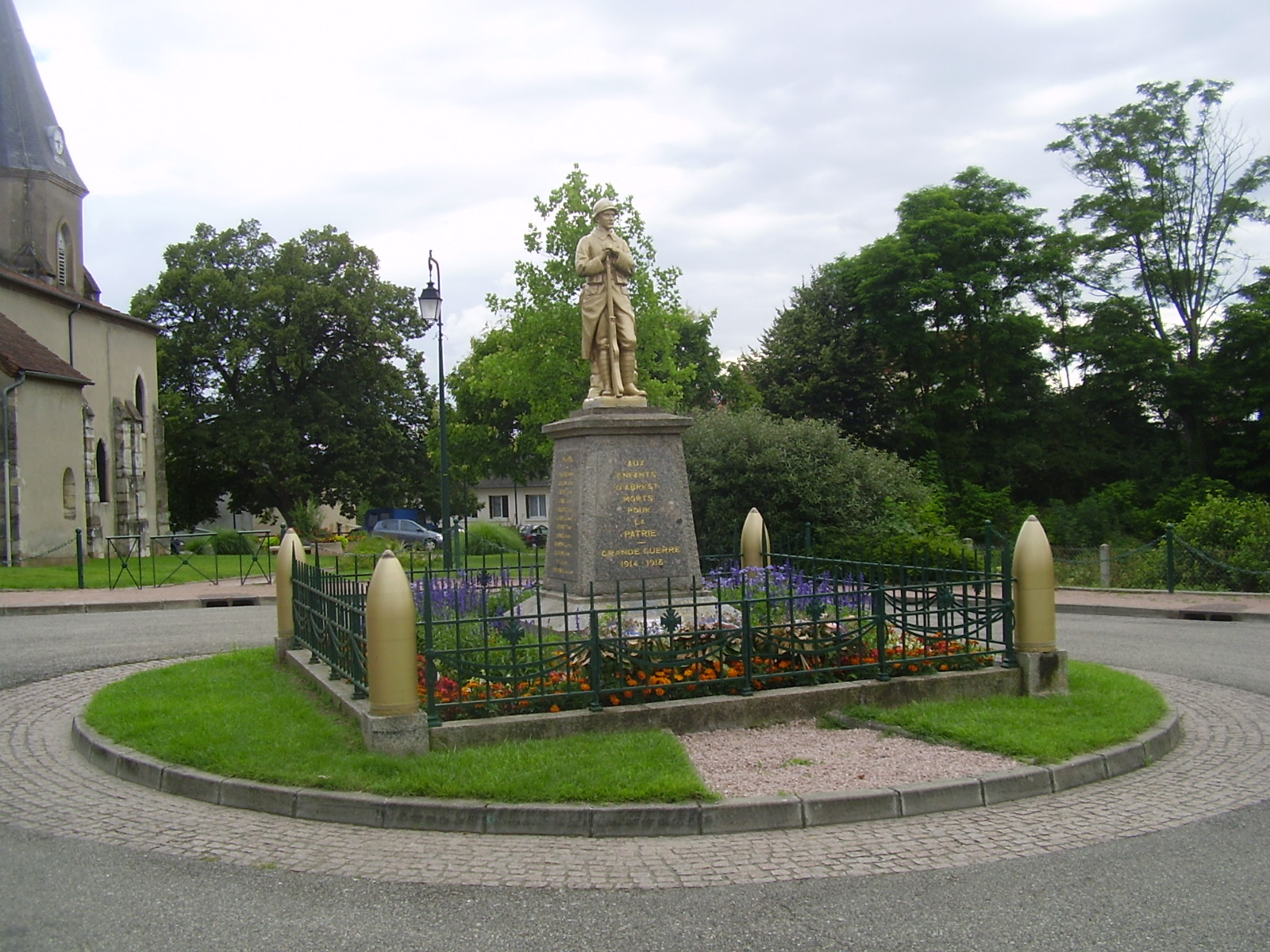
Abrest War memorial, Jean-Moulin Square

The commune has one building that is registered as a historical monument:

- The Chateau des Chaussins (14th century)

Other sites of interest

- 'Remains of a chateau in the town: the dovecote tower, partly rebuilt in the 19th century.
- The Chateau de Quinssat from the 17th century
- The Medieval tower of Maubet. Mentioned in the 13th century.

=== Religious heritage ===
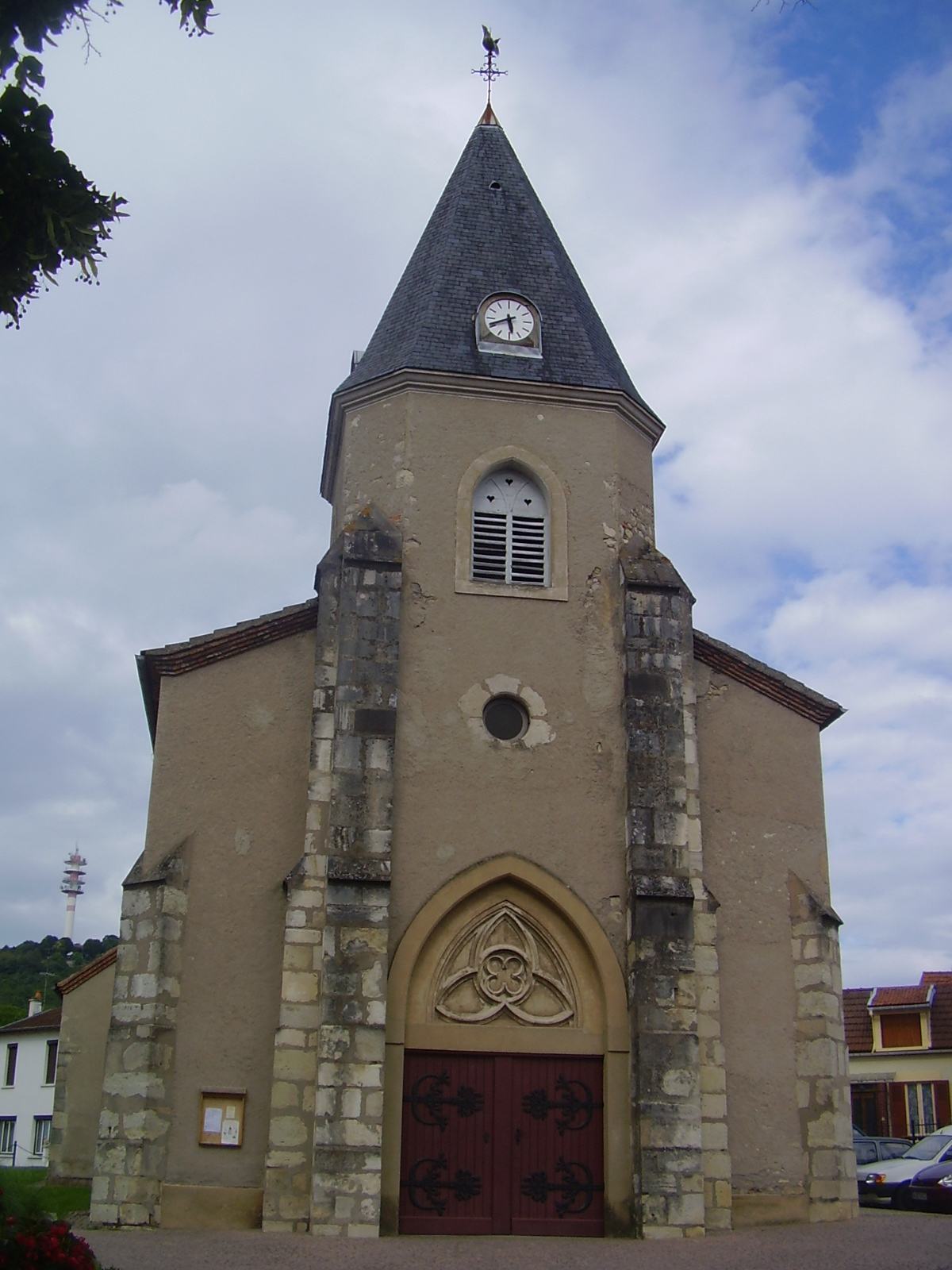
Abrest Church

- The Church of Abrest. Originally a Gothic church, it was almost entirely rebuilt in the 19th century.
- The Old parish church of the Diocese of Clermont, fortified at the end of the 16th century.

=== Environmental heritage ===
- Chènevière Floral and Forest Park

== Facilities ==
Since early 2006, the town has had a community centre and a municipal library located on the Avenue des Graviers - on the sloping part of the D426 - with 28 parking spaces, two for people with disabilities and reduced mobility.

The multi-purpose hall located on the right bank was rebuilt and renovated in 2009 and named Camille Claudel.

=== Education ===
The city has one public primary school located on the rue de Treuil and rue de la Croix (the development was secured in 2006 on two streets with 30 km/h zone and 1 + 3 speed humps, and in 2015).

=== Cultural events and festivities ===
Since 2001, the town of Abrest has organised an organic fair in May or June.

Every year in November, the communal staff of Abrest organize a traditional toy market.

=== Sports ===
Abrest has a football stadium, the Stade des Graviers, and a club: the US Abrest which creates promotions for the departmental district.

=== Notable People linked to the commune ===
- Louis Justin Marie, the last Marquis of Talaru Marquis and owner of the Chateau de Chaussins before the French Revolution
- André de Soixon was an important figure in Abrest. He lived a part of his life there and helped to develop the village, including rebuilding houses and helping the villagers. André de Soixon was of provincial gentry.

== See also ==
- Communes of the Allier department

=== External links ===
- Abrest official website (in French)
- Abrest on the BNF website (in French)
- Abrest on Géoportail, National Geographic Institute (IGN) website (in French)
- Abret on the 1750 Cassini Map
