= Beaumont-lès-Randan =

- Commune
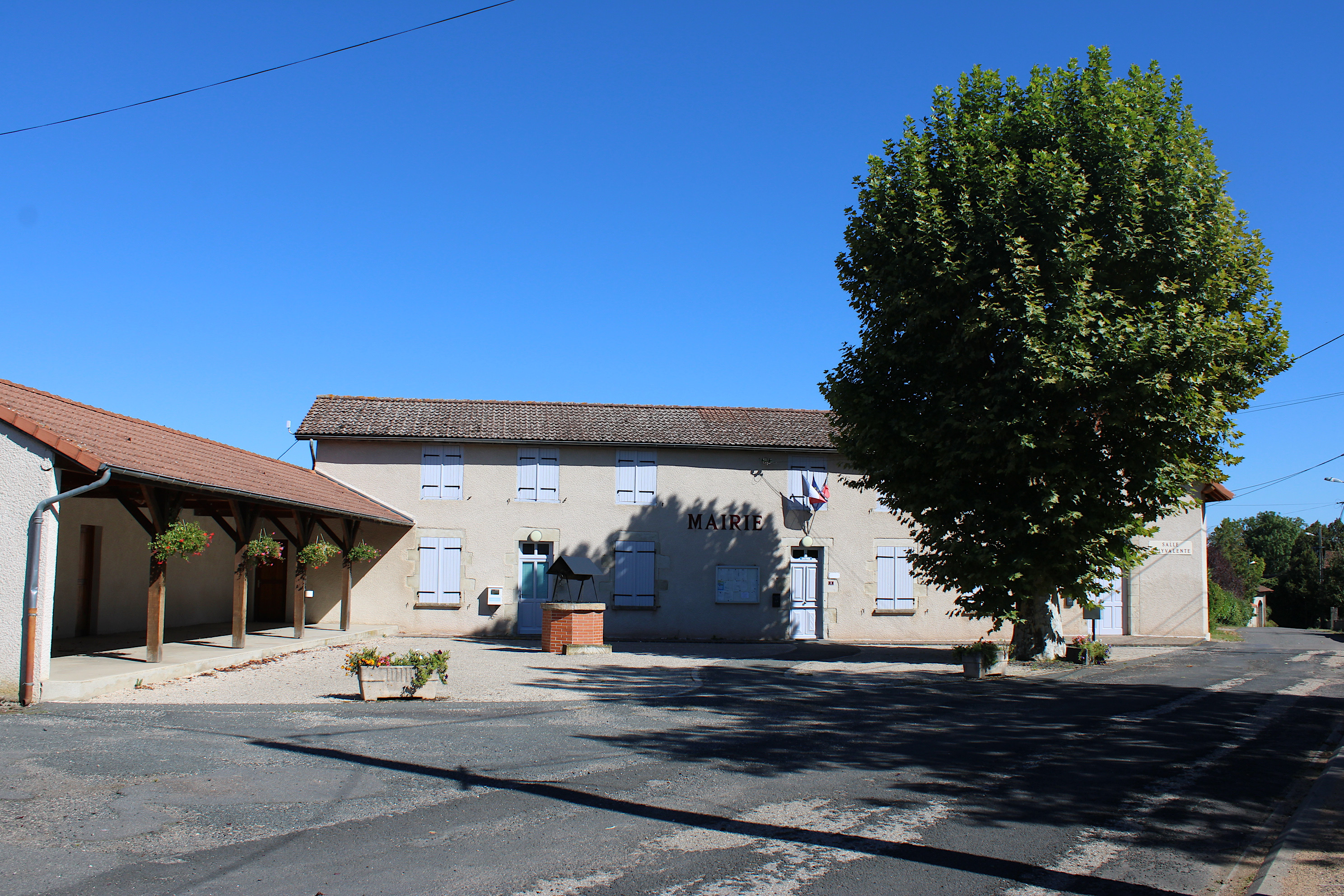
- Town hall.
- Location of Beaumont-lès-Randan
- Location within France Location within Auvergne-Rhône-Alpes
- Coordinates: 45°59′52″N 3°23′07″E
- Country: France
- Region: Auvergne-Rhône-Alpes
- Department: Puy-de-Dôme
- Arrondissement: Riom
- Canton: Maringues
- Intercommunality: Plaine Limagne

Government
  - Mayor (2026–32): Florence Leblond
- Area^{1}: 5.99 km^{2} (2.31 sq mi)
- Elevation: 340 m (1,120 ft)
- Highest elevation: 381 m (1,250 ft)
- Lowest elevation: 290 m (950 ft)
- Population (2023): 312
  - Density: 52.1/km^{2} (135/sq mi)
- Time zone: UTC+01:00 (CET)
  - Summer (DST): UTC+02:00 (CEST)
- INSEE/Postal code: 63033 /63310
- ^{1} French Land Register data, which excludes lakes, ponds, glaciers > 1 km^{2} (0.386 sq mi or 247 acres) and river estuaries.

Beaumont-lès-Randan (French pronunciation: [bomɔ̃ lɛ ʁɑ̃dɑ̃], literally Beaumont near Randan; Occitan: Biaumont de Randans) is a commune in the Puy-de-Dôme department in Auvergne-Rhône-Alpes in central France.

== Population ==
Historical population
Year	Pop.	±% p.a.
1968	188	—
1975	167	−1.68%
1982	176	+0.75%
1990	157	−1.42%
1999	192	+2.26%
2007	239	+2.77%
2012	273	+2.70%
2017	295	+1.56%
2023	312	+0.94%
Source: INSEE

== See also ==
- Communes of the Puy-de-Dôme department
