= Villeneuve-les-Cerfs =

- Commune
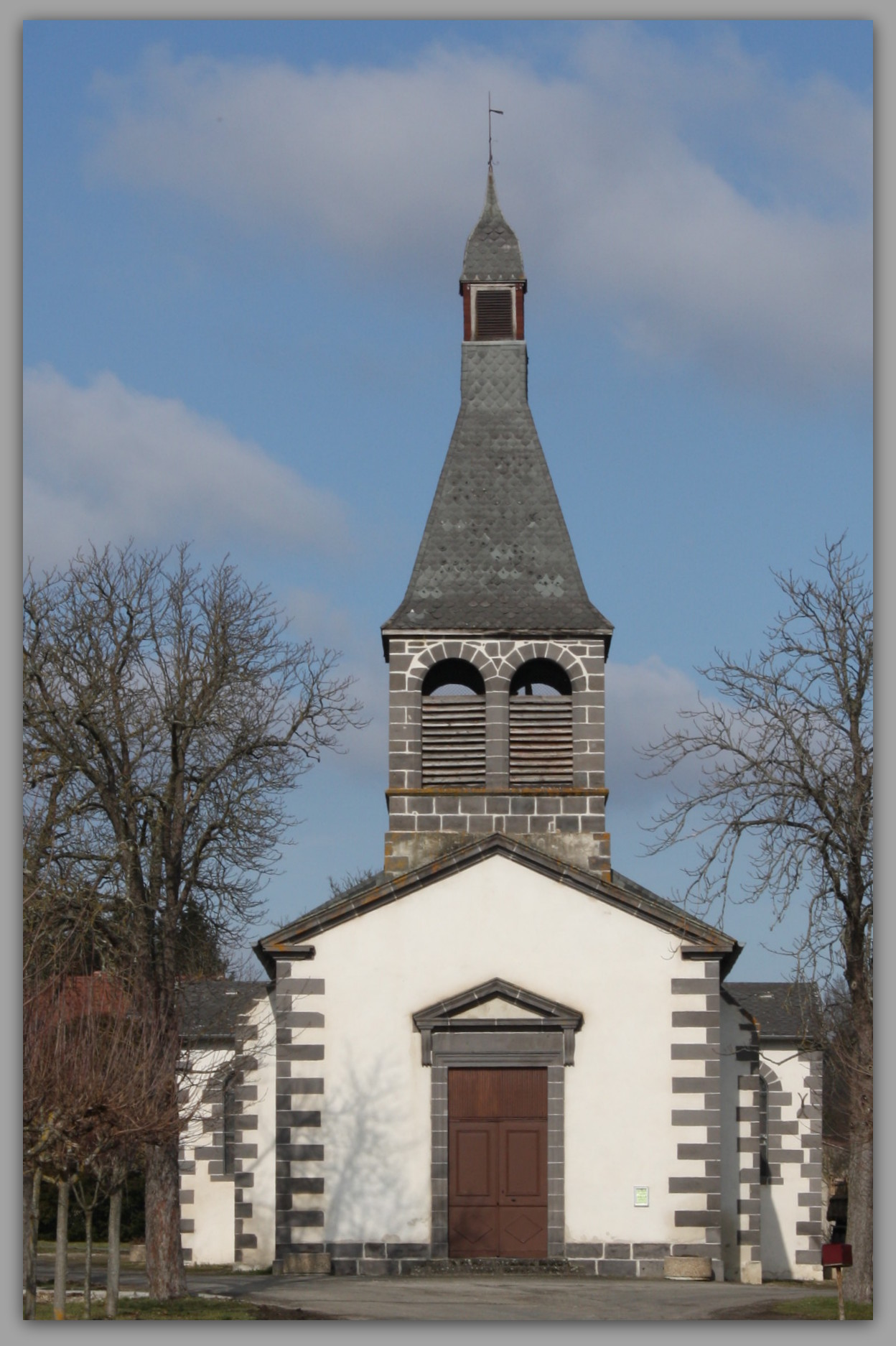
- The church in Villeneuve-les-Cerfs

- Coat of arms
- Location of Villeneuve-les-Cerfs
- Location within France Location within Auvergne-Rhône-Alpes
- Coordinates: 46°00′36″N 3°19′52″E
- Country: France
- Region: Auvergne-Rhône-Alpes
- Department: Puy-de-Dôme
- Arrondissement: Riom
- Canton: Maringues

Government
  - Mayor (2020–2026): Roland Genestier
- Area^{1}: 9.89 km^{2} (3.82 sq mi)
- Elevation: 354 m (1,161 ft)
- Highest elevation: 401 m (1,316 ft)
- Lowest elevation: 311 m (1,020 ft)
- Population (2023): 514
  - Density: 52.0/km^{2} (135/sq mi)
- Time zone: UTC+01:00 (CET)
  - Summer (DST): UTC+02:00 (CEST)
- INSEE/Postal code: 63459 /63310
- ^{1} French Land Register data, which excludes lakes, ponds, glaciers > 1 km^{2} (0.386 sq mi or 247 acres) and river estuaries.

Villeneuve-les-Cerfs (French pronunciation: [vilnœv le sɛʁ]; Occitan: Vilanòva) is a commune in the Puy-de-Dôme department in Auvergne in central France.

== See also ==
- Communes of the Puy-de-Dôme department
