= Saint-Denis-Combarnazat =

- Commune
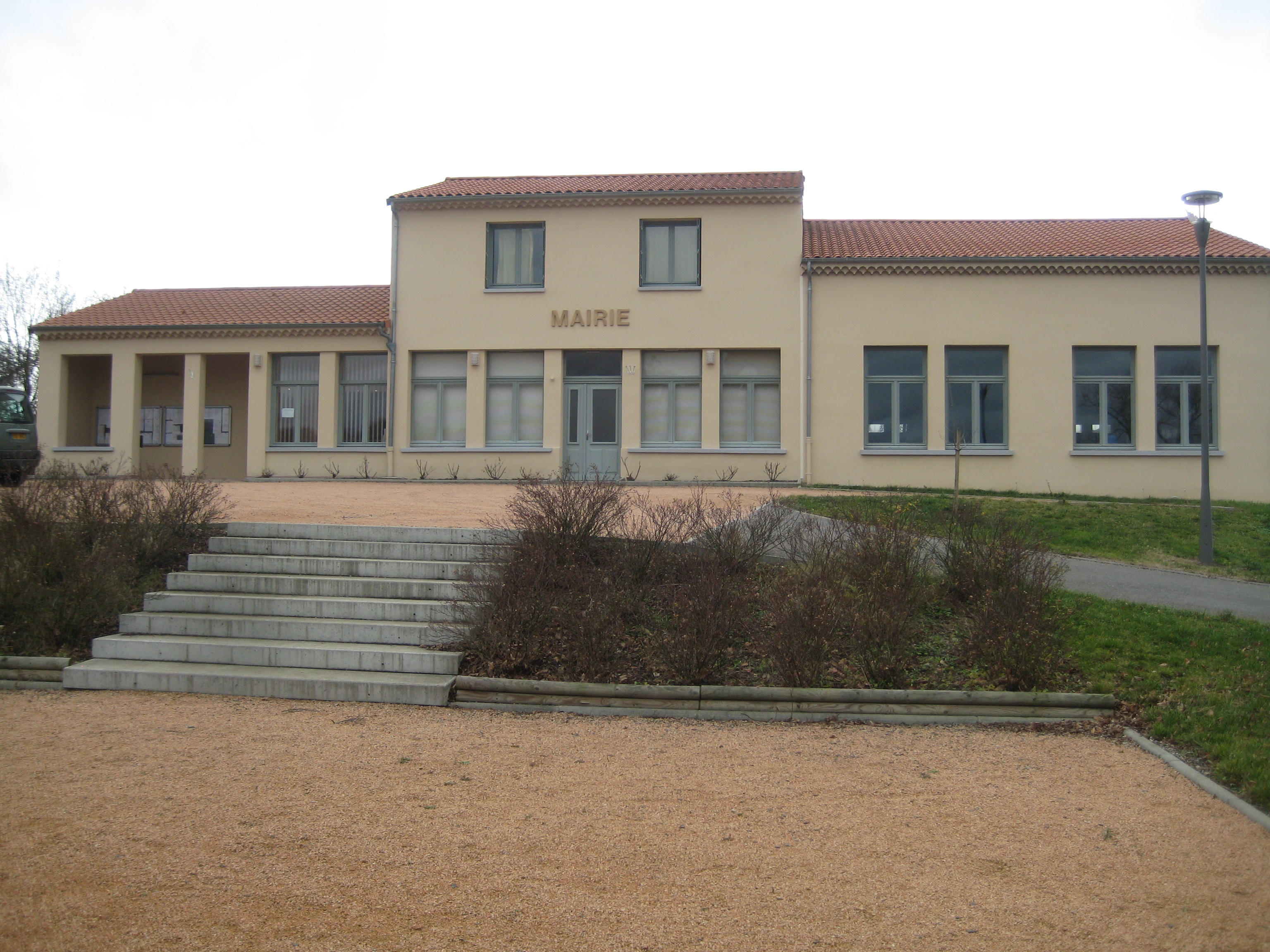
- The town hall in Saint-Denis-Combarnazat
- Location of Saint-Denis-Combarnazat
- Location within France Location within Auvergne-Rhône-Alpes
- Coordinates: 45°58′59″N 3°21′00″E
- Country: France
- Region: Auvergne-Rhône-Alpes
- Department: Puy-de-Dôme
- Arrondissement: Riom
- Canton: Maringues
- Area^{1}: 10.21 km^{2} (3.94 sq mi)
- Elevation: 338 m (1,109 ft)
- Highest elevation: 407 m (1,335 ft)
- Lowest elevation: 300 m (980 ft)
- Population (2023): 248
  - Density: 24.3/km^{2} (62.9/sq mi)
- Time zone: UTC+01:00 (CET)
  - Summer (DST): UTC+02:00 (CEST)
- INSEE/Postal code: 63333 /63310
- ^{1} French Land Register data, which excludes lakes, ponds, glaciers > 1 km^{2} (0.386 sq mi or 247 acres) and river estuaries.

Saint-Denis-Combarnazat (French pronunciation: [sɛ̃ dəni kɔ̃baʁnaza]; Auvergnat: Sent Danís de Combarnasac) is a commune in the Puy-de-Dôme department in Auvergne in central France.

== See also ==
- Communes of the Puy-de-Dôme department
