= Saint-Clément-de-Régnat =

- Commune
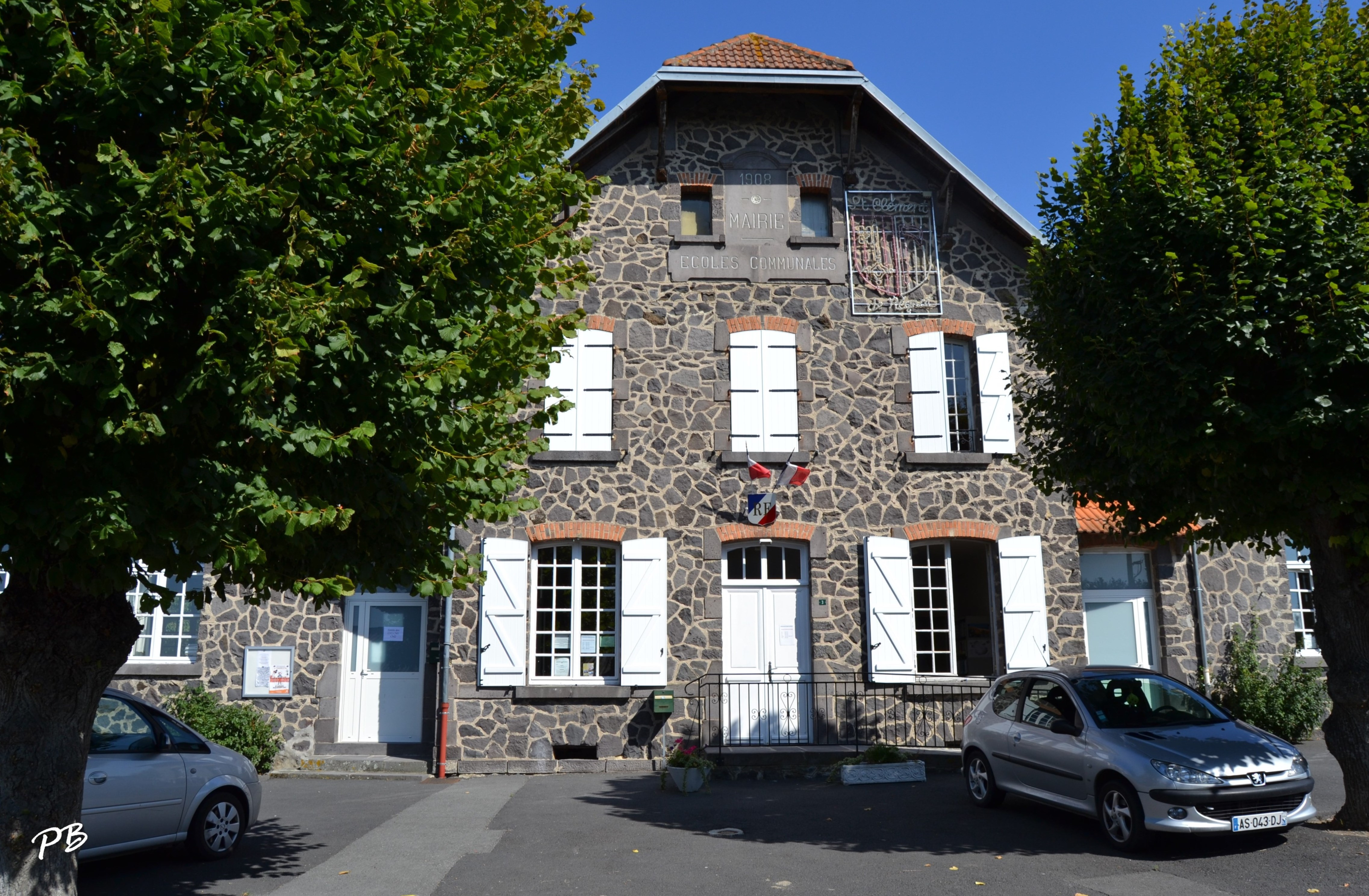
- The town hall in Saint-Clément-de-Régnat

- Coat of arms
- Location of Saint-Clément-de-Régnat
- Location within France Location within Auvergne-Rhône-Alpes
- Coordinates: 46°00′04″N 3°17′51″E
- Country: France
- Region: Auvergne-Rhône-Alpes
- Department: Puy-de-Dôme
- Arrondissement: Riom
- Canton: Maringues
- Intercommunality: CC Plaine Limagne

Government
  - Mayor (2026–32): Rémy Petoton
- Area^{1}: 15 km^{2} (5.8 sq mi)
- Elevation: 320 m (1,050 ft)
- Highest elevation: 342 m (1,122 ft)
- Lowest elevation: 306 m (1,004 ft)
- Population (2023): 516
  - Density: 34/km^{2} (89/sq mi)
- Time zone: UTC+01:00 (CET)
  - Summer (DST): UTC+02:00 (CEST)
- INSEE/Postal code: 63332 /63310
- ^{1} French Land Register data, which excludes lakes, ponds, glaciers > 1 km^{2} (0.386 sq mi or 247 acres) and river estuaries.

Saint-Clément-de-Régnat (French pronunciation: [sɛ̃ klemɑ̃ də ʁeɲa]; Auvergnat: Sent Clemenç de Valòrja) is a commune in the Puy-de-Dôme department in Auvergne in central France.

== See also ==
- Communes of the Puy-de-Dôme department
