= Canton of Maringues =

Coordinates: 45.92°N 3.33°E

The canton of Maringues is an administrative division of the Puy-de-Dôme department, central France. Its borders were modified at the French canton reorganisation which came into effect in March 2015. Its seat is in Maringues.

It consists of the following communes:

1. Bas-et-Lezat
2. Beaumont-lès-Randan
3. Charnat
4. Châteldon
5. Lachaux
6. Limons
7. Luzillat
8. Maringues
9. Mons
10. Noalhat
11. Paslières
12. Puy-Guillaume
13. Randan
14. Ris
15. Saint-André-le-Coq
16. Saint-Clément-de-Régnat
17. Saint-Denis-Combarnazat
18. Saint-Priest-Bramefant
19. Saint-Sylvestre-Pragoulin
20. Villeneuve-les-Cerfs
