= Saint-Priest-Bramefant =

- Commune
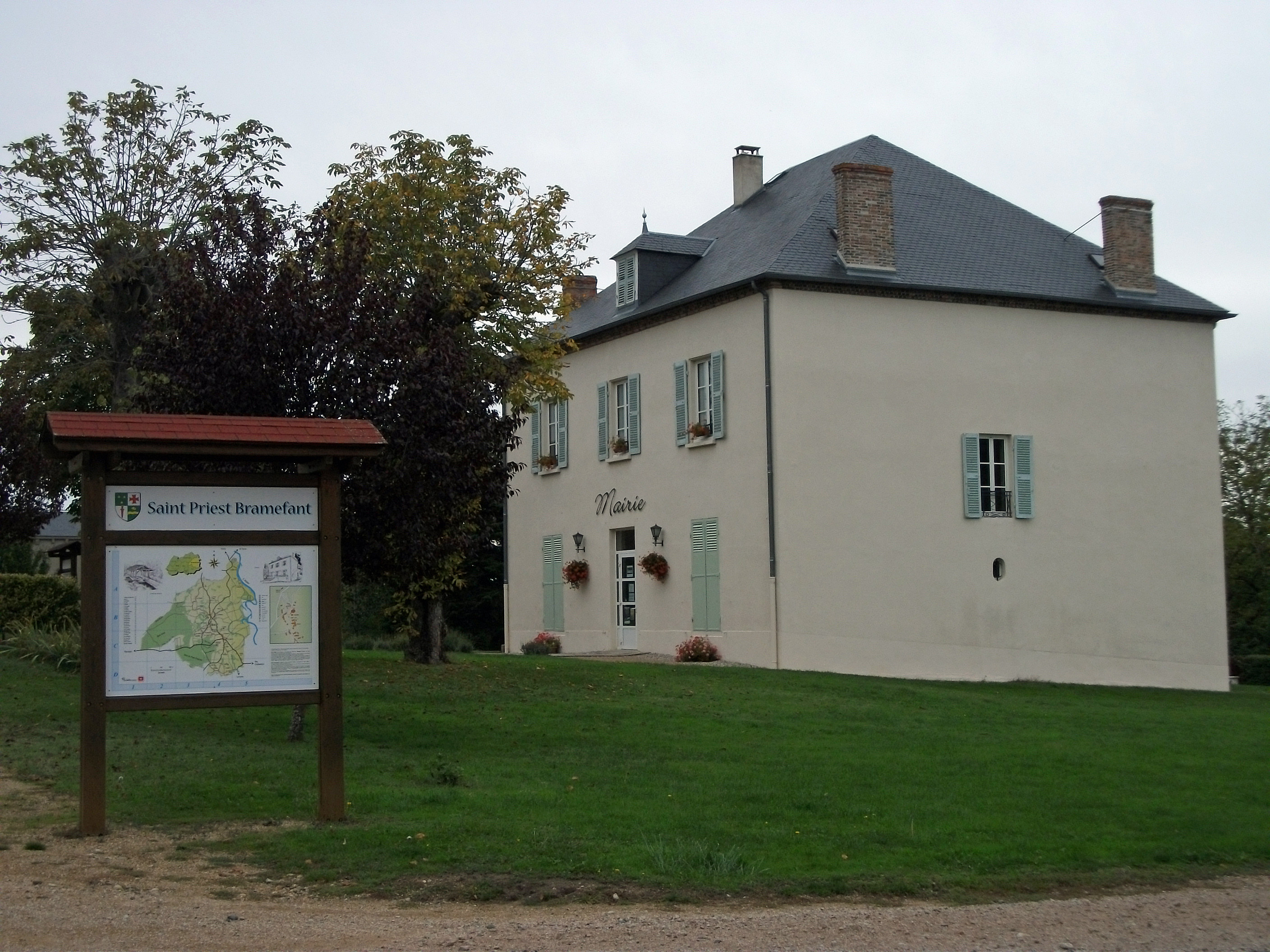
- The town hall in Saint-Priest-Bramefant

- Coat of arms
- Location of Saint-Priest-Bramefant
- Location within France Location within Auvergne-Rhône-Alpes
- Coordinates: 46°01′44″N 3°26′28″E
- Country: France
- Region: Auvergne-Rhône-Alpes
- Department: Puy-de-Dôme
- Arrondissement: Riom
- Canton: Maringues
- Intercommunality: Plaine Limagne

Government
  - Mayor (2020–2026): Michel Gaume
- Area^{1}: 19.06 km^{2} (7.36 sq mi)
- Elevation: 264 m (866 ft)
- Highest elevation: 373 m (1,224 ft)
- Lowest elevation: 256 m (840 ft)
- Population (2023): 871
  - Density: 45.7/km^{2} (118/sq mi)
- Time zone: UTC+01:00 (CET)
  - Summer (DST): UTC+02:00 (CEST)
- INSEE/Postal code: 63387 /63310
- ^{1} French Land Register data, which excludes lakes, ponds, glaciers > 1 km^{2} (0.386 sq mi or 247 acres) and river estuaries.

Saint-Priest-Bramefant (French pronunciation: [sɛ̃ pʁi(jɛst) bʁamfɑ̃]; Occitan: Sent Priest de Bramafam) is a commune in the Puy-de-Dôme department in Auvergne-Rhône-Alpes in central France.

== Tourism, places and monuments ==
There is a 3-stars hotel in that commune.

Main monuments :

- Château de Maulmont (16th, 19th)
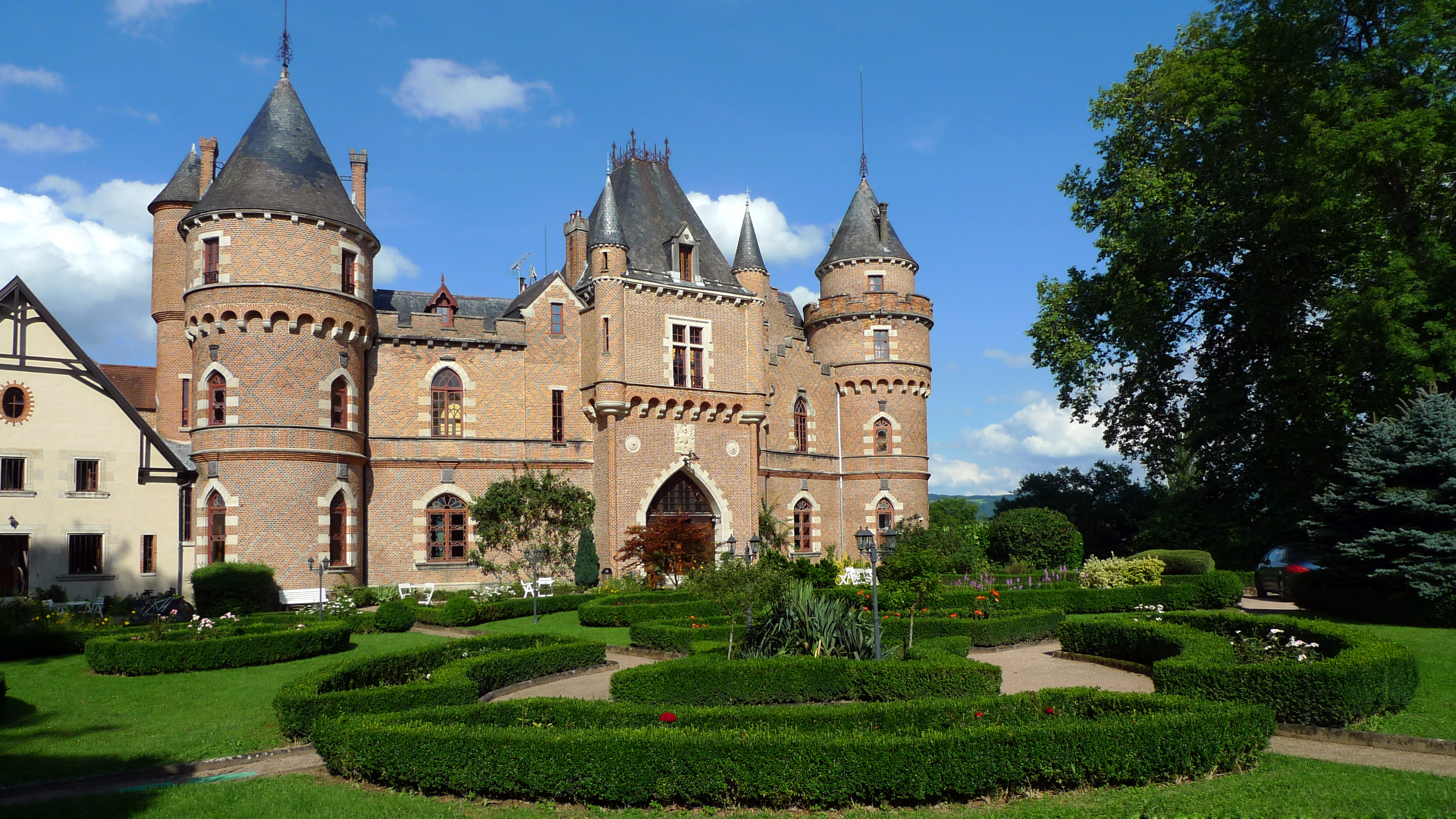
  Château de Maulmont, 3-stars hotel
- The church (Middle Age, 19th, 20th)
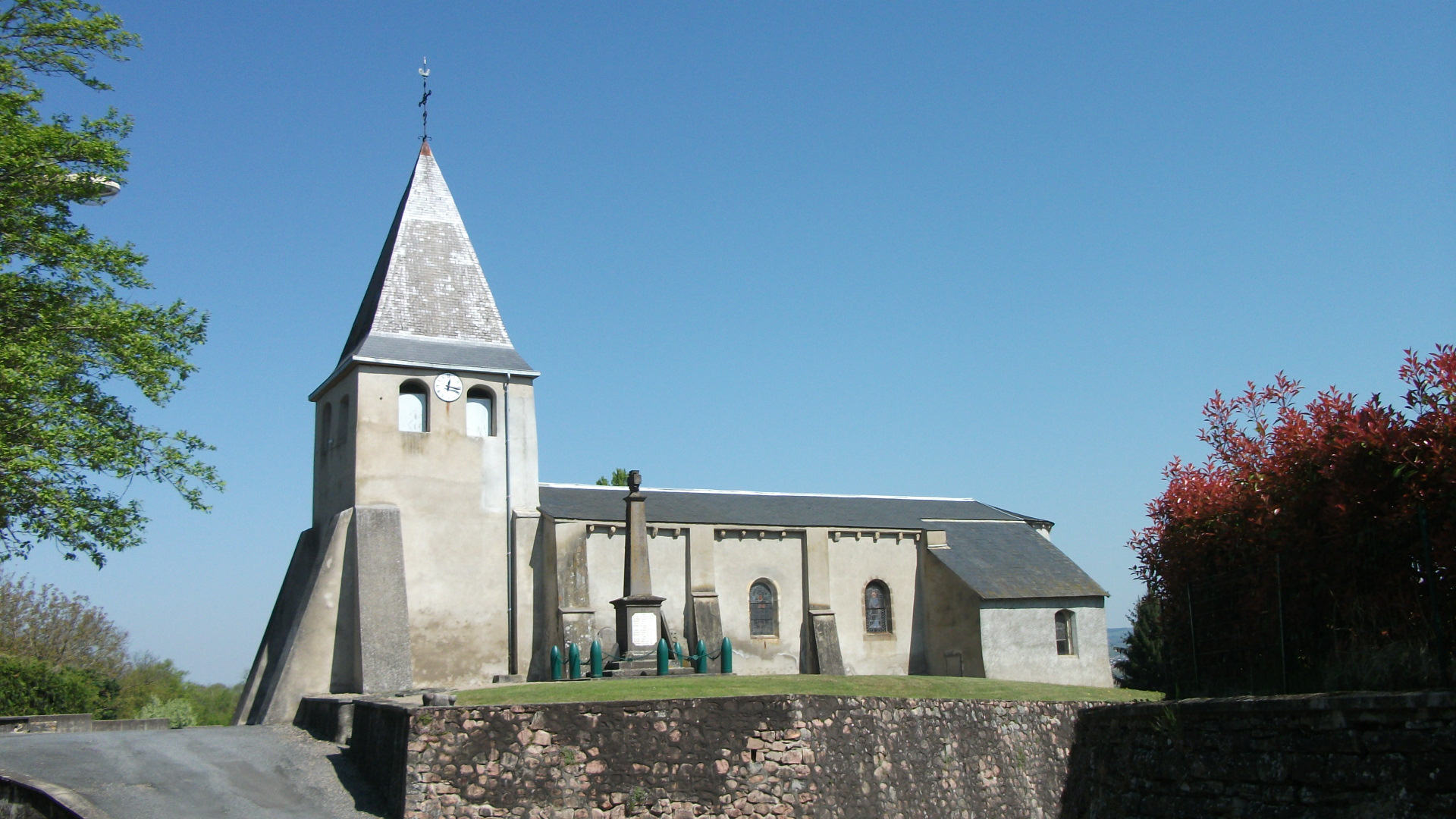
  Church

== See also ==
- Communes of the Puy-de-Dôme department
