= Limons =

- Commune
- Coat of arms
- Location of Limons
- Location within France Location within Auvergne-Rhône-Alpes
- Coordinates: 45°58′28″N 3°26′46″E
- Country: France
- Region: Auvergne-Rhône-Alpes
- Department: Puy-de-Dôme
- Arrondissement: Riom
- Canton: Maringues
- Intercommunality: CC Plaine Limagne

Government
  - Mayor (2026–32): Matéo Morel
- Area^{1}: 14.88 km^{2} (5.75 sq mi)
- Highest elevation: 305 m (1,001 ft)
- Lowest elevation: 262 m (860 ft)
- Population (2023): 721
  - Density: 48.5/km^{2} (125/sq mi)
- Time zone: UTC+01:00 (CET)
  - Summer (DST): UTC+02:00 (CEST)
- INSEE/Postal code: 63196 /63290
- ^{1} French Land Register data, which excludes lakes, ponds, glaciers > 1 km^{2} (0.386 sq mi or 247 acres) and river estuaries.

Limons (French pronunciation: [limɔ̃]) is a commune in the Puy-de-Dôme department in Auvergne in central France.

== See also ==
- Communes of the Puy-de-Dôme department
