= Mons, Puy-de-Dôme =

Mons
- Commune
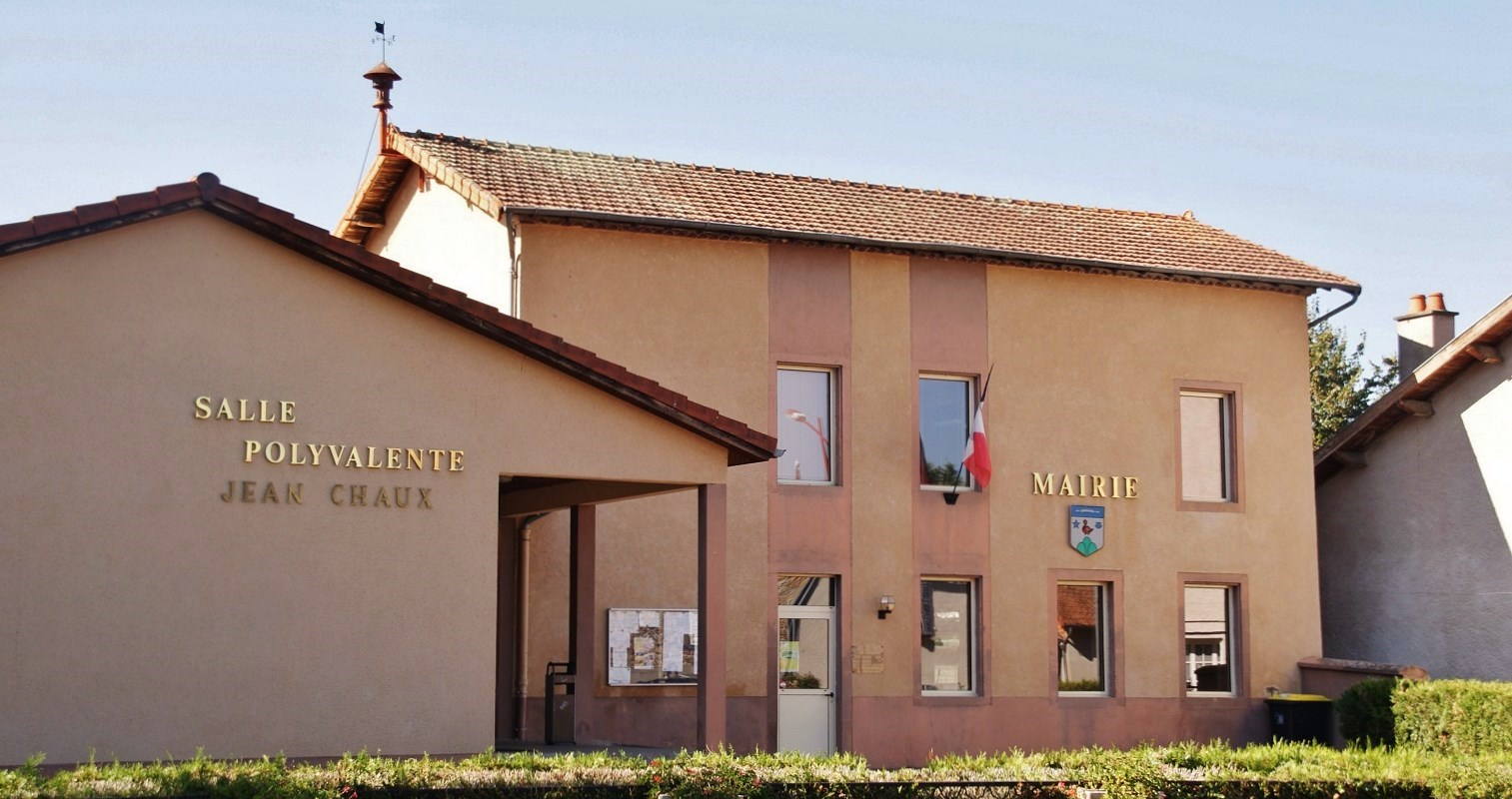
- The town hall in Mons

- Coat of arms
- Location of Mons
- Location within France Location within Auvergne-Rhône-Alpes
- Coordinates: 46°00′10″N 3°25′02″E
- Country: France
- Region: Auvergne-Rhône-Alpes
- Department: Puy-de-Dôme
- Arrondissement: Riom
- Canton: Maringues
- Intercommunality: CC Plaine Limagne

Government
  - Mayor (2026–32): Didier Chassain
- Area^{1}: 13.82 km^{2} (5.34 sq mi)
- Elevation: 331 m (1,086 ft)
- Highest elevation: 375 m (1,230 ft)
- Lowest elevation: 261 m (856 ft)
- Population (2023): 578
  - Density: 41.8/km^{2} (108/sq mi)
- Time zone: UTC+01:00 (CET)
  - Summer (DST): UTC+02:00 (CEST)
- INSEE/Postal code: 63232 /63310
- ^{1} French Land Register data, which excludes lakes, ponds, glaciers > 1 km^{2} (0.386 sq mi or 247 acres) and river estuaries.

Mons is a commune in the Puy-de-Dôme department in Auvergne in central France.

== See also ==
- Communes of the Puy-de-Dôme department
