= Canton of Vichy-2 =

Coordinates: 46.12°N 3.43°E

- Canton
- Situation of the canton of Vichy-2 in the department of Allier
- Country: France
- Region: Auvergne-Rhône-Alpes
- Department: Allier
- No. of communes: {{{nbcomm}}}
- Population (2023): 18,684
- INSEE code: 0318

The canton of Vichy-2 is an administrative division of the Allier department, in central France. It was created at the French canton reorganisation which came into effect in March 2015. Its seat is in Vichy.

It consists of the following communes:

1. Abrest
2. Saint-Yorre
3. Vichy (partly)
