= Charnat =

- Commune
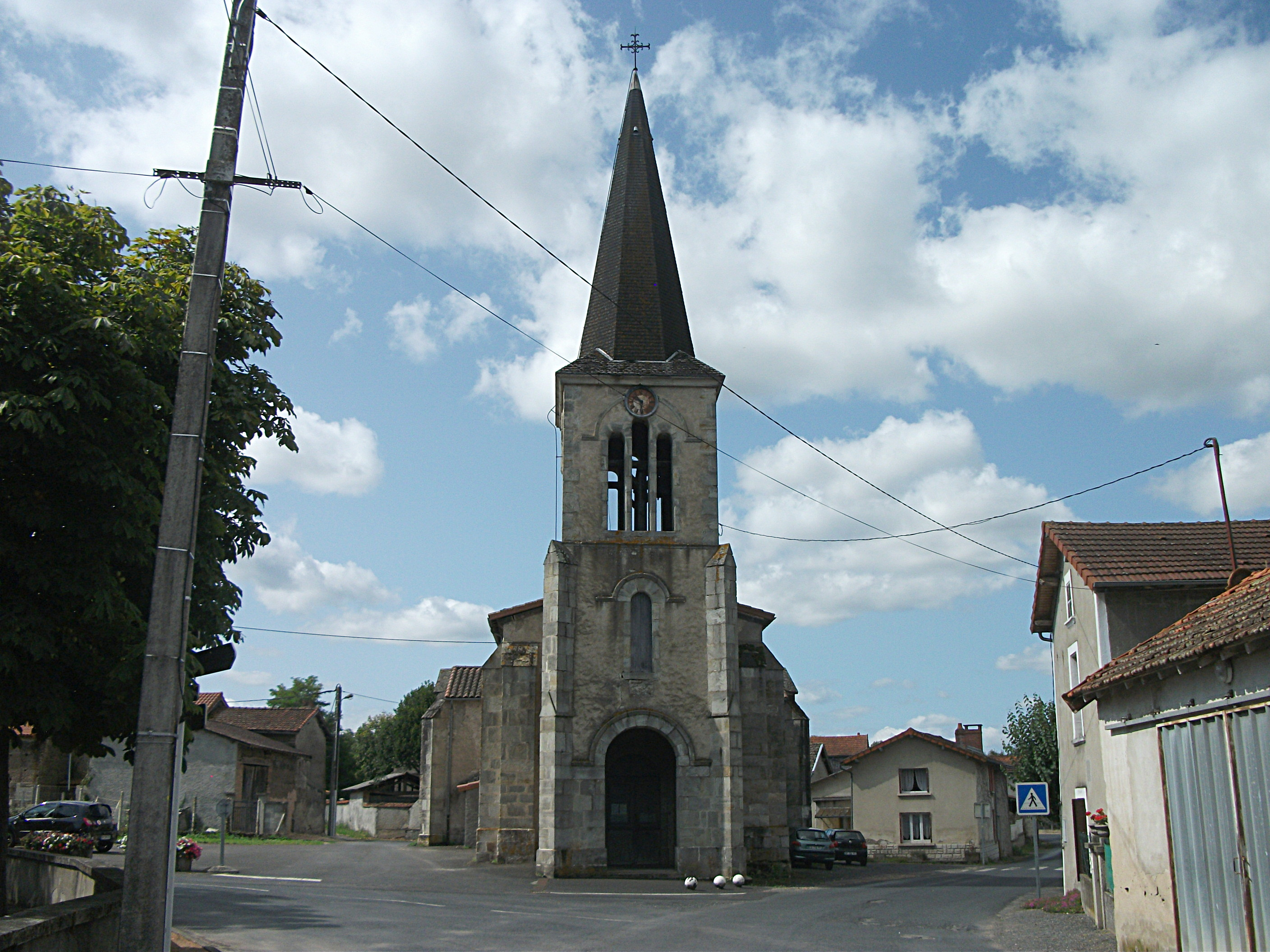
- Church

- Coat of arms
- Location of Charnat
- Location within France Location within Auvergne-Rhône-Alpes
- Coordinates: 45°56′38″N 3°26′01″E
- Country: France
- Region: Auvergne-Rhône-Alpes
- Department: Puy-de-Dôme
- Arrondissement: Thiers
- Canton: Maringues
- Intercommunality: Thiers Dore et Montagne

Government
  - Mayor (2026–32): Philippe Blanchoz
- Area^{1}: 5.42 km^{2} (2.09 sq mi)
- Elevation: 281 m (922 ft)
- Highest elevation: 309 m (1,014 ft)
- Lowest elevation: 273 m (896 ft)
- Population (2023): 207
  - Density: 38.2/km^{2} (98.9/sq mi)
- Time zone: UTC+01:00 (CET)
  - Summer (DST): UTC+02:00 (CEST)
- INSEE/Postal code: 63095 /63290
- ^{1} French Land Register data, which excludes lakes, ponds, glaciers > 1 km^{2} (0.386 sq mi or 247 acres) and river estuaries.

Charnat (French pronunciation: [ʃaʁna]; Occitan: Charnac) is a commune in the Puy-de-Dôme department in Auvergne-Rhône-Alpes in central France. It is part of the canton of Maringues and the communauté de communes Thiers Dore et Montagne.

== See also ==
- Communes of the Puy-de-Dôme department
