= Saint-Sylvestre-Pragoulin =

- Commune
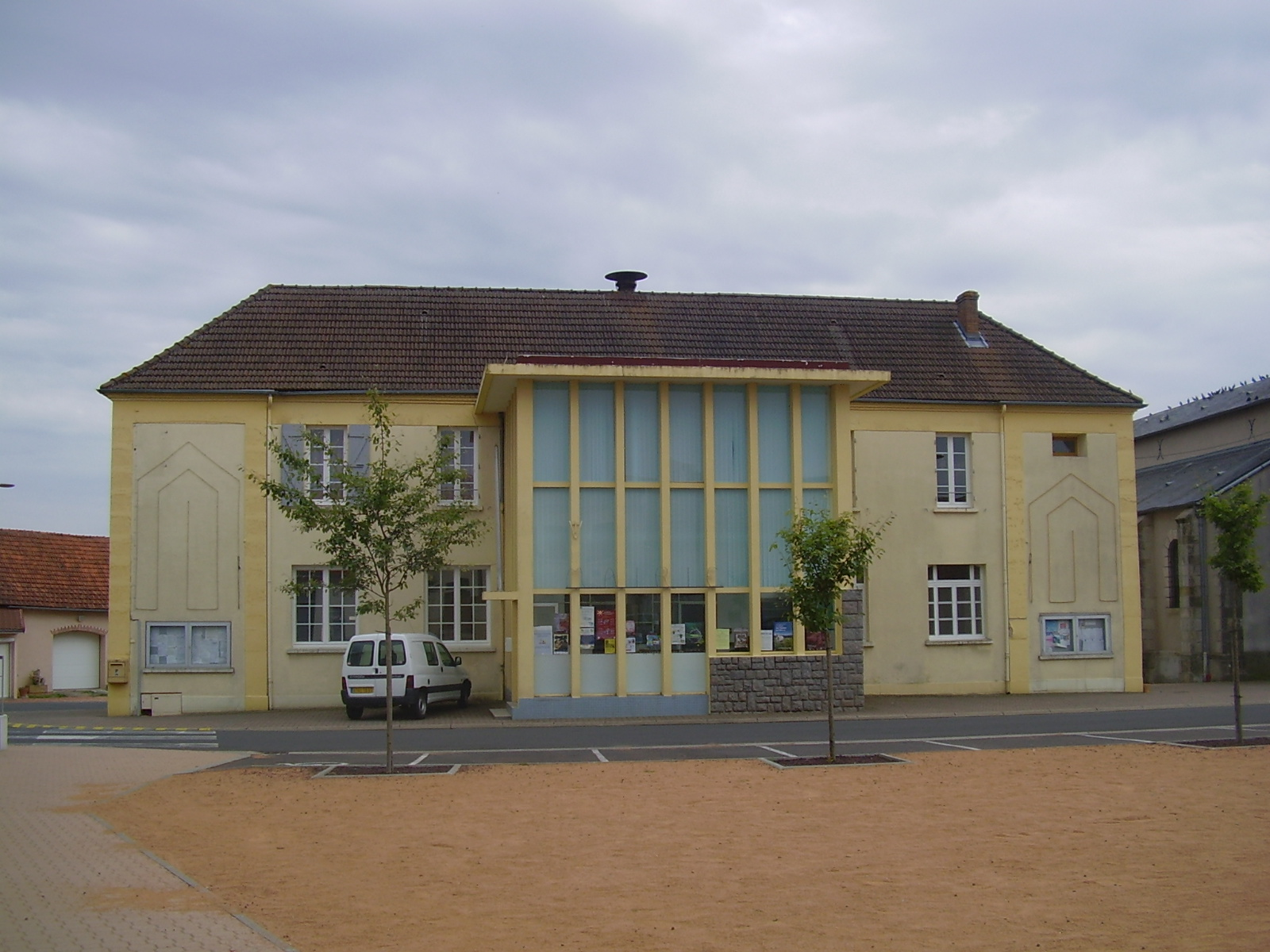
- The town hall in Saint-Sylvestre-Pragoulin
- Location of Saint-Sylvestre-Pragoulin
- Location within France Location within Auvergne-Rhône-Alpes
- Coordinates: 46°03′14″N 3°23′38″E
- Country: France
- Region: Auvergne-Rhône-Alpes
- Department: Puy-de-Dôme
- Arrondissement: Riom
- Canton: Maringues
- Intercommunality: Plaine Limagne

Government
  - Mayor (2026–32): Bernard Manillère
- Area^{1}: 23.81 km^{2} (9.19 sq mi)
- Elevation: 361 m (1,184 ft)
- Highest elevation: 397 m (1,302 ft)
- Lowest elevation: 256 m (840 ft)
- Population (2023): 1,063
  - Density: 44.65/km^{2} (115.6/sq mi)
- Time zone: UTC+01:00 (CET)
  - Summer (DST): UTC+02:00 (CEST)
- INSEE/Postal code: 63400 /63310
- ^{1} French Land Register data, which excludes lakes, ponds, glaciers > 1 km^{2} (0.386 sq mi or 247 acres) and river estuaries.

Saint-Sylvestre-Pragoulin (French pronunciation: [sɛ̃ silvɛstʁ pʁaɡulɛ̃]; Auvergnat: Sent Salvèstre e Pratgolin) is a commune in the Puy-de-Dôme department in Auvergne-Rhône-Alpes in central France.

== Demography ==
Historical population
Year	Pop.	±% p.a.
1968	826	—
1975	893	+1.12%
1982	982	+1.37%
1990	1,102	+1.45%
1999	1,079	−0.23%
2007	1,079	+0.00%
2012	1,087	+0.15%
2017	1,085	−0.04%
2023	1,063	−0.34%
Source: INSEE

== See also ==
- Communes of the Puy-de-Dôme department
