= Noalhat =

- Commune
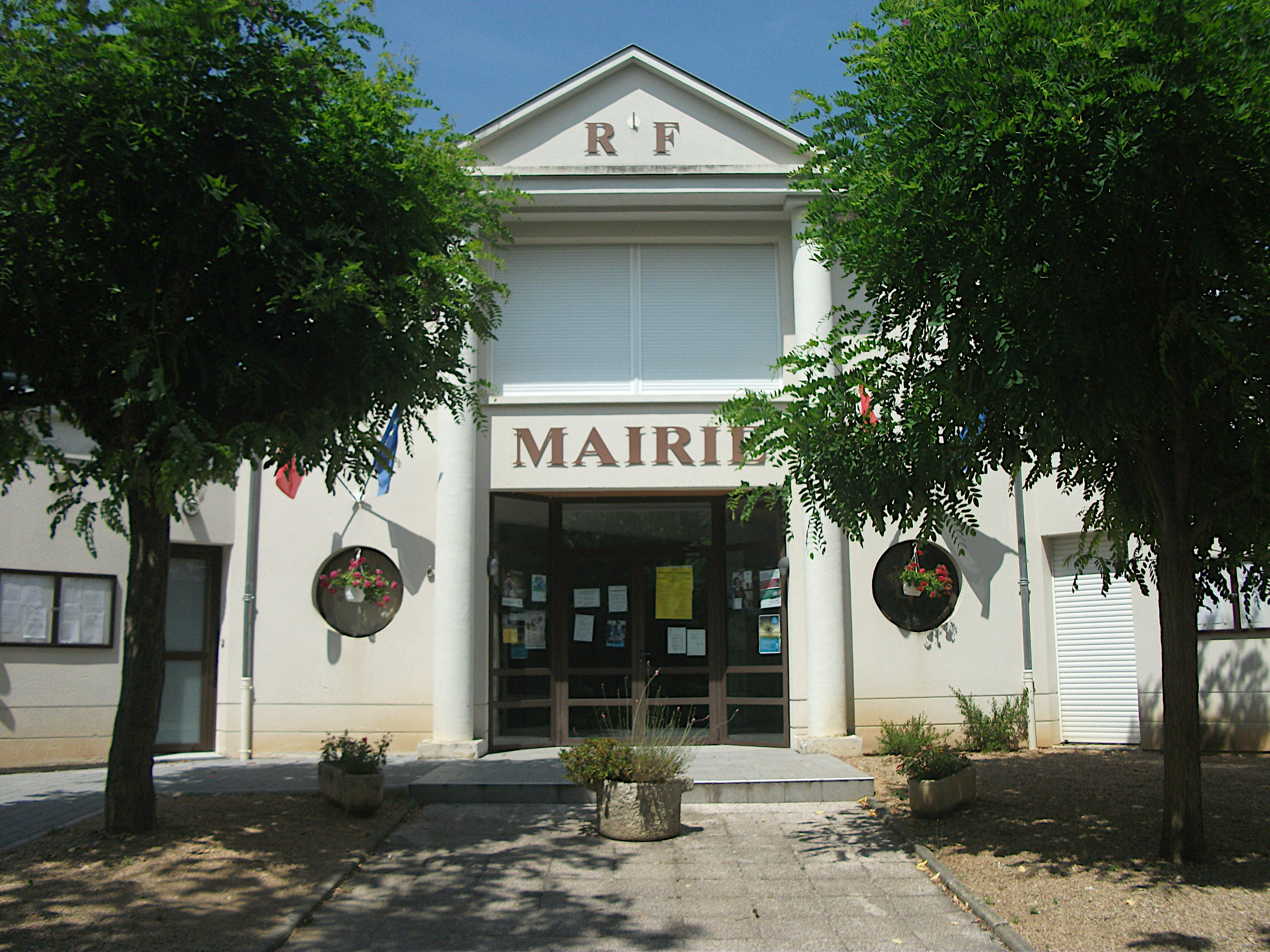
- Town hall

- Coat of arms
- Location of Noalhat
- Location within France Location within Auvergne-Rhône-Alpes
- Coordinates: 45°54′54″N 3°27′22″E
- Country: France
- Region: Auvergne-Rhône-Alpes
- Department: Puy-de-Dôme
- Arrondissement: Thiers
- Canton: Maringues
- Intercommunality: Thiers Dore et Montagne

Government
  - Mayor (2026–32): Ludovic Dassaud
- Area^{1}: 5.13 km^{2} (1.98 sq mi)
- Elevation: 290 m (950 ft)
- Highest elevation: 356 m (1,168 ft)
- Lowest elevation: 275 m (902 ft)
- Population (2023): 228
  - Density: 44.4/km^{2} (115/sq mi)
- Time zone: UTC+01:00 (CET)
  - Summer (DST): UTC+02:00 (CEST)
- INSEE/Postal code: 63253 /63290
- ^{1} French Land Register data, which excludes lakes, ponds, glaciers > 1 km^{2} (0.386 sq mi or 247 acres) and river estuaries.

Noalhat is a commune in the Puy-de-Dôme department in Auvergne-Rhône-Alpes in central France.

== See also ==
- Communes of the Puy-de-Dôme department
