= Bas-et-Lezat =

- Commune
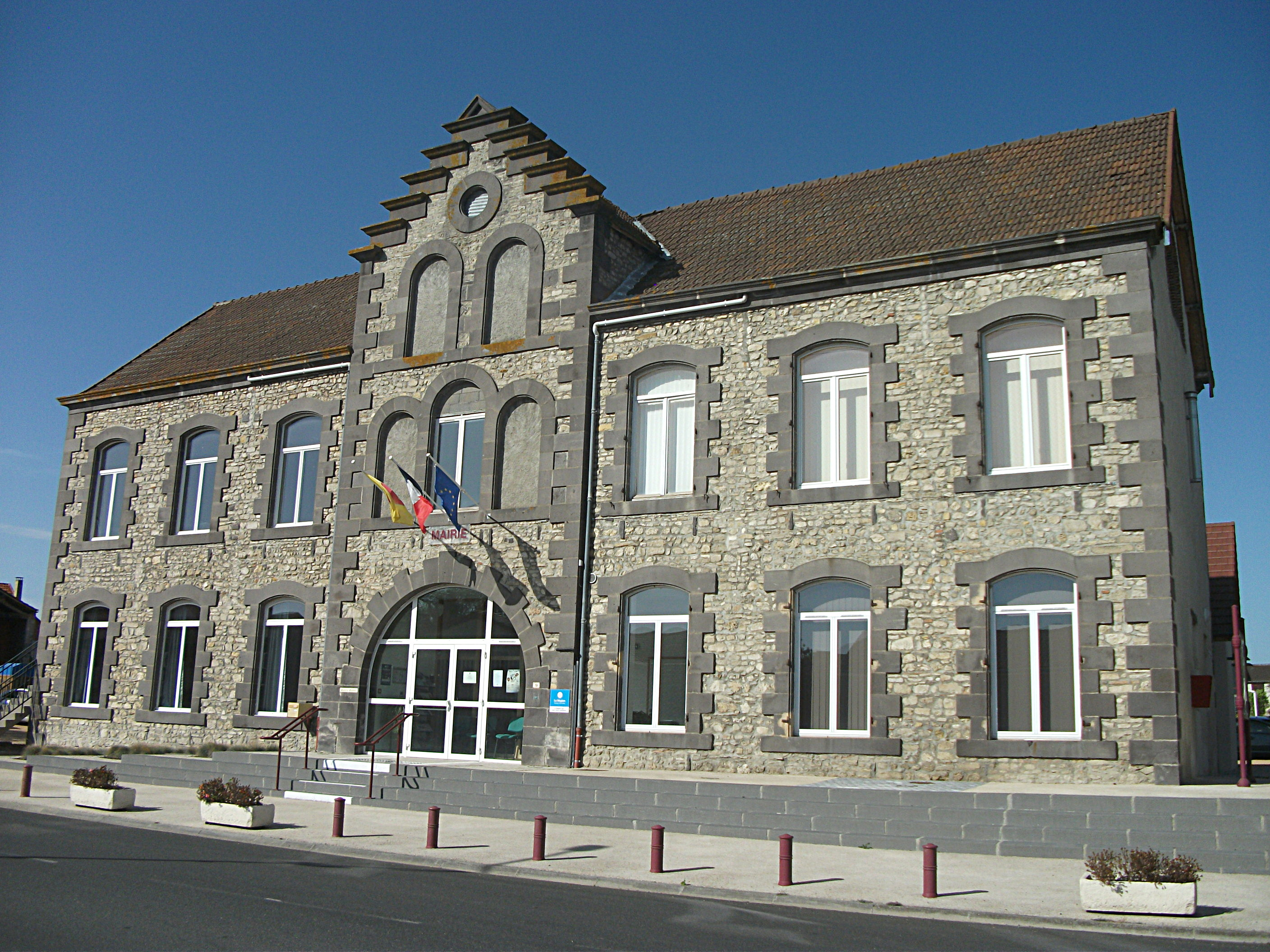
- Town hall

- Coat of arms
- Location of Bas-et-Lezat
- Location within France Location within Auvergne-Rhône-Alpes
- Coordinates: 46°01′32″N 3°18′03″E
- Country: France
- Region: Auvergne-Rhône-Alpes
- Department: Puy-de-Dôme
- Arrondissement: Riom
- Canton: Maringues
- Intercommunality: Plaine Limagne

Government
  - Mayor (2026–32): Claude Denier
- Area^{1}: 12.59 km^{2} (4.86 sq mi)
- Elevation: 330 m (1,080 ft)
- Highest elevation: 393 m (1,289 ft)
- Lowest elevation: 317 m (1,040 ft)
- Population (2023): 352
  - Density: 28.0/km^{2} (72.4/sq mi)
- Time zone: UTC+01:00 (CET)
  - Summer (DST): UTC+02:00 (CEST)
- INSEE/Postal code: 63030 /63310
- ^{1} French Land Register data, which excludes lakes, ponds, glaciers > 1 km^{2} (0.386 sq mi or 247 acres) and river estuaries.

Bas-et-Lezat is a commune in the Puy-de-Dôme department in Auvergne-Rhône-Alpes in central France.

== Population ==
Historical population
Year	Pop.	±% p.a.
1968	214	—
1975	210	−0.27%
1982	205	−0.34%
1990	185	−1.27%
1999	209	+1.36%
2007	245	+2.01%
2012	279	+2.63%
2017	333	+3.60%
2023	352	+0.93%
Source: INSEE

== See also ==
- Communes of the Puy-de-Dôme department
