= Maringues =

- Commune
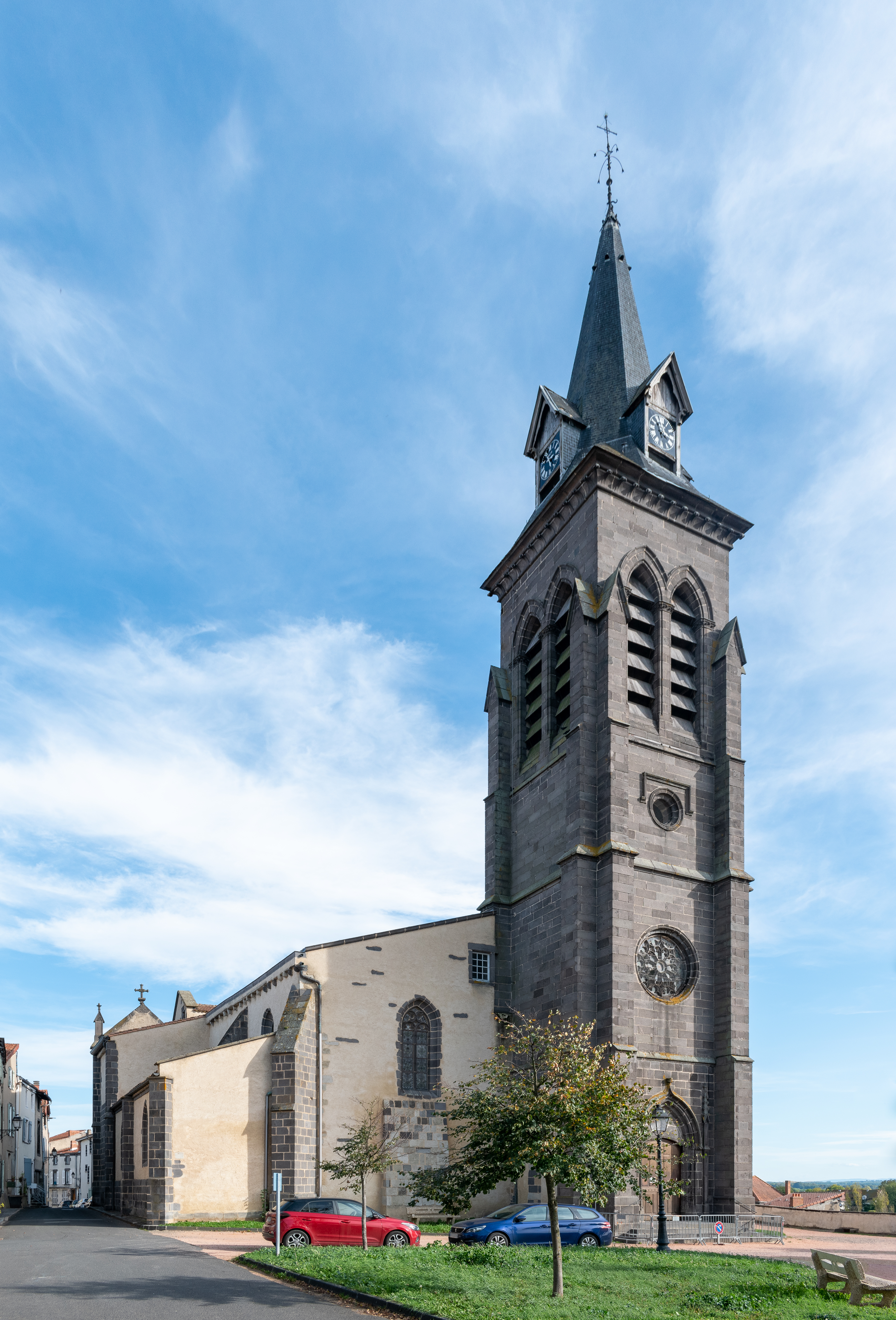
- The church in Maringues

- Coat of arms
- Location of Maringues
- Location within France Location within Auvergne-Rhône-Alpes
- Coordinates: 45°55′21″N 3°19′52″E
- Country: France
- Region: Auvergne-Rhône-Alpes
- Department: Puy-de-Dôme
- Arrondissement: Riom
- Canton: Maringues
- Intercommunality: CC Plaine Limagne

Government
  - Mayor (2026–32): Denis Beauvais
- Area^{1}: 22.11 km^{2} (8.54 sq mi)
- Highest elevation: 387 m (1,270 ft)
- Lowest elevation: 279 m (915 ft)
- Population (2023): 3,141
  - Density: 142.1/km^{2} (367.9/sq mi)
- Time zone: UTC+01:00 (CET)
  - Summer (DST): UTC+02:00 (CEST)
- INSEE/Postal code: 63210 /63350
- ^{1} French Land Register data, which excludes lakes, ponds, glaciers > 1 km^{2} (0.386 sq mi or 247 acres) and river estuaries.

Maringues (French pronunciation: [maʁɛ̃ɡ]; Occitan: Maringas) is a commune in the Puy-de-Dôme department in Auvergne-Rhône-Alpes in central France.

== Population ==
Historical population
Year	Pop.	±% p.a.
1968	2,152	—
1975	2,158	+0.04%
1982	2,351	+1.23%
1990	2,345	−0.03%
1999	2,504	+0.73%
2007	2,635	+0.64%
2012	2,776	+1.05%
2017	3,154	+2.59%
2023	3,141	−0.07%
Source: INSEE

== See also ==
- Communes of the Puy-de-Dôme department
