= Parc floral et arboré de la Chènevière =

Park with flower gardens and arboretum in Auvergne, France

Coordinates: 46°05′58″N 3°26′43″E

The Parc floral et arboré de la Chènevière is a privately owned park with flower gardens and arboretum located at La Chènevière, 106, route de Quinssat, Abrest, Allier, Auvergne, France. It is open several days per week in the warmer months.

The park contains more than 1500 varieties of flowers and trees, set within terraced and themed gardens on the foothills of Bourbonnaise mountain overlooking the Allier valley. It includes exotic trees such as Cryptomeria japonica 'cristata'.

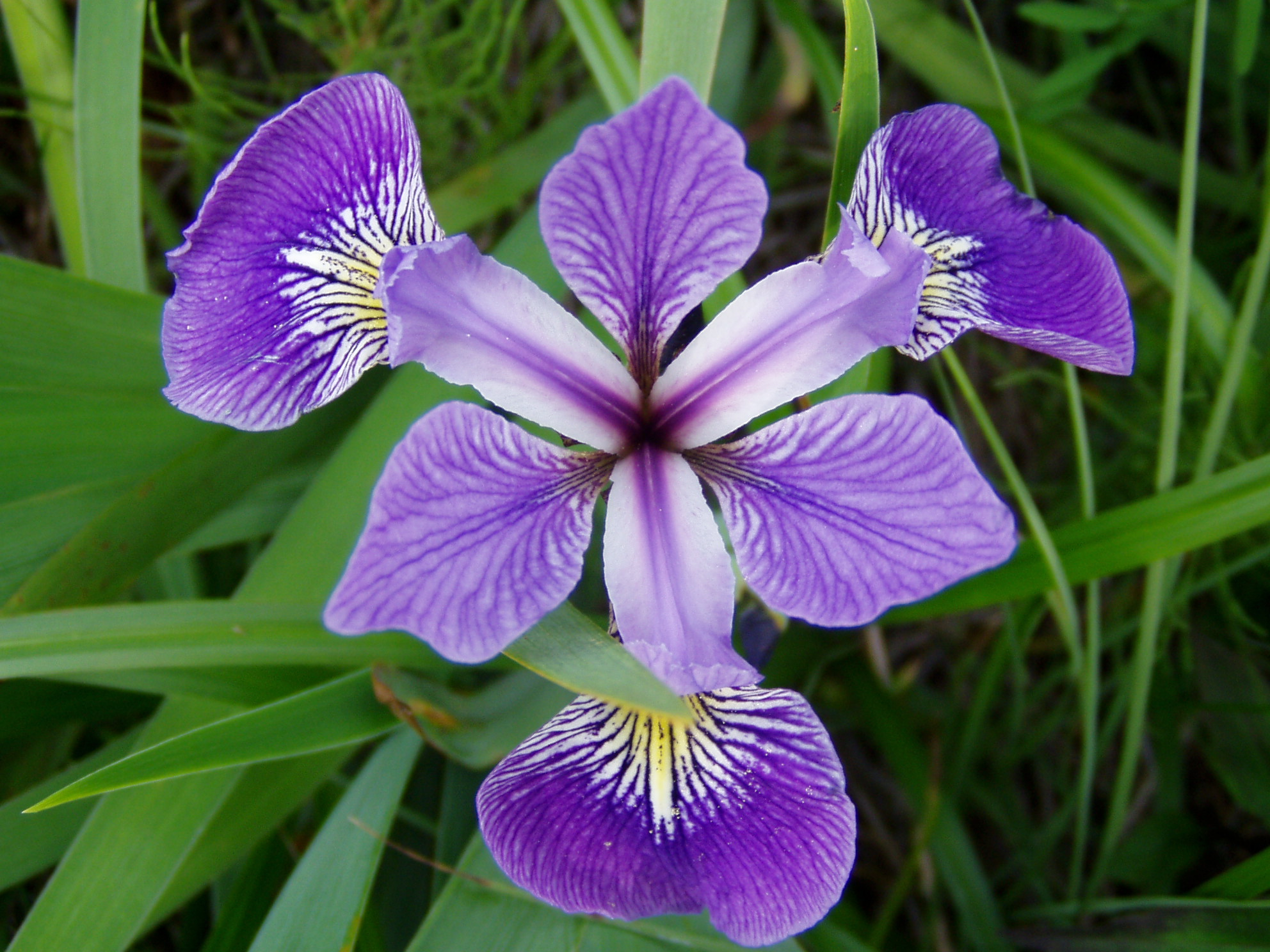
Parc floral et arboré de la Chènevière

== See also ==
- List of botanical gardens in France
