= Saint-Yorre =

- Commune
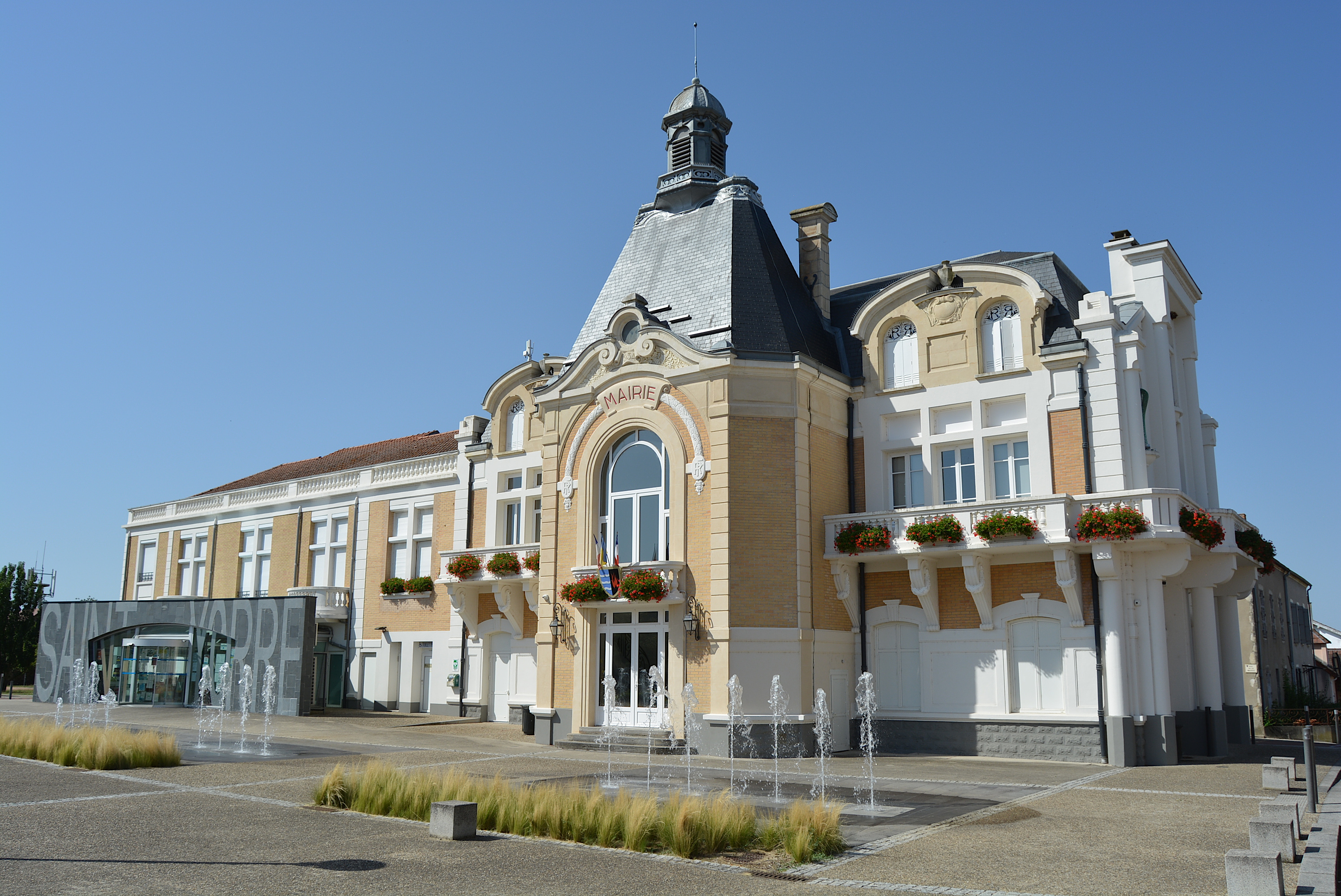
- The town hall in Saint-Yorre

- Coat of arms
- Location of Saint-Yorre
- Location within France Location within Auvergne-Rhône-Alpes
- Coordinates: 46°04′01″N 3°27′54″E
- Country: France
- Region: Auvergne-Rhône-Alpes
- Department: Allier
- Arrondissement: Vichy
- Canton: Vichy-2
- Intercommunality: CA Vichy Communauté

Government
  - Mayor (2026–32): Joseph Kuchna
- Area^{1}: 6.35 km^{2} (2.45 sq mi)
- Elevation: 266 m (873 ft)
- Highest elevation: 325 m (1,066 ft)
- Lowest elevation: 258 m (846 ft)
- Population (2023): 2,641
  - Density: 416/km^{2} (1,080/sq mi)
- Time zone: UTC+01:00 (CET)
  - Summer (DST): UTC+02:00 (CEST)
- INSEE/Postal code: 03264 /03270
- Website: ville-saint-yorre.fr
- ^{1} French Land Register data, which excludes lakes, ponds, glaciers > 1 km^{2} (0.386 sq mi or 247 acres) and river estuaries.

Saint-Yorre (French pronunciation: [sɛ̃tjɔʁ]; Occitan: Sant Tiorre) is a commune in the Allier department, Auvergne-Rhône-Alpes (Auvergne as former region), central France. The locality is renowned for its highly mineralized mineral water.

== Population ==
Historical population

Year	Pop.	±% p.a.
1793	233	—
1821	288	+0.76%
1846	278	−0.14%
1872	294	+0.22%
1881	364	+2.40%
1891	565	+4.49%
1896	734	+5.37%
1901	979	+5.93%
1906	1,195	+4.07%
1911	1,548	+5.31%
1921	1,657	+0.68%
1926	2,380	+7.51%
1931	2,711	+2.64%

Year	Pop.	±% p.a.
1936	2,463	−1.90%
1946	2,252	−0.89%
1954	2,778	+2.66%
1962	2,942	+0.72%
1968	3,042	+0.56%
1975	3,154	+0.52%
1982	3,103	−0.23%
1990	3,003	−0.41%
1999	2,840	−0.62%
2007	2,734	−0.47%
2012	2,788	+0.39%
2017	2,561	−1.68%
2023	2,641	+0.51%

Source: EHESS and INSEE

== Administration ==
=== List of mayors ===
- 1977-2008: Jésus Moran
- March 2008–November 2014: Roger Levillain
- November 2014–current: Joseph Kuchna

== See also ==
- Communes of the Allier department
