= MobiVie =

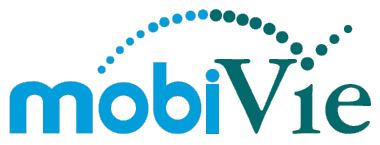

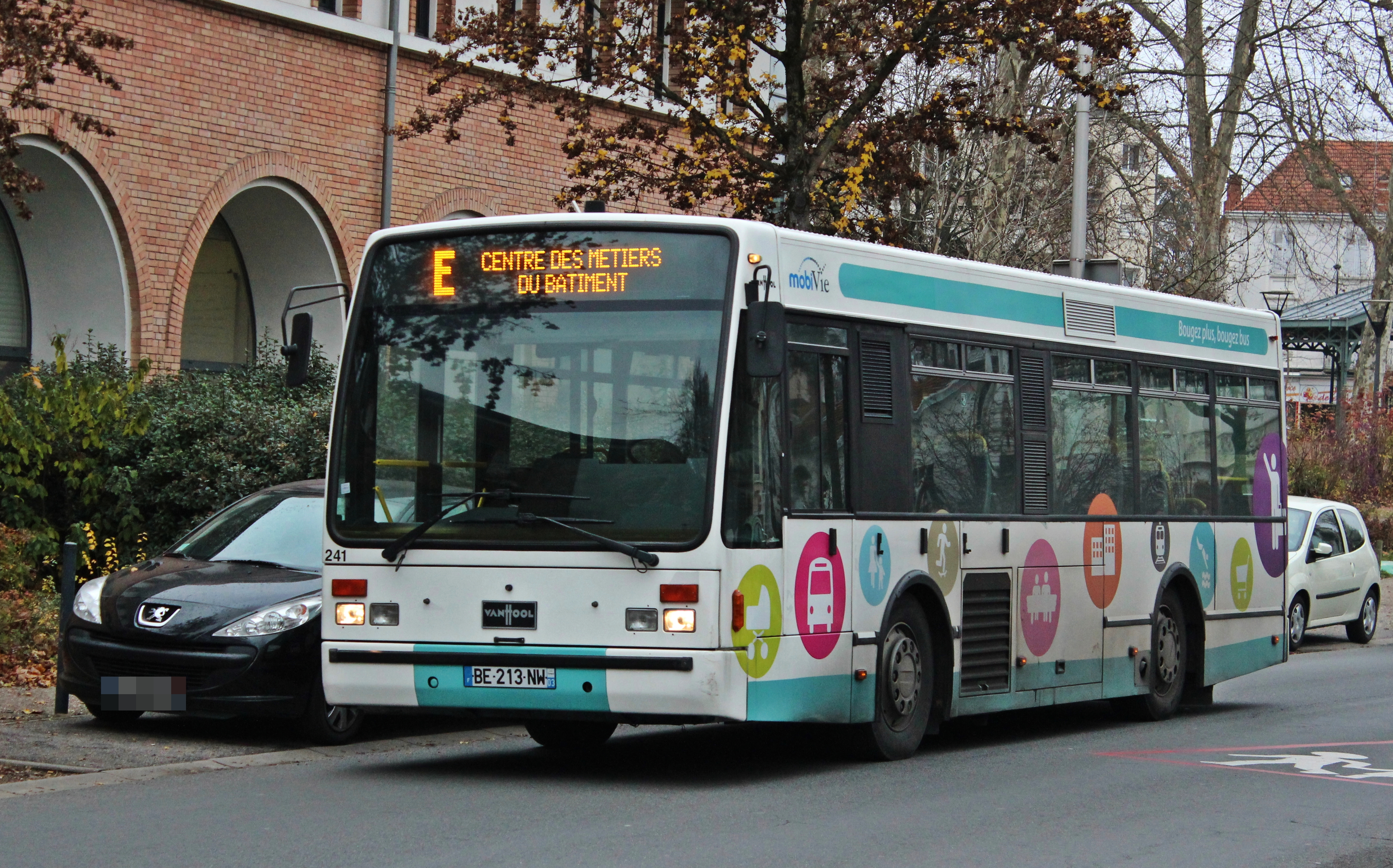
- VanHool A308 on the line E
- Founded: 1984 as Bus Inter
- Headquarters: Cusset
- Locale: Vichy
- Service area: Vichy Val d'Allier
- Service type: Bus service
- Routes: 8 lines
- Stops: 240 stops
- Fleet: 20 buses
- Daily ridership: 1,300,000
- Operator: Keolis
- Website: http://www.mobivie.fr

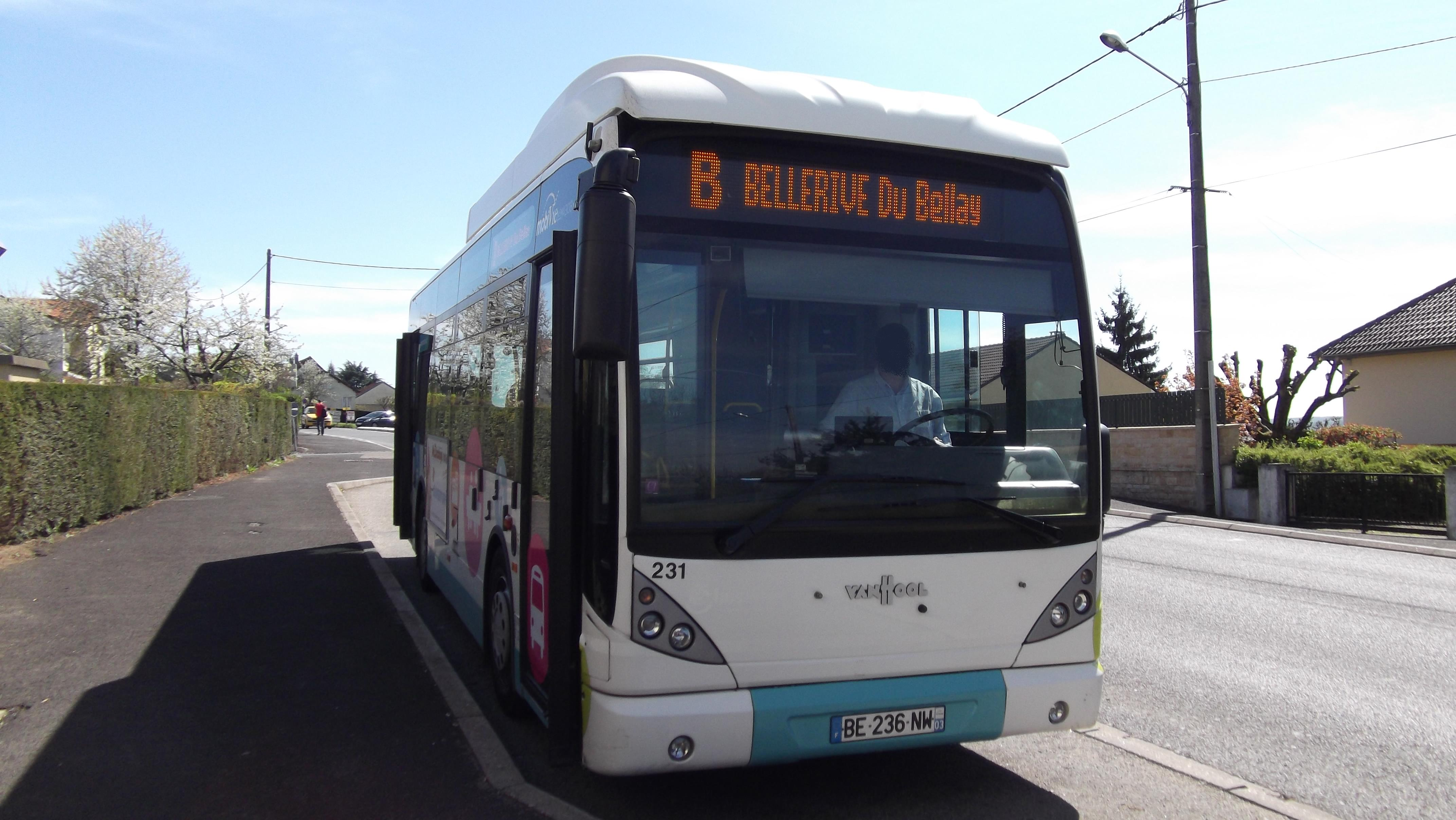
VanHool New A308 on the line B

MobiVie is the trade name of the transit network of the agglomeration community of Vichy Val of Allier in France. This network is operated by Keolis Vichy and is composed of 8 bus regular lines (indexed A-H) and complementary services such as demand responsive transport named MobiVie sur Mesure. The bus network covers 6 of 23 municipalities in Vichy Val d'Allier.

== Network ==
- 8 bus lines flowing from Monday to Saturday A B C D E F G H
- 2 bus lines operating on Sundays and public holidays A B
- School lines serving major schools Scol 1 to Scol 9 and Scol 4 bis.
- Demand responsive transport named MobiVie sur Mesure.

== See also ==
- Cusset
- Keolis
- Vichy
