= Puy-Guillaume =

- Commune
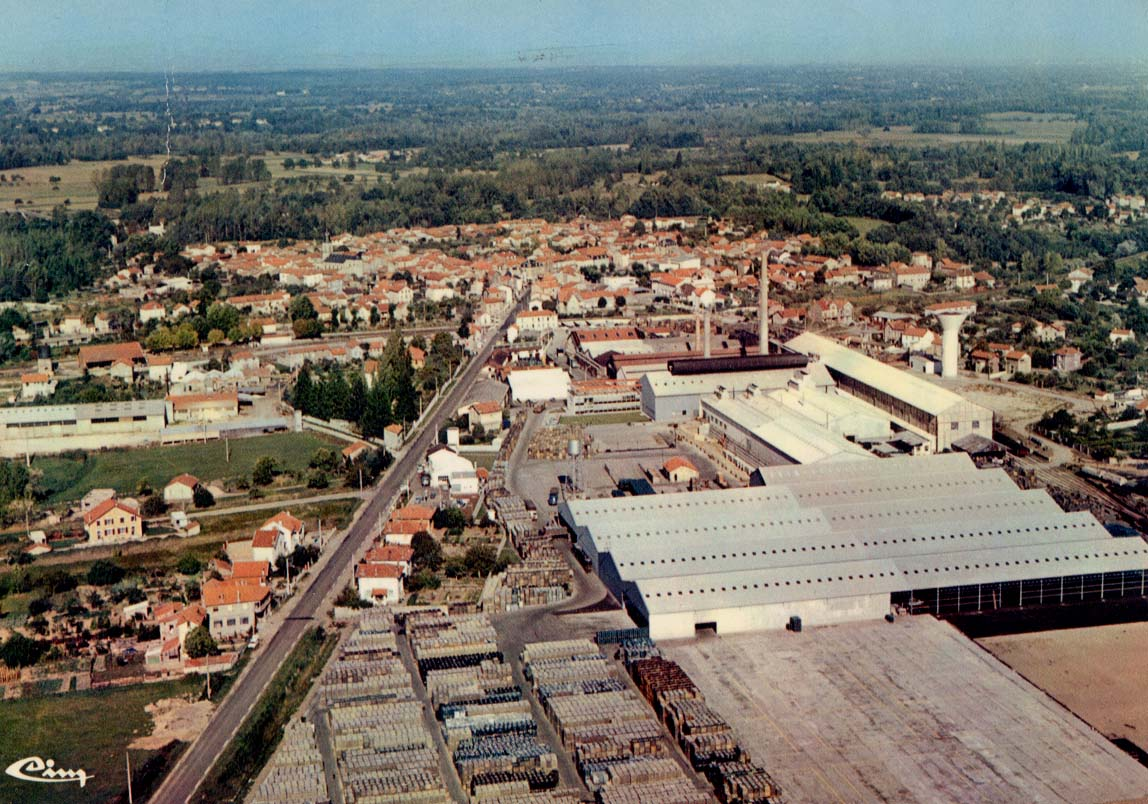
- Puy-guillaume

- Coat of arms
- Location of Puy-Guillaume
- Location within France Location within Auvergne-Rhône-Alpes
- Coordinates: 45°57′40″N 3°28′29″E
- Country: France
- Region: Auvergne-Rhône-Alpes
- Department: Puy-de-Dôme
- Arrondissement: Thiers
- Canton: Maringues
- Intercommunality: Thiers Dore et Montagne

Government
  - Mayor (2020–2026): Bernard Vignaud
- Area^{1}: 25.02 km^{2} (9.66 sq mi)
- Elevation: 286 m (938 ft)
- Highest elevation: 590 m (1,940 ft)
- Lowest elevation: 265 m (869 ft)
- Population (2023): 2,630
  - Density: 105/km^{2} (272/sq mi)
- Time zone: UTC+01:00 (CET)
  - Summer (DST): UTC+02:00 (CEST)
- INSEE/Postal code: 63291 /63290
- ^{1} French Land Register data, which excludes lakes, ponds, glaciers > 1 km^{2} (0.386 sq mi or 247 acres) and river estuaries.

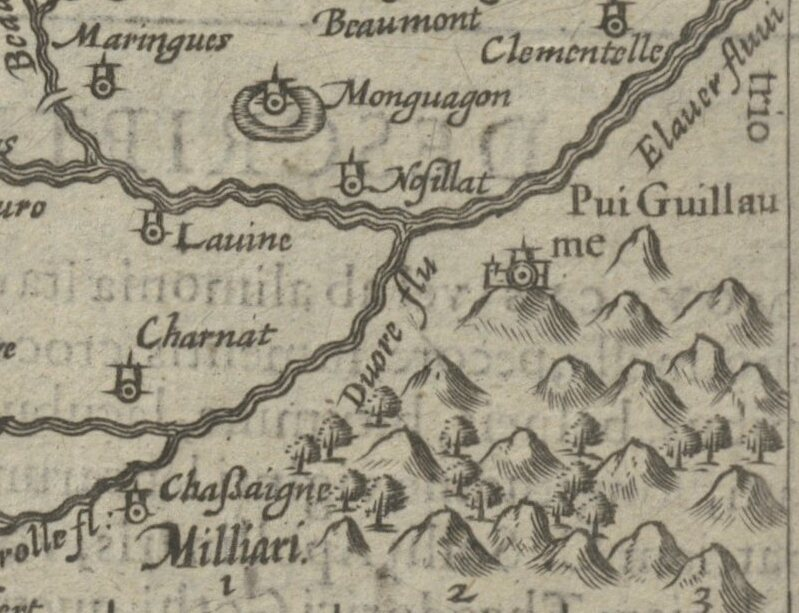
"Pui Guillaume" in a map by Petrus Bertius (1600)

Puy-Guillaume (French pronunciation: [pɥi ɡijom]; Occitan: Puèi Guilhame) is a commune in the Puy-de-Dôme department in Auvergne in central France.

== Population ==
Historical population
Year	Pop.	±% p.a.
1968	2,420	—
1975	2,595	+1.00%
1982	2,707	+0.61%
1990	2,634	−0.34%
1999	2,624	−0.04%
2007	2,698	+0.35%
2012	2,622	−0.57%
2017	2,752	+0.97%
2023	2,630	−0.75%
Source: INSEE

== See also ==
- Communes of the Puy-de-Dôme department
