= Randan, Puy-de-Dôme =

Randan
- Commune
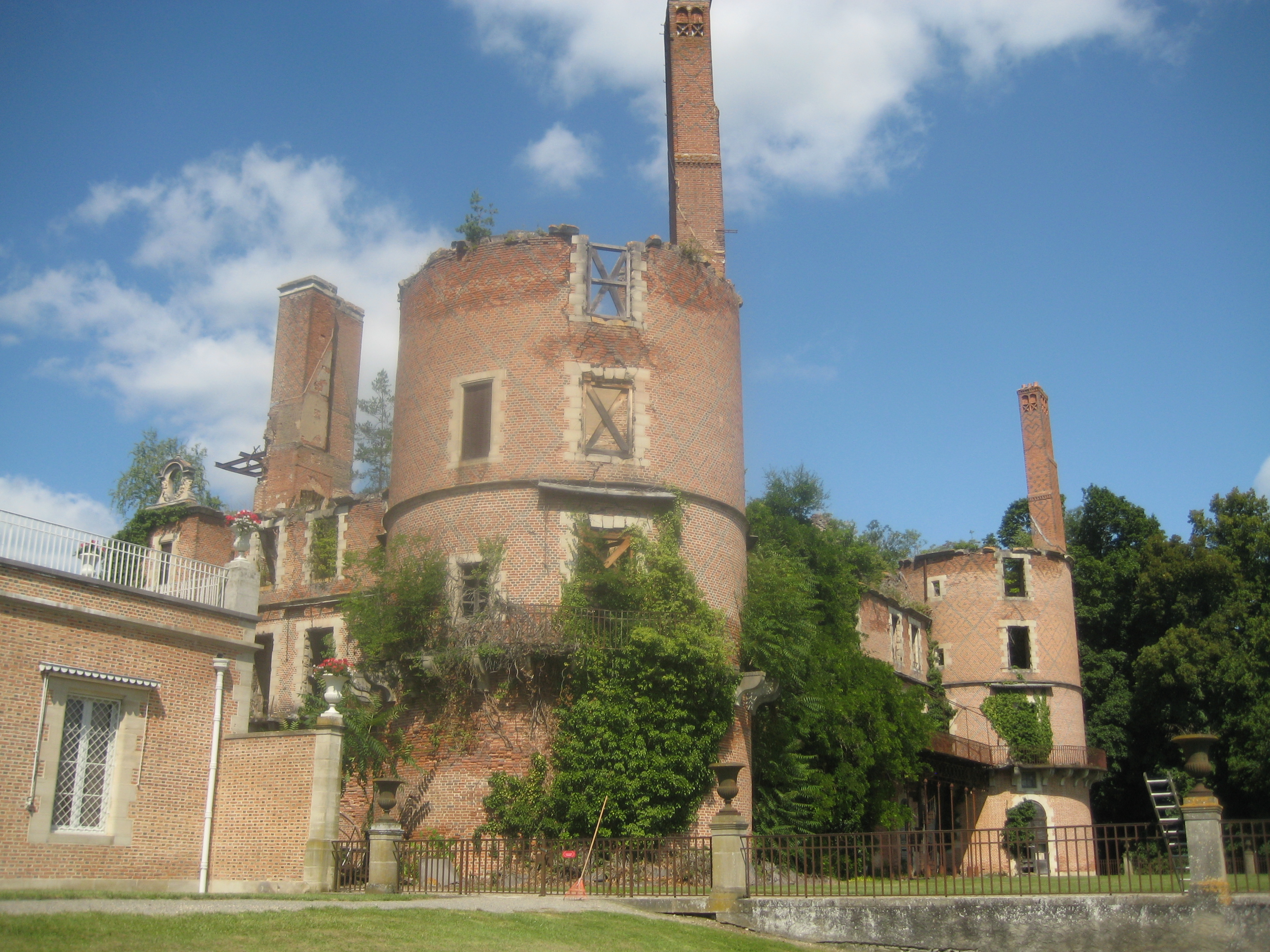
- The chateau in Randan

- Coat of arms
- Location of Randan
- Location within France Location within Auvergne-Rhône-Alpes
- Coordinates: 46°01′07″N 3°21′20″E
- Country: France
- Region: Auvergne-Rhône-Alpes
- Department: Puy-de-Dôme
- Arrondissement: Riom
- Canton: Maringues
- Intercommunality: Plaine Limagne

Government
  - Mayor (2026–32): Sandrine Chaneboux Ferrandon
- Area^{1}: 15.65 km^{2} (6.04 sq mi)
- Elevation: 410 m (1,350 ft)
- Highest elevation: 404 m (1,325 ft)
- Lowest elevation: 298 m (978 ft)
- Population (2023): 1,619
  - Density: 103.5/km^{2} (267.9/sq mi)
- Time zone: UTC+01:00 (CET)
  - Summer (DST): UTC+02:00 (CEST)
- INSEE/Postal code: 63295 /63310
- ^{1} French Land Register data, which excludes lakes, ponds, glaciers > 1 km^{2} (0.386 sq mi or 247 acres) and river estuaries.

Randan (French pronunciation: [ʁɑ̃dɑ̃]; Occitan: Randans) is a commune in the Puy-de-Dôme department in Auvergne-Rhône-Alpes in central France.

The place gives its name to Randanite, a soluble silica that occurs as fine earth near Randan and near Algiers. In the late 19th century the official composition of the dynamite at the Poudrerie nationale de Vonges and other French powder works was 75% nitroglycerin, 20.8% randanite, 3.8% Vierzon silica and 0.4% magnesium carbonate.

Randan was a holiday destination of the royal family of the House of Orléans in the early nineteenth century, thanks to the Château in Randan.

== See also ==
- Communes of the Puy-de-Dôme department
