= Ris, Puy-de-Dôme =

Ris
- Commune
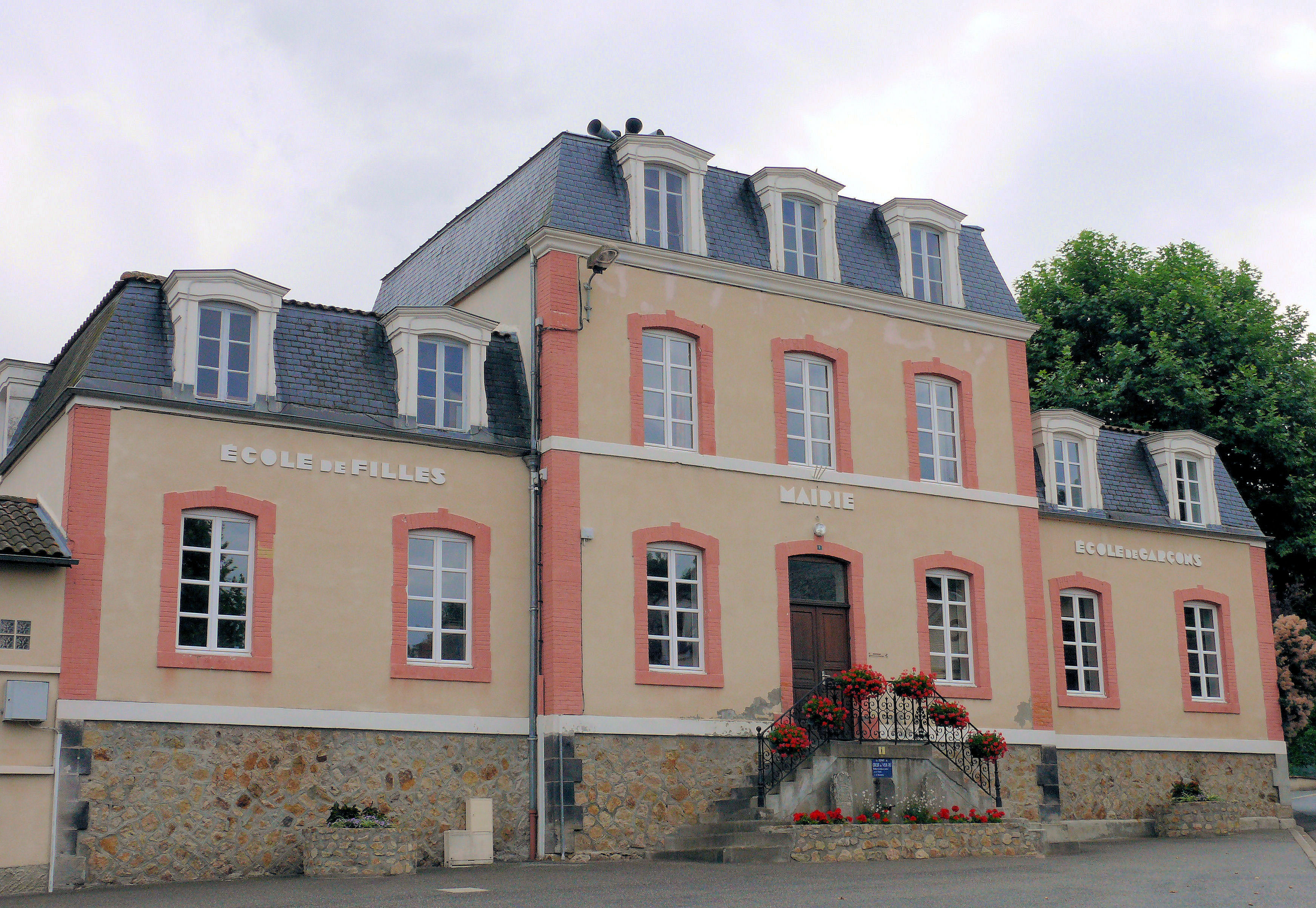
- The town hall and school in Ris

- Coat of arms
- Location of Ris
- Location within France Location within Auvergne-Rhône-Alpes
- Coordinates: 45°59′59″N 3°30′24″E
- Country: France
- Region: Auvergne-Rhône-Alpes
- Department: Puy-de-Dôme
- Arrondissement: Thiers
- Canton: Maringues

Government
  - Mayor (2020–2026): Georges Lopez
- Area^{1}: 15.76 km^{2} (6.08 sq mi)
- Elevation: 300 m (980 ft)
- Highest elevation: 593 m (1,946 ft)
- Lowest elevation: 259 m (850 ft)
- Population (2023): 718
  - Density: 45.6/km^{2} (118/sq mi)
- Time zone: UTC+01:00 (CET)
  - Summer (DST): UTC+02:00 (CEST)
- INSEE/Postal code: 63301 /63290
- ^{1} French Land Register data, which excludes lakes, ponds, glaciers > 1 km^{2} (0.386 sq mi or 247 acres) and river estuaries.

Ris is a commune in the Puy-de-Dôme department in Auvergne in central France.

== See also ==
- Communes of the Puy-de-Dôme department
