= Christophe de Chabrol de Crouzol =

French politician

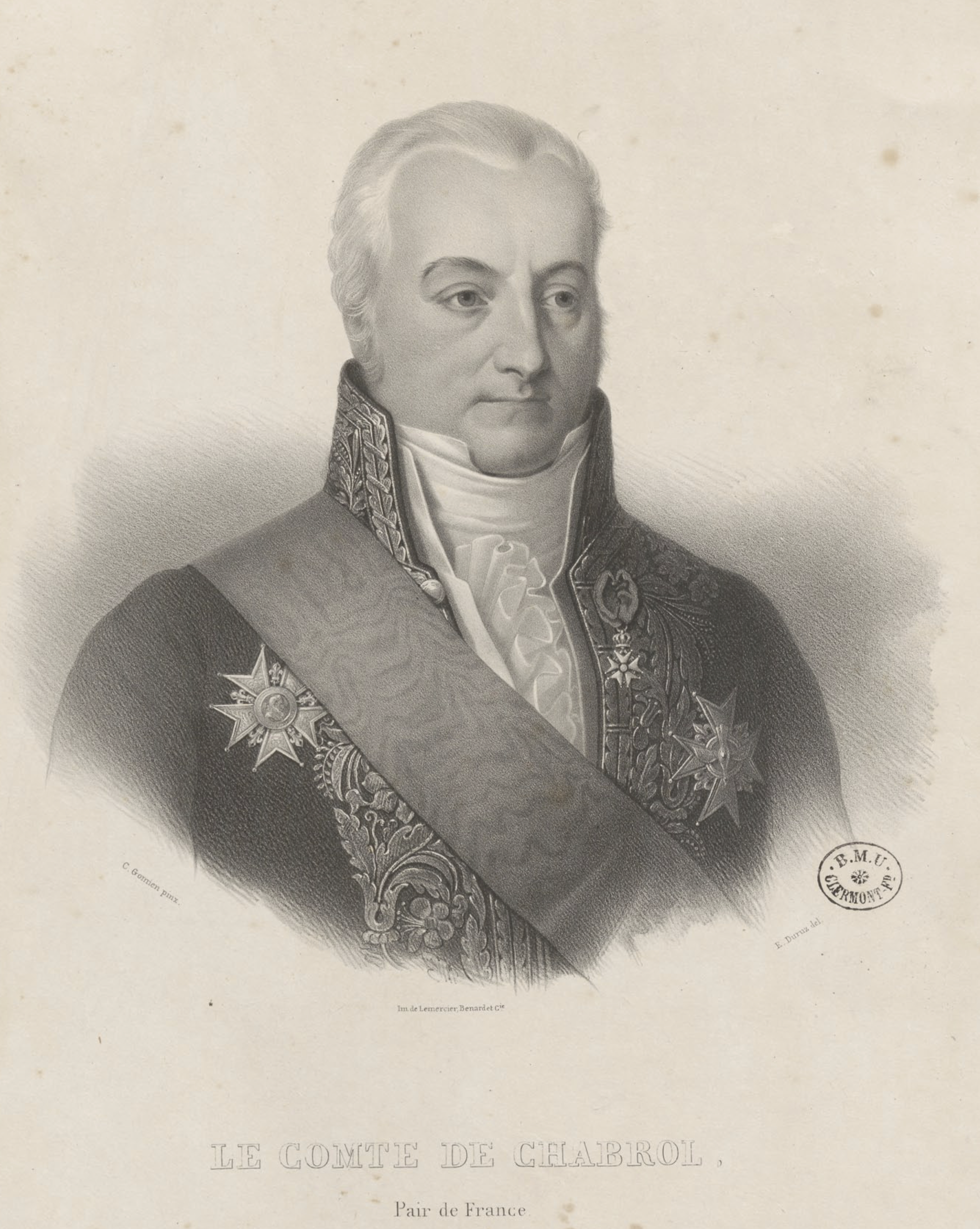
- Born: 16 November 1771; Riom, Puy-de-Dôme, France
- Died: 7 October 1836 (aged 64); Château de Chabannes, Paslières, Puy-de-Dôme, France
- Occupation: Politician
- Known for: Minister of the Navy

Christophe André Jean de Chabrol de Crouzol (16 November 1771 – 7 October 1836) was a French politician who served in the administration of Napoleon, then adhered to the Bourbon Restoration in 1814. As Prefect of Rhône he acquiesced in brutal reprisals in 1817 against former supporters of Bonaparte. He was an elected deputy from 1820 to 1822, then was made a peer of France. He served as Minister of the Navy (1824–29) and as Minister of Finance (1829–30). Chabrol resigned before the July Revolution of 1830, unwilling to remain associated with the increasingly repressive government, but remained a supporter of the Bourbon monarchy.

== Family ==
Chabrol came from a notable bourgeois family from Auvergne. His great-grandfather Jacques Chabrol (1649–1732) was a Protestant who converted to Catholicism in 1682 and was king's advocate in Riom. His grandfather Guillaume Michel de Chabrol (1714–1792) was king's counsel in Riom, a jurist and author of works on the customs and history of Auvergne. He made a large fortune and became an extensive landowner. He was knighted by Louis XV in 1767 and made a Counselor of State in 1782. His father Gaspard-Claude-François de Chabrol (1740–1816) served as an officer in the Dragoons, then joined the judiciary. His mother was Madelaine-Daisy Vissaguet. They married in 1766.

== Early career ==
Christophe André Jean de Chabrol de Crouzol was born in Riom, Puy-de-Dôme, on 16 November 1771, the second son of five sons and one daughter. He was destined to become a priest, and was raised in the congregation of the Oratorians. His father became involved in politics, and in 1789 was elected a deputy representing the nobility of Auvergne Third Estate in the Estates General, voting with the right and against the constitution of 1791. During the French Revolution Christophe de Chabrol refused to take the oath on the civil constitution of the clergy, and left the priesthood. His father also became a suspect during the Terror, and the family was imprisoned. They were not released until 1795. The titular king Louis XVIII made Gaspard de Chabrol a hereditary count.

On 25 Thermidor Year XI (August 1803) Christophe de Chabrol became an auditor of the Council of State. On 11 August 1808 he was made a Knight of the Empire. In 1809 he was appointed Master of Requests (maître des requêtes). He was sent to Tuscany as a member of the commission for liquidating the debts of that country. He was promoted Count of the Empire on 9 March 1810. In March 1811 he was appointed President of the Chamber at the imperial court in Paris. On 16 August 1811 he was appointed Quartermaster General of the Illyrian Provinces. In August 1813 Chabrol returned to Paris when the Austrian army advanced on Ljubljana.

== Bourbon Restoration ==
In 1814 Chabrol supported the first Bourbon Restoration. He was appointed to the Finance section of the Council of State on 5 July 1814, and then to the prefecture of the Rhône on 22 November 1814. When he heard of the return of Napoleon from Elba, Chabrol tried to place Lyon in a state of defense. Seeing that resistance was futile, he left the city when Napoleon entered and joined the Count of Artois. He returned to Lyon after the Battle of Waterloo on 17 July 1815 and resumed his duties as prefect after the Austrians commanded by Ferdinand, Count of Bubna, had occupied the city.

In 1817 Chabrol was caught up in the reactionary zeal of General Simon Canuel. He failed to stop the excesses that followed. He accepted the alleged conspiracy of 22 October 1816 which gave the pretext for installing the guillotine permanently and recalled the worst days of the Terror. On 5 September 1817 King Louis XVIII told General Marmont to restore peace. Canuel was dismissed and Chabrol recalled. Chabrol was appointed Undersecretary of State in the Ministry of the Interior on 24 September 1817.

Chabrol left the ministry when Élie, duc Decazes, replaced Joseph Lainé as minister. On 16 July 1820 he resumed his duties at the Council of State. On 13 November 1820 he was elected deputy for the department of Puy-de-Dôme. He sat with the government majority. On 23 January 1821 he was appointed head of the Directorate General of Registration and Estates. He was reelected on 10 October 1821. On 23 December 1823 he was made a peer of France.

== Minister ==
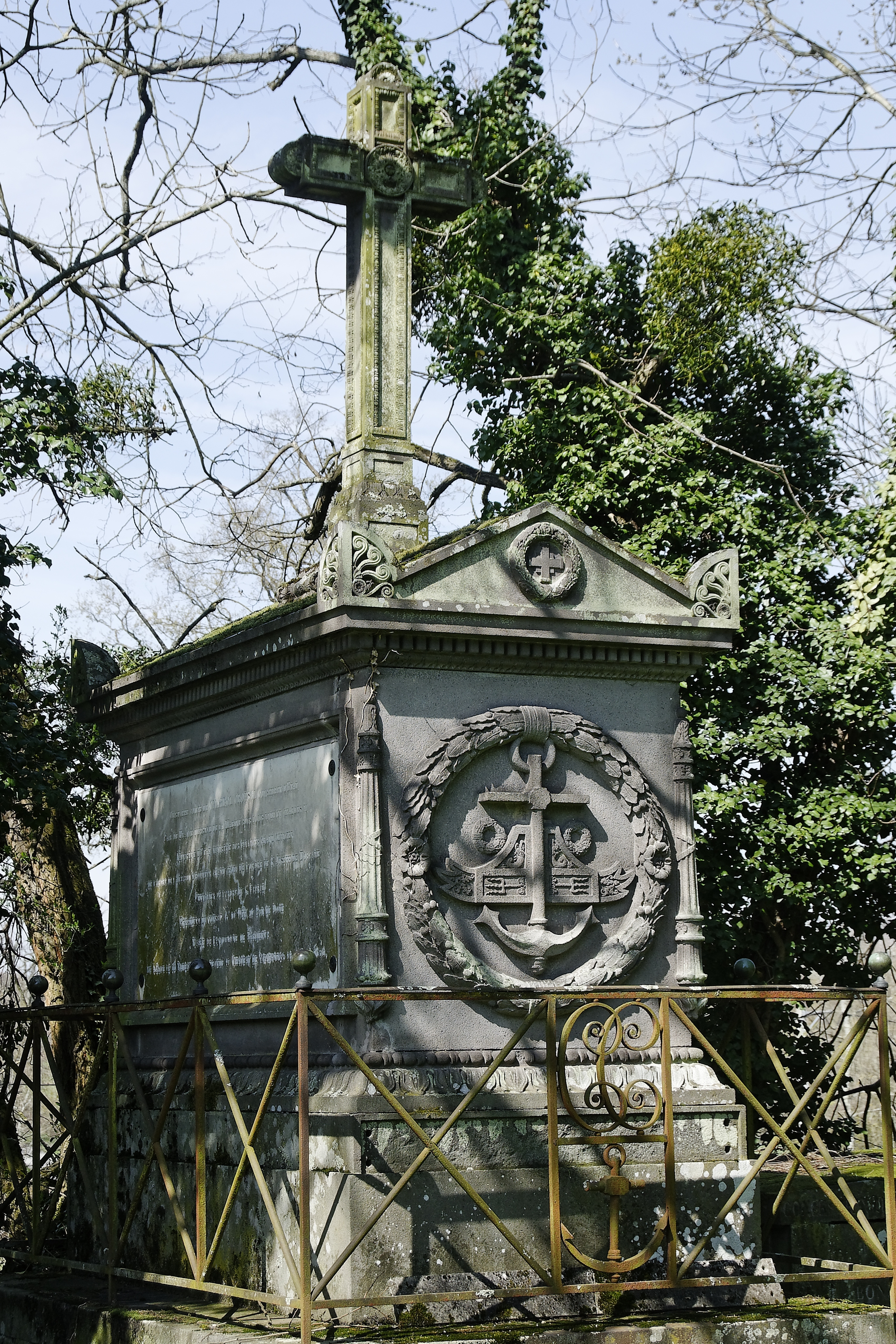
Tomb of Christophe de Chabrol de Crouzol at Paslières

Chabrol was appointed Minister of the Navy in the Ministry of Joseph de Villèle on 4 August 1824. Although attacked for incompetence by the opposition journals, his term of office was marked by several achievements including formation of the Admiralty Board, restoration of maritime prefectures, creation of a naval academy, resumption of shipbuilding and the application of French law to the colonies. Chabrol was more moderate than his colleagues and did not approve of the dismissal of the National Guard. When the Villèle ministry fell, Chabrol was the only minister to retain his position in the Ministry of Jean-Baptiste de Martignac. However, when the Chamber of Deputies passed a motion that described the actions of the former Villèle ministry as "deplorable", Chabrol resigned, leaving office on 2 March 1828.

Chabrol returned to office on 7 August 1829 as Minister of Finance in the Ministry of Jules de Polignac at the urgent request of King Charles X, although he did not conceal his misgivings about the composition of the cabinet. He was able to raise a loan of 80 million francs, establish new financial regulations that saved 6 million francs, and provide a reserve of 60 million francs for public works. He resigned on 18 May 1830, concerned that the next elections would bring in a majority hostile to the repressive measures of the king and Jules de Polignac. Chabrol took his seat in the Chamber of Peers. In the debates he fought the motions to exile Charles X and his family, and opposed the Bonaparte family.

Christophe de Chabrol de Crouzol died at the Château de Chabannes, Paslières, Puy-de-Dôme, on 7 October 1836, aged 64.

== Bibliography ==
Chabrol was the author of various reports as a deputy, peer or minister. He also published a vindication of the events in Lyon in 1817:

- Sur les Événements de Lyon, au mois de juin 1817, par M. le comte de Chabrol, ancien préfet du Rhône. Paris: A. Égron. 1818. p. 76.

== Sources ==
- Antonetti, Guy (25 January 2013). "Chabrol De Crouzol (Christophe-André-Jean de)". Les ministres des Finances de la Révolution française au Second Empire (in French). Institut de la gestion publique et du développement économique. ISBN 978-2-11-094807-6.
- "Christophe André Jean Chabrol de Crousol (1771-1836) - Auteur du texte". BNF.
- Robert, Adolphe; Cougny, Gaston (1891). "Chabrol de Crousol (Christophe, Comte de)". Dictionnaire des parlementaires français de 1789 à 1889 (PDF). Vol. II: CAY à FES.
