= Vinzelles =

Vinzelles may refer to:

- Vinzelles, Puy-de-Dôme, a commune in the French region of Auvergne
- Vinzelles, Saône-et-Loire, a commune in the French region of Bourgogne
