= Arrondissement of Thiers =

Coordinates: 45°51′27″N 3°32′32″E

Thiers
- Arrondissement
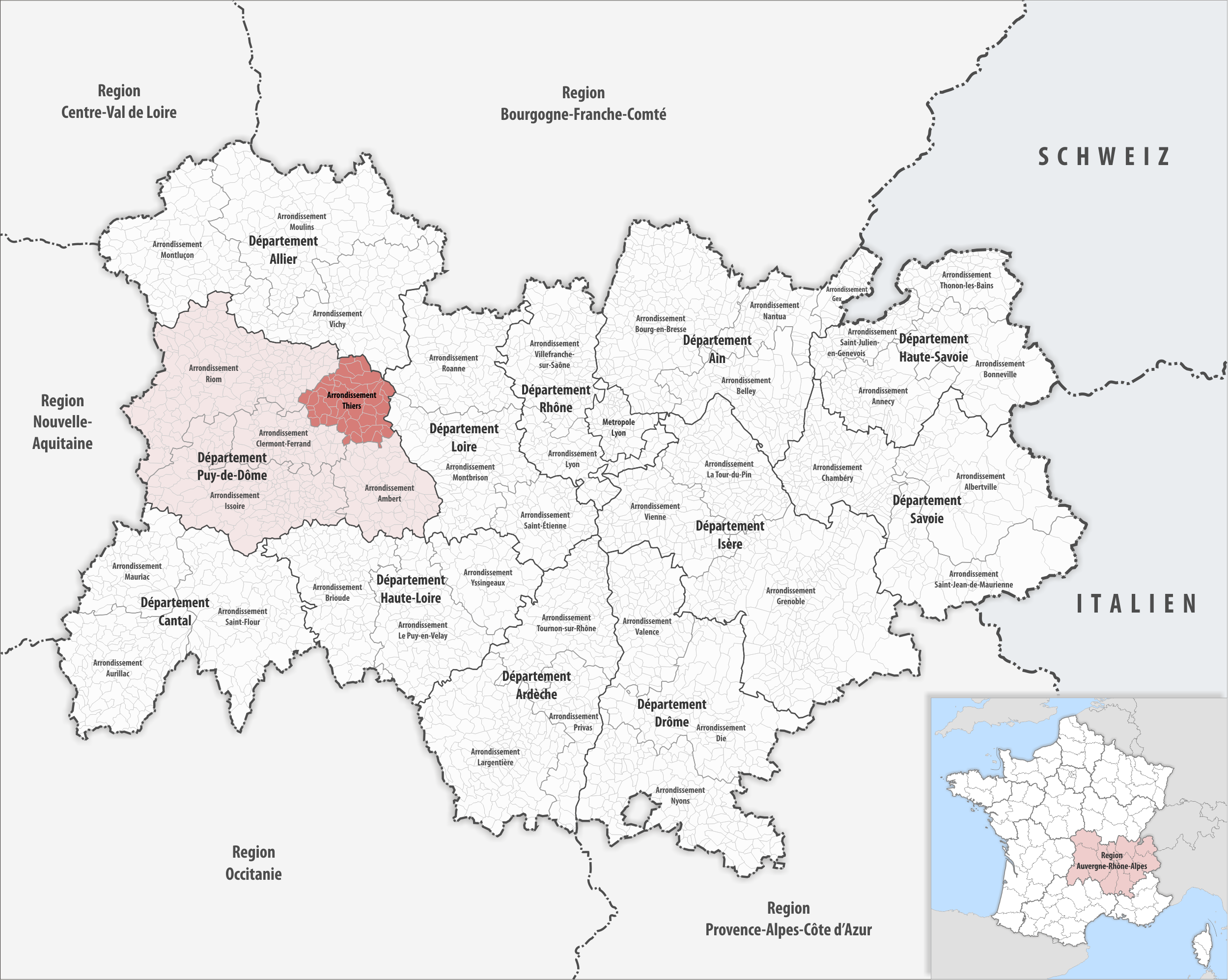
- Location within the region Auvergne-Rhône-Alpes
- Country: France
- Region: Auvergne-Rhône-Alpes
- Department: Puy-de-Dôme
- No. of communes: {{{nbcomm}}}
- Area: 853.5 km^{2} (329.5 sq mi)
- Population (2023): 56,557
  - Density: 66.26/km^{2} (171.6/sq mi)
- INSEE code: 635

The arrondissement of Thiers is an arrondissement of France in the Puy-de-Dôme department in the Auvergne-Rhône-Alpes region. It has 44 communes. Its population is 56,245 (2021), and its area is 853.5 km^{2} (329.5 sq mi).

== Composition ==
The communes of the arrondissement of Thiers, and their INSEE codes, are:

1. Arconsat (63008)
2. Aubusson-d'Auvergne (63015)
3. Augerolles (63016)
4. Bort-l'Étang (63045)
5. Bulhon (63058)
6. Celles-sur-Durolle (63066)
7. Chabreloche (63072)
8. Charnat (63095)
9. Châteldon (63102)
10. Courpière (63125)
11. Crevant-Laveine (63128)
12. Culhat (63131)
13. Dorat (63138)
14. Escoutoux (63151)
15. Joze (63180)
16. Lachaux (63184)
17. Lempty (63194)
18. Lezoux (63195)
19. Moissat (63229)
20. La Monnerie-le-Montel (63231)
21. Noalhat (63253)
22. Néronde-sur-Dore (63249)
23. Olmet (63260)
24. Orléat (63265)
25. Palladuc (63267)
26. Paslières (63271)
27. Peschadoires (63276)
28. Puy-Guillaume (63291)
29. Ravel (63296)
30. La Renaudie (63298)
31. Ris (63301)
32. Sainte-Agathe (63310)
33. Saint-Flour-l'Étang (63343)
34. Saint-Jean-d'Heurs (63364)
35. Saint-Rémy-sur-Durolle (63393)
36. Saint-Victor-Montvianeix (63402)
37. Sauviat (63414)
38. Sermentizon (63418)
39. Seychalles (63420)
40. Thiers (63430)
41. Vinzelles (63461)
42. Viscomtat (63463)
43. Vollore-Montagne (63468)
44. Vollore-Ville (63469)

== History ==
The arrondissement of Thiers was created in 1800. At the January 2017 reorganisation of the arrondissements of Puy-de-Dôme, it gained four communes from the arrondissement of Clermont-Ferrand, and it lost three communes to the arrondissement of Riom.

As a result of the reorganisation of the cantons of France which came into effect in 2015, the borders of the cantons are no longer related to the borders of the arrondissements. The cantons of the arrondissement of Thiers were, as of January 2015:

1. Châteldon
2. Courpière
3. Lezoux
4. Maringues
5. Saint-Rémy-sur-Durolle
6. Thiers
