= Orléat =

- Commune
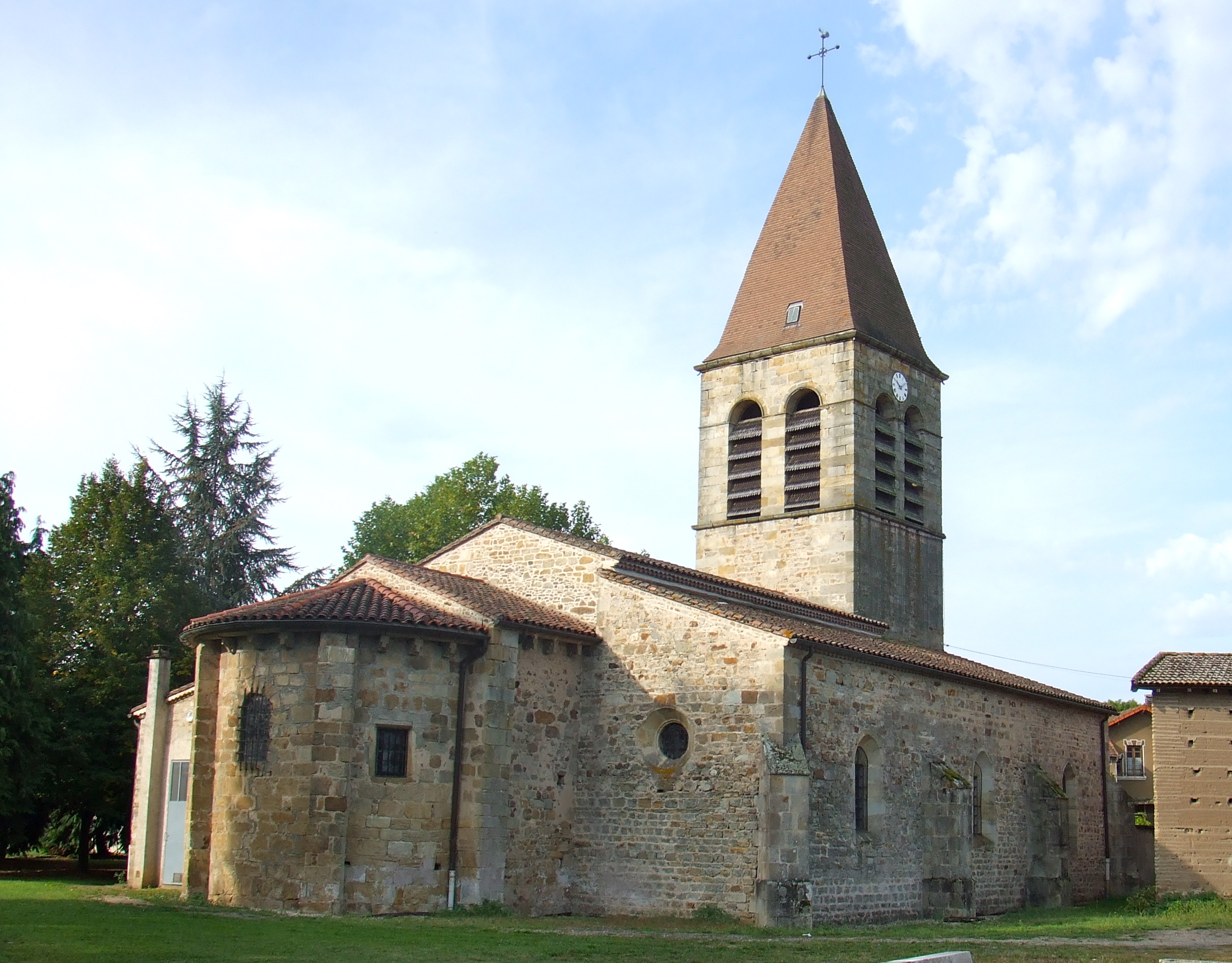
- The church in Orléat

- Coat of arms
- Location of Orléat
- Location within France Location within Auvergne-Rhône-Alpes
- Coordinates: 45°51′40″N 3°25′16″E
- Country: France
- Region: Auvergne-Rhône-Alpes
- Department: Puy-de-Dôme
- Arrondissement: Thiers
- Canton: Lezoux
- Intercommunality: Entre Dore et Allier

Government
  - Mayor (2020–2026): Elisabeth Brussat
- Area^{1}: 26.43 km^{2} (10.20 sq mi)
- Elevation: 340 m (1,120 ft)
- Highest elevation: 398 m (1,306 ft)
- Lowest elevation: 283 m (928 ft)
- Population (2023): 2,242
  - Density: 84.83/km^{2} (219.7/sq mi)
- Time zone: UTC+01:00 (CET)
  - Summer (DST): UTC+02:00 (CEST)
- INSEE/Postal code: 63265 /63190
- ^{1} French Land Register data, which excludes lakes, ponds, glaciers > 1 km^{2} (0.386 sq mi or 247 acres) and river estuaries.

Orléat (French pronunciation: [ɔʁlea]; Orlhat in Occitan) is a commune in the Puy-de-Dôme département in Auvergne in central France.

== Population ==
Historical population
Year	Pop.	±% p.a.
1968	757	—
1975	1,050	+4.78%
1982	1,397	+4.16%
1990	1,569	+1.46%
1999	1,623	+0.38%
2007	1,872	+1.80%
2012	2,062	+1.95%
2017	2,157	+0.90%
2023	2,242	+0.65%
Source: INSEE

== See also ==
- Communes of the Puy-de-Dôme department
