= Bulhon =

- Commune
- Coat of arms
- Location of Bulhon
- Location within France Location within Auvergne-Rhône-Alpes
- Coordinates: 45°53′43″N 3°23′10″E
- Country: France
- Region: Auvergne-Rhône-Alpes
- Department: Puy-de-Dôme
- Arrondissement: Thiers
- Canton: Lezoux
- Intercommunality: Entre Dore et Allier

Government
  - Mayor (2026–32): Jean-Baptiste Girard
- Area^{1}: 12.47 km^{2} (4.81 sq mi)
- Elevation: 350 m (1,150 ft)
- Highest elevation: 383 m (1,257 ft)
- Lowest elevation: 317 m (1,040 ft)
- Population (2023): 607
  - Density: 48.7/km^{2} (126/sq mi)
- Time zone: UTC+01:00 (CET)
  - Summer (DST): UTC+02:00 (CEST)
- INSEE/Postal code: 63058 /63350
- ^{1} French Land Register data, which excludes lakes, ponds, glaciers > 1 km^{2} (0.386 sq mi or 247 acres) and river estuaries.

Bulhon is a commune in the Puy-de-Dôme department in Auvergne-Rhône-Alpes in central France.

== Population ==
Historical population
Year	Pop.	±% p.a.
1968	212	—
1975	279	+4.00%
1982	302	+1.14%
1990	363	+2.33%
1999	357	−0.19%
2007	442	+2.71%
2012	527	+3.58%
2017	530	+0.11%
2023	607	+2.29%
Source: INSEE

== See also ==
- Communes of the Puy-de-Dôme department
