= Lezoux =

- Commune
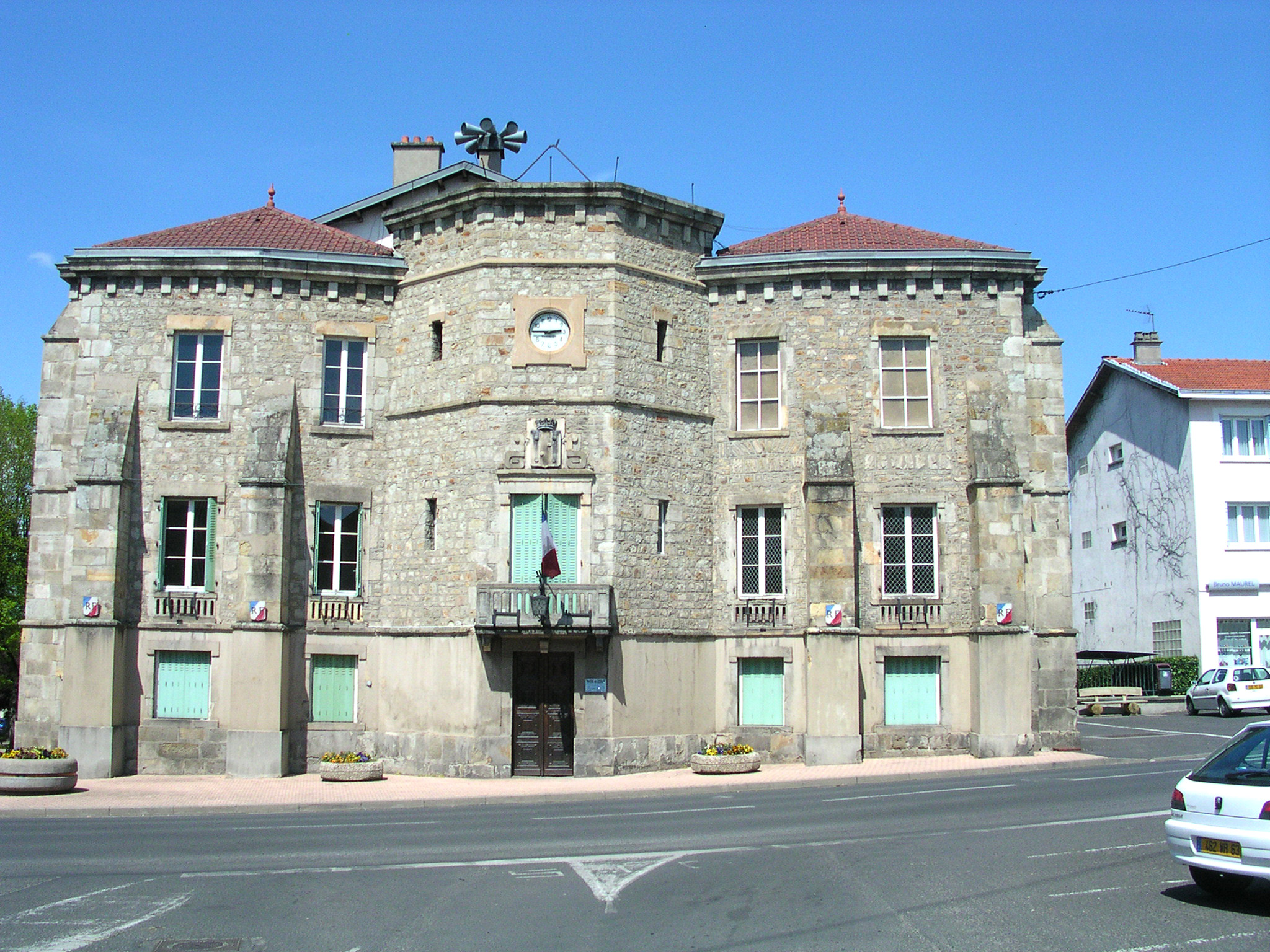
- The town hall in Lezoux

- Coat of arms
- Location of Lezoux
- Location within France Location within Auvergne-Rhône-Alpes
- Coordinates: 45°49′42″N 3°22′51″E
- Country: France
- Region: Auvergne-Rhône-Alpes
- Department: Puy-de-Dôme
- Arrondissement: Thiers
- Canton: Lezoux
- Intercommunality: Entre Dore et Allier

Government
  - Mayor (2020–2026): Alain Cosson
- Area^{1}: 34.69 km^{2} (13.39 sq mi)
- Elevation: 351 m (1,152 ft)
- Highest elevation: 421 m (1,381 ft)
- Lowest elevation: 317 m (1,040 ft)
- Population (2023): 6,528
  - Density: 188.2/km^{2} (487.4/sq mi)
- Time zone: UTC+01:00 (CET)
  - Summer (DST): UTC+02:00 (CEST)
- INSEE/Postal code: 63195 /63190
- ^{1} French Land Register data, which excludes lakes, ponds, glaciers > 1 km^{2} (0.386 sq mi or 247 acres) and river estuaries.

Lezoux (French pronunciation: [ləzu]; Occitan: Lesós) is a commune in the Puy-de-Dôme department in Auvergne in central France. It was a key location in the filming of the 2004 film Les Choristes (The Chorus).

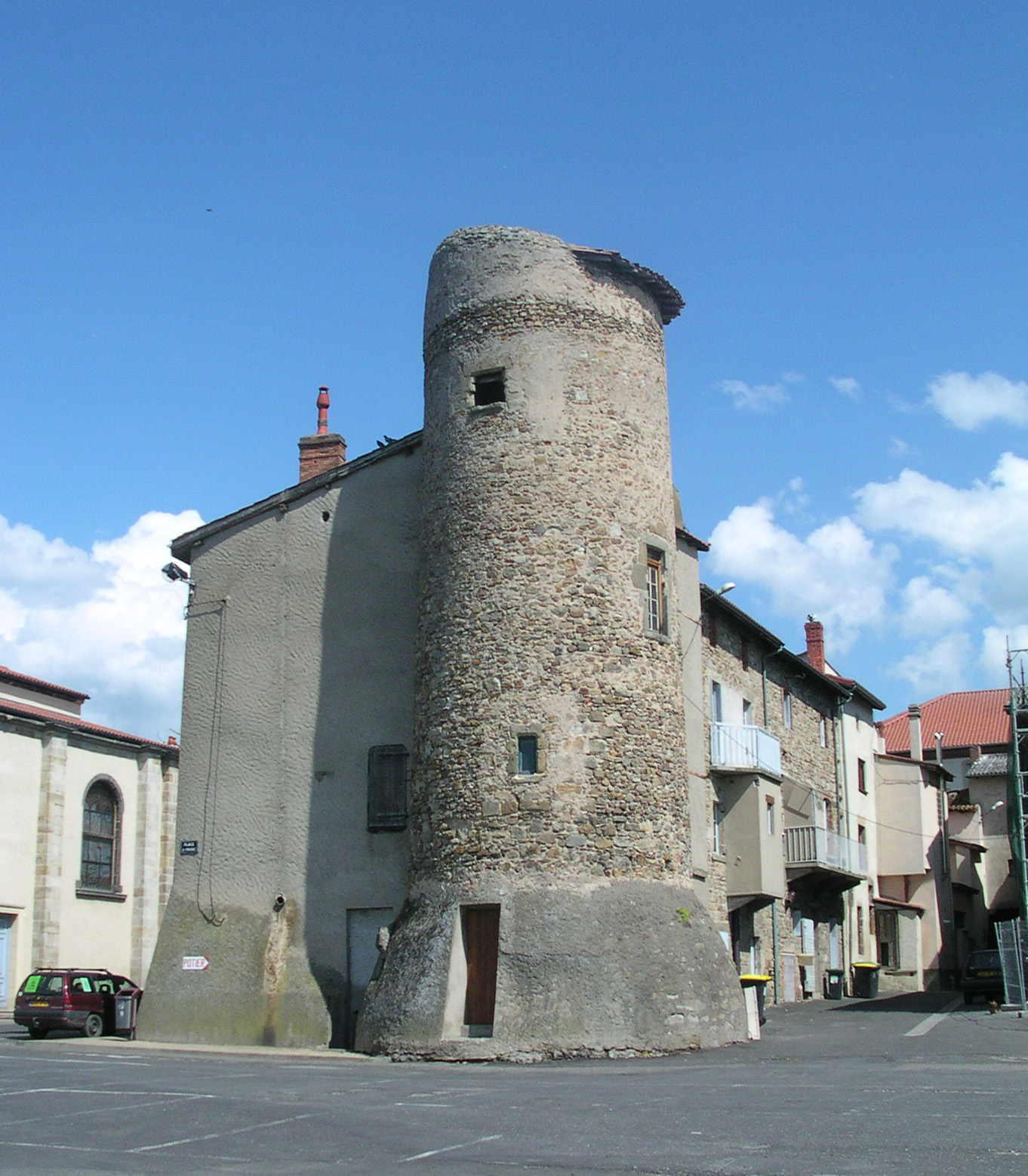
A tower remain of the city defense wall

== Population ==
Historical population
Year	Pop.	±% p.a.
1968	4,038	—
1975	4,632	+1.98%
1982	4,747	+0.35%
1990	4,819	+0.19%
1999	4,957	+0.31%
2007	5,508	+1.33%
2012	5,670	+0.58%
2017	6,152	+1.65%
2023	6,528	+0.99%
Source: INSEE

== See also ==
- Communes of the Puy-de-Dôme department
- Lezoux Plate
