= Crevant-Laveine =

- Commune
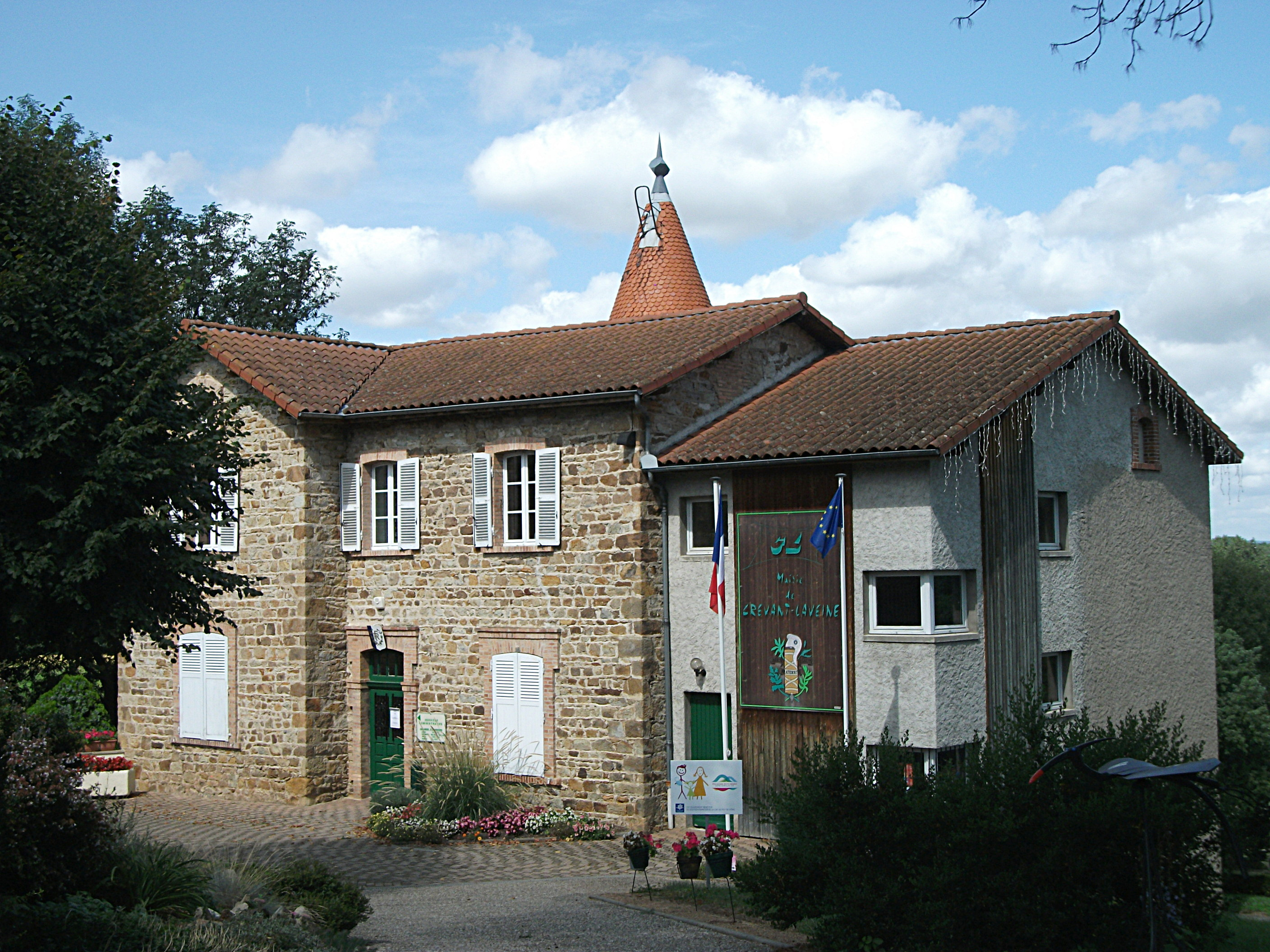
- The town hall in Crevant-Laveine
- Location of Crevant-Laveine
- Location within France Location within Auvergne-Rhône-Alpes
- Coordinates: 45°54′56″N 3°22′34″E
- Country: France
- Region: Auvergne-Rhône-Alpes
- Department: Puy-de-Dôme
- Arrondissement: Thiers
- Canton: Lezoux
- Intercommunality: Entre Dore et Allier

Government
  - Mayor (2020–2026): Agnès Tartry-Lavest
- Area^{1}: 19.76 km^{2} (7.63 sq mi)
- Elevation: 301 m (988 ft)
- Highest elevation: 364 m (1,194 ft)
- Lowest elevation: 276 m (906 ft)
- Population (2023): 967
  - Density: 48.9/km^{2} (127/sq mi)
- Time zone: UTC+01:00 (CET)
  - Summer (DST): UTC+02:00 (CEST)
- INSEE/Postal code: 63128 /63350
- ^{1} French Land Register data, which excludes lakes, ponds, glaciers > 1 km^{2} (0.386 sq mi or 247 acres) and river estuaries.

Crevant-Laveine (French pronunciation: [kʁəvɑ̃ lavɛn]) is a commune in the Puy-de-Dôme department in Auvergne-Rhône-Alpes in central France.

== Places and monuments ==
Mountain castle, park by landscape architects, François-Marie Treyve and Joseph Marie. Château de la Terrasse, built from 1787 to 1790, by the architect Claude-François-Marie Attiret for Antoine Sablon du Corail (1762–1793) a close friend of the Count of Artois, who was inspired by Bagatelle to erect this castle. It is presented on a plan massed with two floors on basement, covered with a flat roof. The elements planned to crown the walls (balustrades, sculptures) were not carried out, as construction was halted due to the French Revolution. A dome was added in the 19th century.

== Notable residents ==
Patrick Depailler: Formula 1 driver (° Clermont-Ferrand August 9, 1944, † Hockenheim (Germany) August 1, 1980) is buried in the town cemetery.

== See also ==
- Communes of the Puy-de-Dôme department
