= Joze =

- Commune
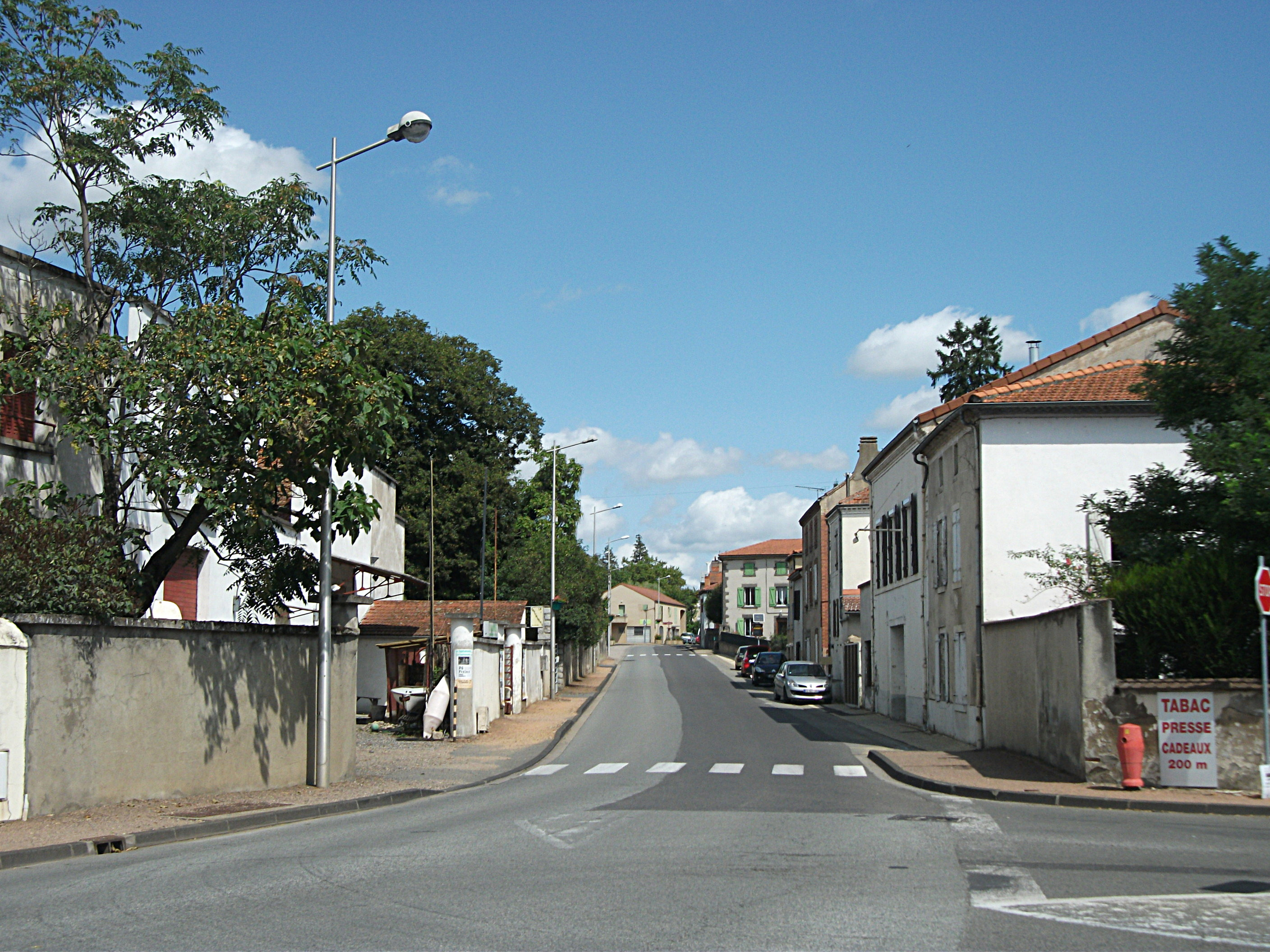
- The D1093 road in Joze

- Coat of arms
- Location of Joze
- Location within France Location within Auvergne-Rhône-Alpes
- Coordinates: 45°51′50″N 3°18′10″E
- Country: France
- Region: Auvergne-Rhône-Alpes
- Department: Puy-de-Dôme
- Arrondissement: Thiers
- Canton: Lezoux

Government
  - Mayor (2026–32): Daniel Peynon
- Area^{1}: 19.35 km^{2} (7.47 sq mi)
- Elevation: 314 m (1,030 ft)
- Highest elevation: 342 m (1,122 ft)
- Lowest elevation: 288 m (945 ft)
- Population (2023): 1,183
  - Density: 61.14/km^{2} (158.3/sq mi)
- Time zone: UTC+01:00 (CET)
  - Summer (DST): UTC+02:00 (CEST)
- INSEE/Postal code: 63180 /63350
- ^{1} French Land Register data, which excludes lakes, ponds, glaciers > 1 km^{2} (0.386 sq mi or 247 acres) and river estuaries.

Joze (French pronunciation: [ʒoz]) is a commune in the Puy-de-Dôme department in Auvergne in central France.

== See also ==
- Communes of the Puy-de-Dôme department
