= Saint-Jean-d'Heurs =

- Commune
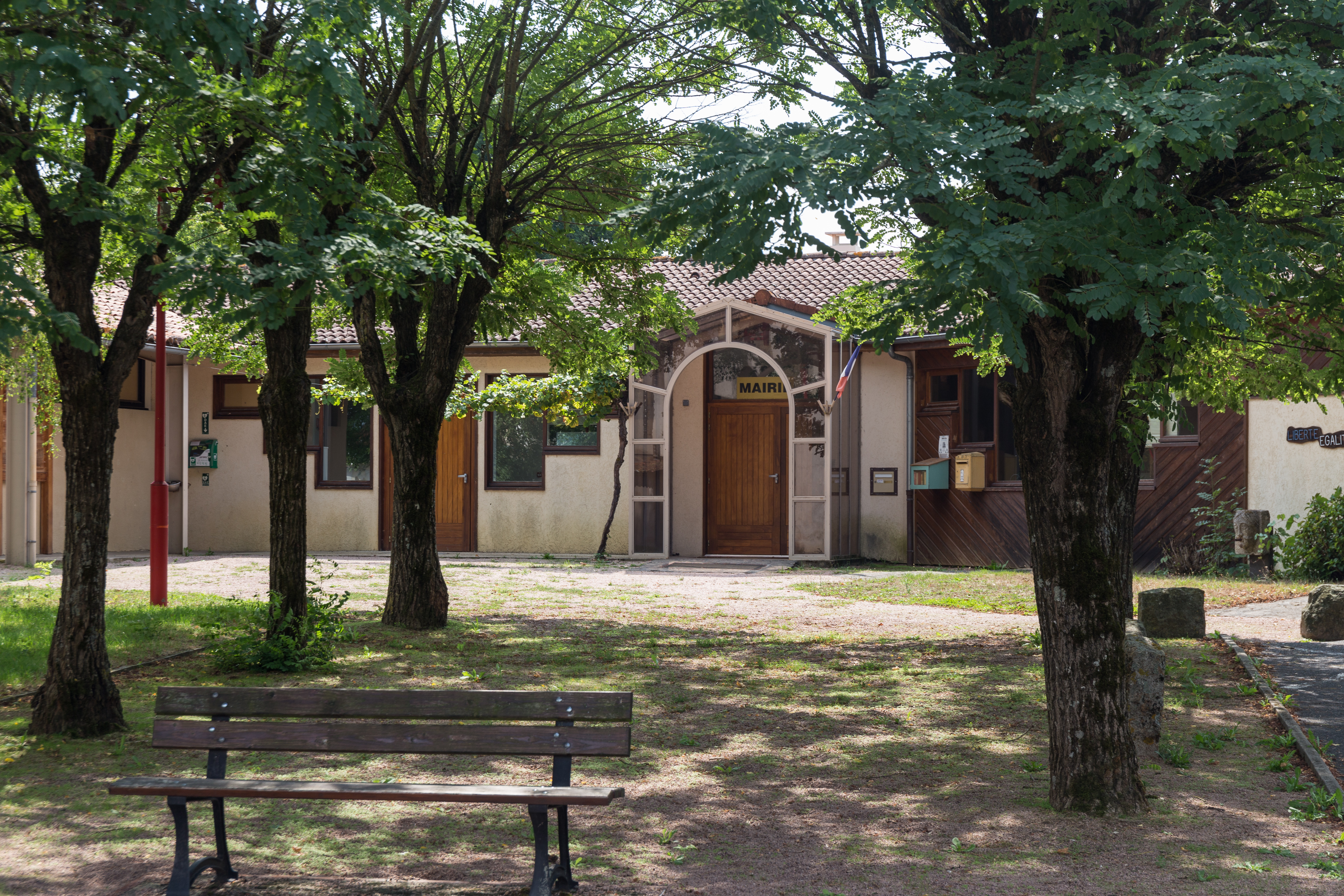
- Saint-Jean-d'Heurs Town hall

- Coat of arms
- Location of Saint-Jean-d'Heurs
- Location within France Location within Auvergne-Rhône-Alpes
- Coordinates: 45°49′08″N 3°26′49″E
- Country: France
- Region: Auvergne-Rhône-Alpes
- Department: Puy-de-Dôme
- Arrondissement: Thiers
- Canton: Lezoux
- Intercommunality: Entre Dore et Allier

Government
  - Mayor (2026–32): Bernard Frasiak
- Area^{1}: 11.13 km^{2} (4.30 sq mi)
- Elevation: 368 m (1,207 ft)
- Highest elevation: 423 m (1,388 ft)
- Lowest elevation: 333 m (1,093 ft)
- Population (2023): 703
  - Density: 63.2/km^{2} (164/sq mi)
- Time zone: UTC+01:00 (CET)
  - Summer (DST): UTC+02:00 (CEST)
- INSEE/Postal code: 63364 /63190
- ^{1} French Land Register data, which excludes lakes, ponds, glaciers > 1 km^{2} (0.386 sq mi or 247 acres) and river estuaries.

Saint-Jean-d'Heurs is a commune in the Puy-de-Dôme department in Auvergne in central France.

== See also ==
- Communes of the Puy-de-Dôme department
