= Lempty =

- Commune
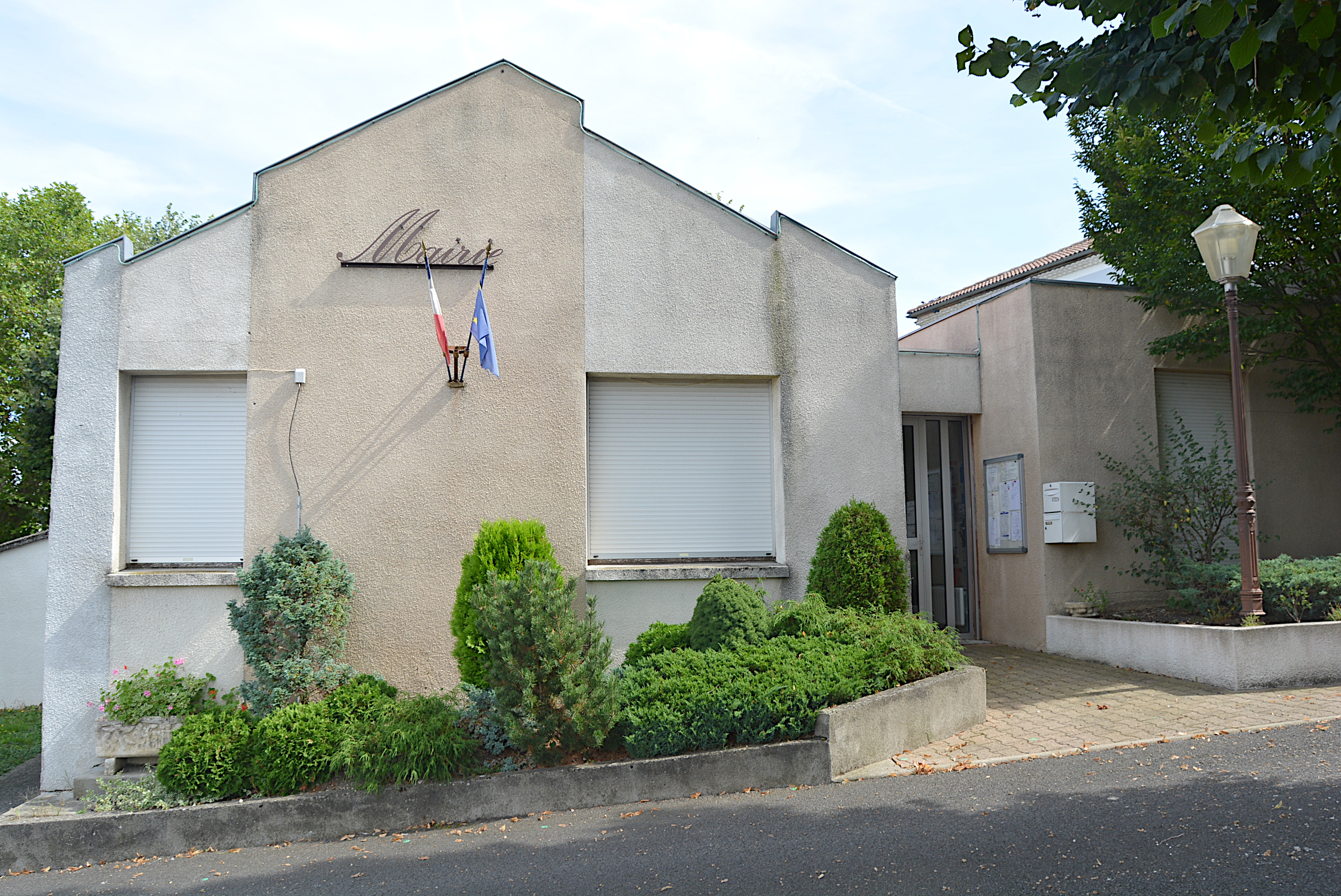
- Town hall

- Coat of arms
- Location of Lempty
- Location within France Location within Auvergne-Rhône-Alpes
- Coordinates: 45°49′42″N 3°19′56″E
- Country: France
- Region: Auvergne-Rhône-Alpes
- Department: Puy-de-Dôme
- Arrondissement: Thiers
- Canton: Lezoux
- Intercommunality: Entre Dore et Allier

Government
  - Mayor (2020–2026): Deolinda De Freitas
- Area^{1}: 4.76 km^{2} (1.84 sq mi)
- Elevation: 320 m (1,050 ft)
- Highest elevation: 372 m (1,220 ft)
- Lowest elevation: 308 m (1,010 ft)
- Population (2023): 417
  - Density: 87.6/km^{2} (227/sq mi)
- Time zone: UTC+01:00 (CET)
  - Summer (DST): UTC+02:00 (CEST)
- INSEE/Postal code: 63194 /63190
- ^{1} French Land Register data, which excludes lakes, ponds, glaciers > 1 km^{2} (0.386 sq mi or 247 acres) and river estuaries.

Lempty is a commune in the Puy-de-Dôme department in Auvergne-Rhône-Alpes in central France.

== See also ==
- Communes of the Puy-de-Dôme department
