= Culhat =

- Commune
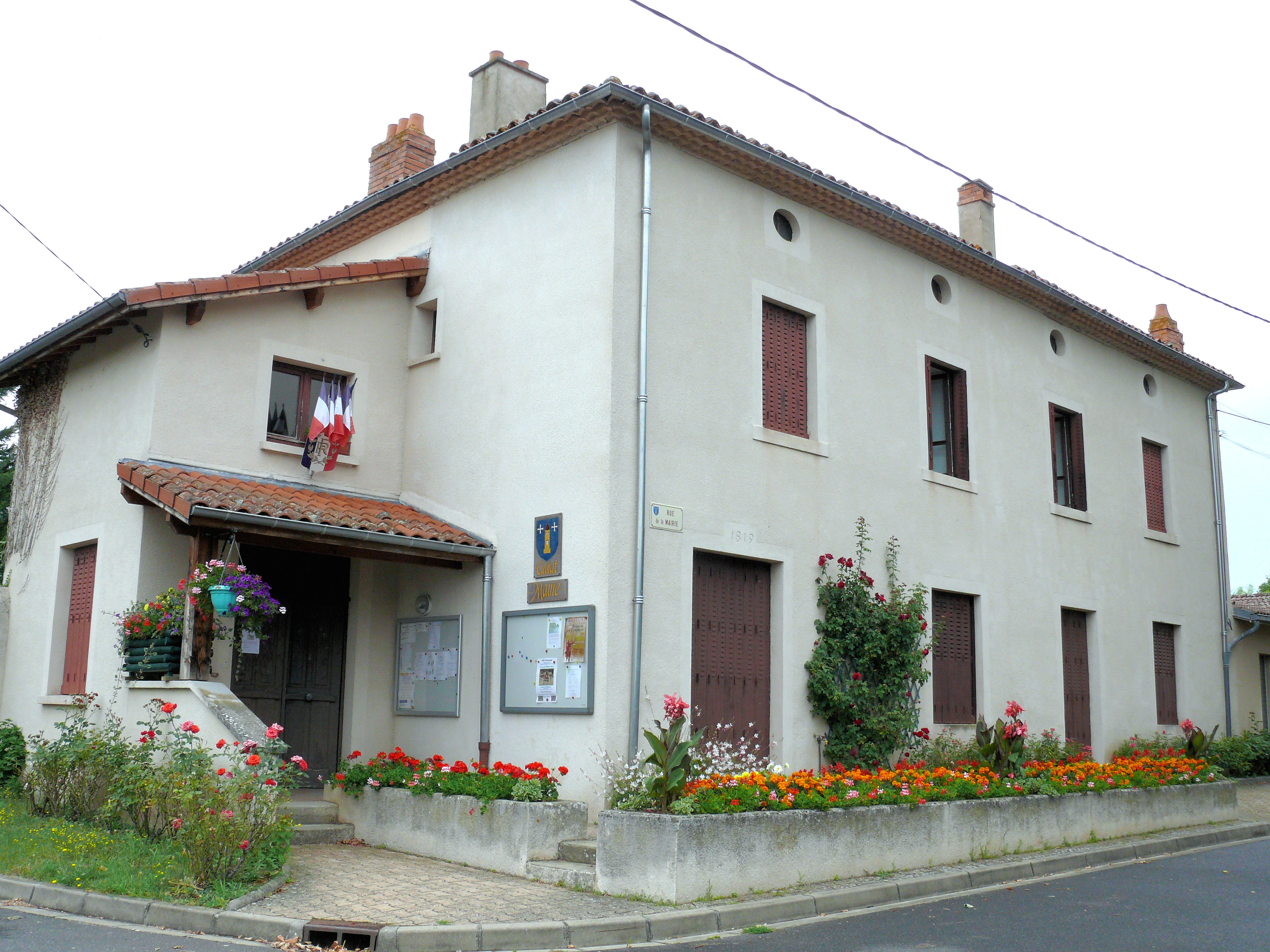
- The town hall in Culhat

- Coat of arms
- Location of Culhat
- Location within France Location within Auvergne-Rhône-Alpes
- Coordinates: 45°51′48″N 3°20′14″E
- Country: France
- Region: Auvergne-Rhône-Alpes
- Department: Puy-de-Dôme
- Arrondissement: Thiers
- Canton: Lezoux
- Intercommunality: Entre Dore et Allier

Government
  - Mayor (2026–32): Gilles Bergami
- Area^{1}: 18.74 km^{2} (7.24 sq mi)
- Elevation: 312 m (1,024 ft)
- Highest elevation: 373 m (1,224 ft)
- Lowest elevation: 289 m (948 ft)
- Population (2023): 1,182
  - Density: 63.07/km^{2} (163.4/sq mi)
- Time zone: UTC+01:00 (CET)
  - Summer (DST): UTC+02:00 (CEST)
- INSEE/Postal code: 63131 /63350
- ^{1} French Land Register data, which excludes lakes, ponds, glaciers > 1 km^{2} (0.386 sq mi or 247 acres) and river estuaries.

Culhat is a commune in the Puy-de-Dôme department in Auvergne-Rhône-Alpes in central France.

== See also ==
- Communes of the Puy-de-Dôme department
