= Bort-l'Étang =

- Commune
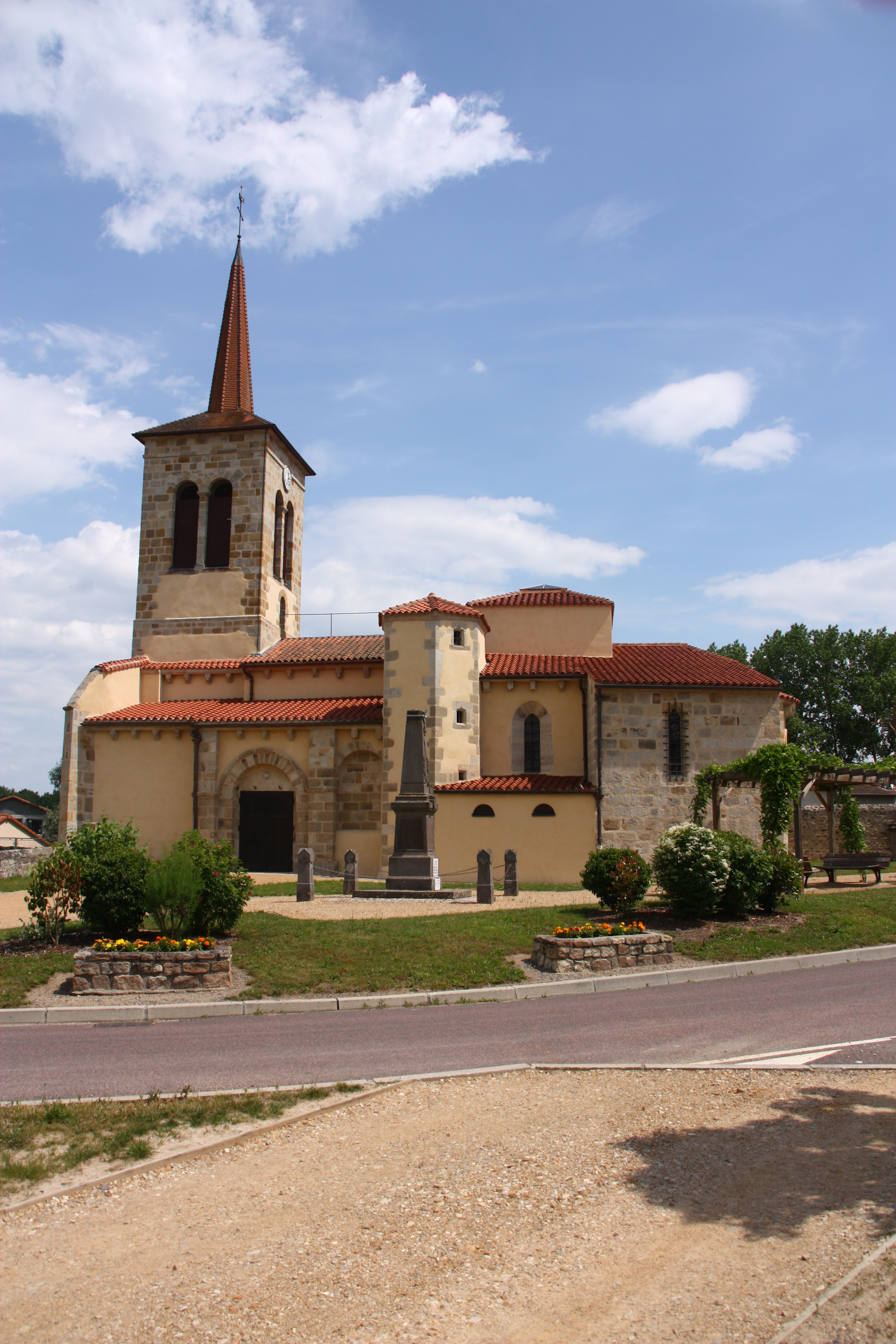
- The church in Bort-l'Étang
- Location of Bort-l'Étang
- Location within France Location within Auvergne-Rhône-Alpes
- Coordinates: 45°47′02″N 3°25′43″E
- Country: France
- Region: Auvergne-Rhône-Alpes
- Department: Puy-de-Dôme
- Arrondissement: Thiers
- Canton: Lezoux
- Intercommunality: Entre Dore et Allier

Government
  - Mayor (2020–2026): Josiane Huguet
- Area^{1}: 15.40 km^{2} (5.95 sq mi)
- Elevation: 350 m (1,150 ft)
- Highest elevation: 424 m (1,391 ft)
- Lowest elevation: 333 m (1,093 ft)
- Population (2023): 727
  - Density: 47.2/km^{2} (122/sq mi)
- Time zone: UTC+01:00 (CET)
  - Summer (DST): UTC+02:00 (CEST)
- INSEE/Postal code: 63045 /63190
- ^{1} French Land Register data, which excludes lakes, ponds, glaciers > 1 km^{2} (0.386 sq mi or 247 acres) and river estuaries.

Bort-l'Étang (French pronunciation: [bɔʁ letɑ̃]) is a commune in the Puy-de-Dôme department in Auvergne-Rhône-Alpes in central France.

== Population ==
Historical population
Year	Pop.	±% p.a.
1968	412	—
1975	412	+0.00%
1982	397	−0.53%
1990	409	+0.37%
1999	445	+0.94%
2007	526	+2.11%
2012	606	+2.87%
2017	657	+1.63%
2023	727	+1.70%
Source: INSEE

== See also ==
- Communes of the Puy-de-Dôme department
