= Peschadoires =

- Commune
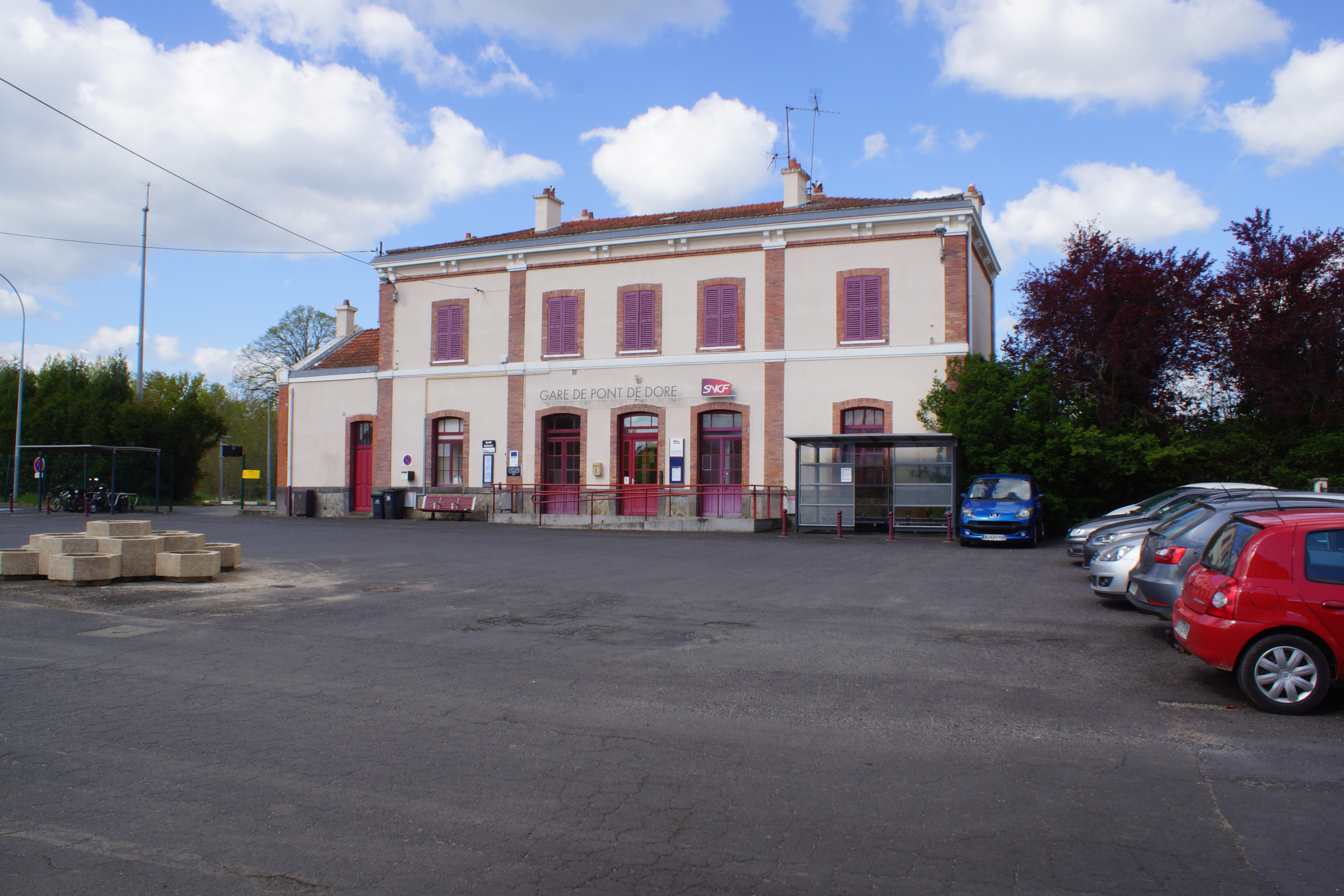
- Peschadoires Town hall
- Location of Peschadoires
- Location within France Location within Auvergne-Rhône-Alpes
- Coordinates: 45°49′37″N 3°29′35″E
- Country: France
- Region: Auvergne-Rhône-Alpes
- Department: Puy-de-Dôme
- Arrondissement: Thiers
- Canton: Lezoux
- Intercommunality: Entre Dore et Allier

Government
  - Mayor (2026–32): Florent Moneyron
- Area^{1}: 20.67 km^{2} (7.98 sq mi)
- Elevation: 315 m (1,033 ft)
- Highest elevation: 424 m (1,391 ft)
- Lowest elevation: 280 m (920 ft)
- Population (2023): 2,104
  - Density: 101.8/km^{2} (263.6/sq mi)
- Time zone: UTC+01:00 (CET)
  - Summer (DST): UTC+02:00 (CEST)
- INSEE/Postal code: 63276 /63920
- ^{1} French Land Register data, which excludes lakes, ponds, glaciers > 1 km^{2} (0.386 sq mi or 247 acres) and river estuaries.

Peschadoires (French pronunciation: [pɛʃadwaʁ]; Occitan: Peschadoira) is a commune in the Puy-de-Dôme department in Auvergne in central France.

== Population ==
Historical population
Year	Pop.	±% p.a.
1968	1,413	—
1975	1,539	+1.23%
1982	1,695	+1.39%
1990	1,856	+1.14%
1999	1,943	+0.51%
2007	2,006	+0.40%
2012	2,091	+0.83%
2017	2,132	+0.39%
2023	2,104	−0.22%
Source: INSEE

== See also ==
- Communes of the Puy-de-Dôme department
