= Seychalles =

- Commune
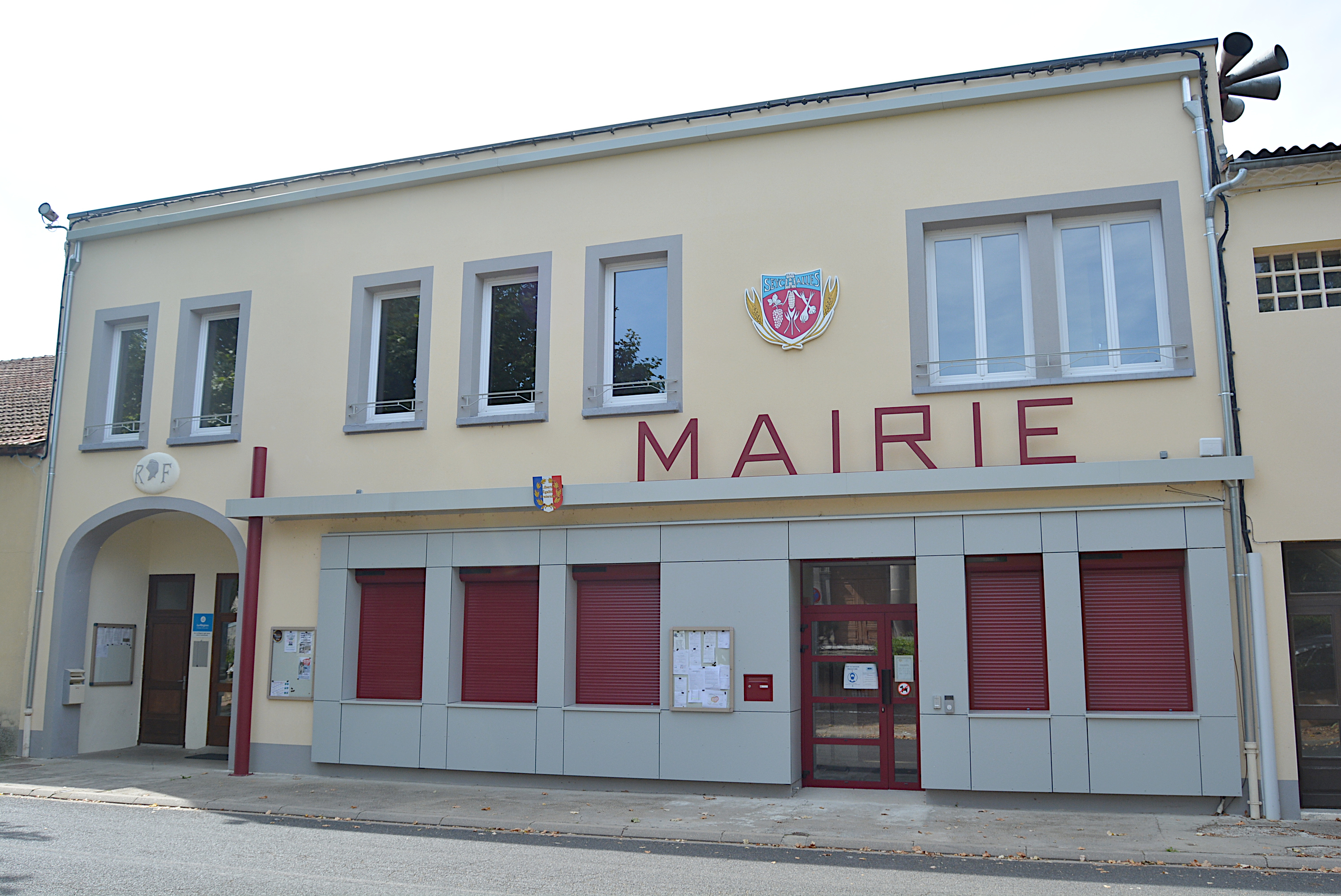
- Town hall
- Location of Seychalles
- Location within France Location within Auvergne-Rhône-Alpes
- Coordinates: 45°48′23″N 3°20′22″E
- Country: France
- Region: Auvergne-Rhône-Alpes
- Department: Puy-de-Dôme
- Arrondissement: Thiers
- Canton: Lezoux
- Intercommunality: Entre Dore et Allier

Government
  - Mayor (2026–32): Yannick Dupoué
- Area^{1}: 9.21 km^{2} (3.56 sq mi)
- Elevation: 320 m (1,050 ft)
- Highest elevation: 461 m (1,512 ft)
- Lowest elevation: 314 m (1,030 ft)
- Population (2023): 785
  - Density: 85.2/km^{2} (221/sq mi)
- Time zone: UTC+01:00 (CET)
  - Summer (DST): UTC+02:00 (CEST)
- INSEE/Postal code: 63420 /63190
- ^{1} French Land Register data, which excludes lakes, ponds, glaciers > 1 km^{2} (0.386 sq mi or 247 acres) and river estuaries.

Seychalles (French pronunciation: [seʃal]; Occitan: Seichalas) is a commune in the Puy-de-Dôme department in Auvergne-Rhône-Alpes in central France.

== See also ==
- Communes of the Puy-de-Dôme department
