= Moissat =

- Commune
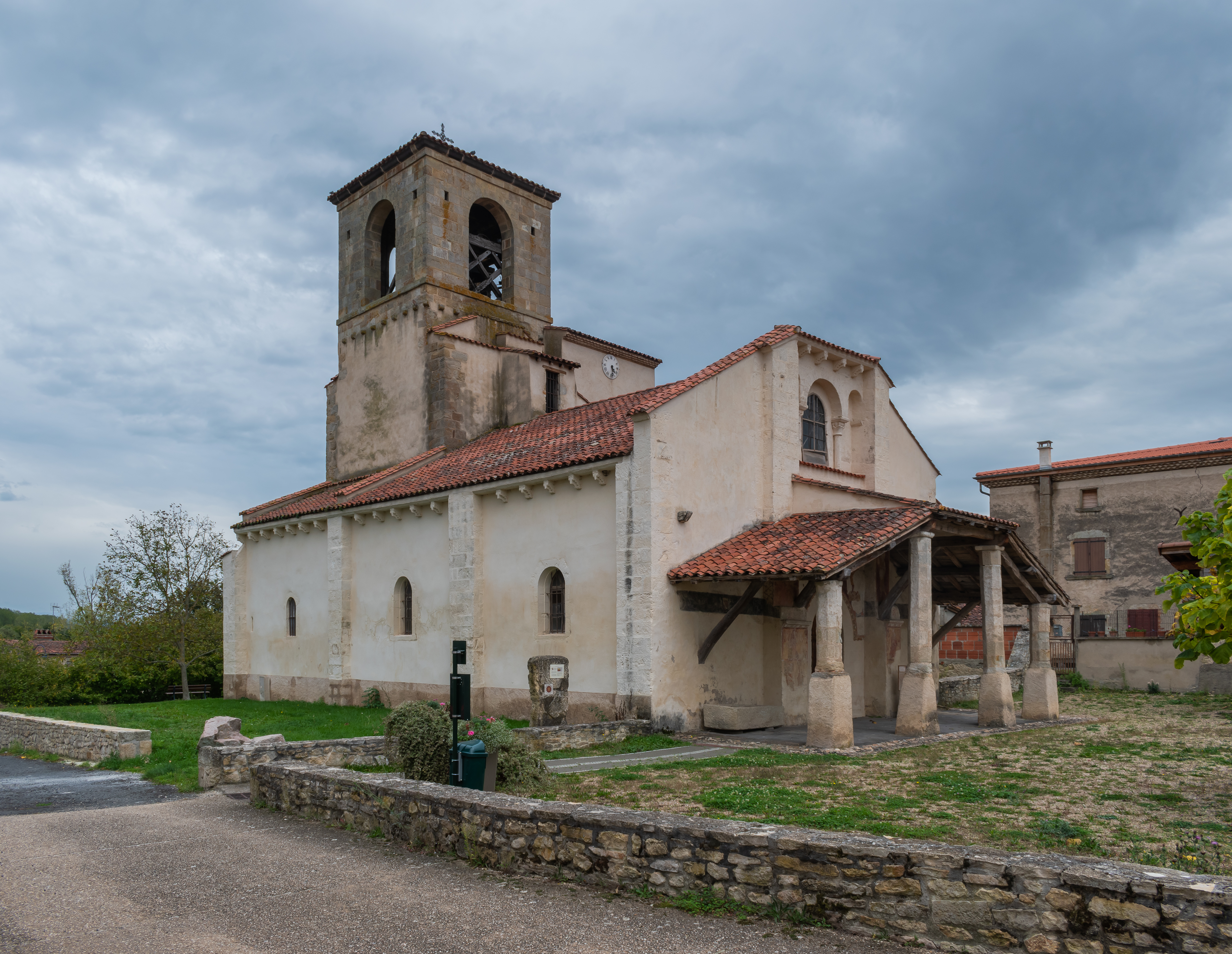
- The church in Moissat

- Coat of arms
- Location of Moissat
- Location within France Location within Auvergne-Rhône-Alpes
- Coordinates: 45°46′42″N 3°21′32″E
- Country: France
- Region: Auvergne-Rhône-Alpes
- Department: Puy-de-Dôme
- Arrondissement: Thiers
- Canton: Lezoux
- Intercommunality: Entre Dore et Allier

Government
  - Mayor (2020–2026): Olivier Jeanvoine
- Area^{1}: 13 km^{2} (5.0 sq mi)
- Elevation: 340 m (1,120 ft)
- Highest elevation: 395 m (1,296 ft)
- Lowest elevation: 317 m (1,040 ft)
- Population (2023): 1,253
  - Density: 96/km^{2} (250/sq mi)
- Time zone: UTC+01:00 (CET)
  - Summer (DST): UTC+02:00 (CEST)
- INSEE/Postal code: 63229 /63190
- ^{1} French Land Register data, which excludes lakes, ponds, glaciers > 1 km^{2} (0.386 sq mi or 247 acres) and river estuaries.

Moissat (French pronunciation: [mwasa]) is a commune in the Puy-de-Dôme department in Auvergne in central France.

== See also ==
- Communes of the Puy-de-Dôme department
