= Vinzelles, Puy-de-Dôme =

Vinzelles
- Commune
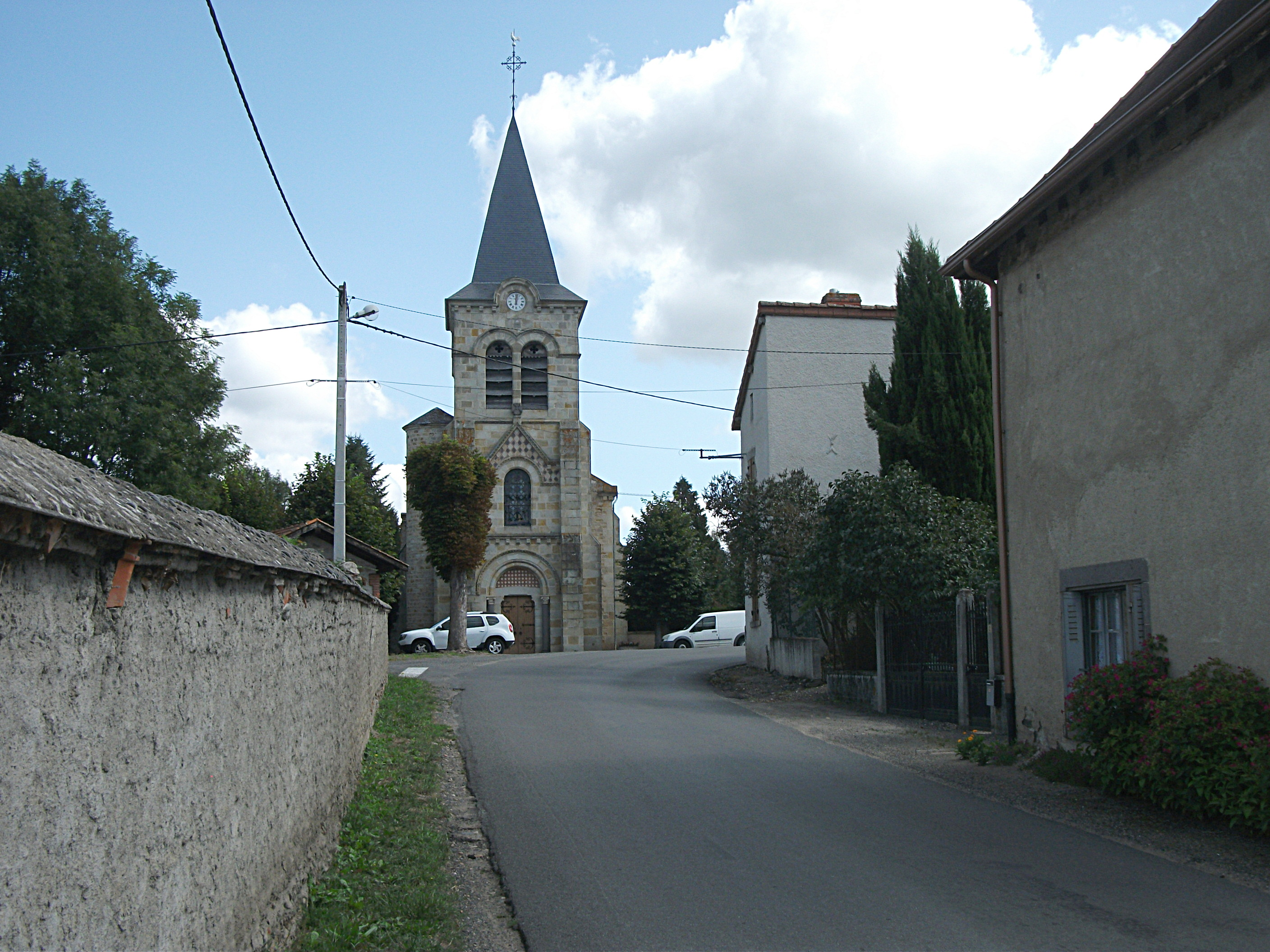
- The church in Vinzelles

- Coat of arms
- Location of Vinzelles
- Location within France Location within Auvergne-Rhône-Alpes
- Coordinates: 45°55′34″N 3°23′53″E
- Country: France
- Region: Auvergne-Rhône-Alpes
- Department: Puy-de-Dôme
- Arrondissement: Thiers
- Canton: Lezoux
- Intercommunality: Entre Dore et Allier

Government
  - Mayor (2026–32): Laurence Goninet
- Area^{1}: 13.46 km^{2} (5.20 sq mi)
- Elevation: 288 m (945 ft)
- Highest elevation: 354 m (1,161 ft)
- Lowest elevation: 272 m (892 ft)
- Population (2023): 373
  - Density: 27.7/km^{2} (71.8/sq mi)
- Time zone: UTC+01:00 (CET)
  - Summer (DST): UTC+02:00 (CEST)
- INSEE/Postal code: 63461 /63350
- ^{1} French Land Register data, which excludes lakes, ponds, glaciers > 1 km^{2} (0.386 sq mi or 247 acres) and river estuaries.

Vinzelles (French pronunciation: [vɛ̃zɛl]; Occitan: Vinzèla) is a commune in the Puy-de-Dôme department in Auvergne in central France.

== See also ==
- Communes of the Puy-de-Dôme department
