= Canton of Lezoux =

Coordinates: 45.83°N 3.38°E

The canton of Lezoux is an administrative division of the Puy-de-Dôme department, central France. Its borders were modified at the French canton reorganisation which came into effect in March 2015. Its seat is in Lezoux.

It consists of the following communes:

1. Bort-l'Étang
2. Bulhon
3. Crevant-Laveine
4. Culhat
5. Joze
6. Lempty
7. Lezoux
8. Moissat
9. Orléat
10. Peschadoires
11. Ravel
12. Saint-Jean-d'Heurs
13. Seychalles
14. Vinzelles
