= Paslières =

- Commune
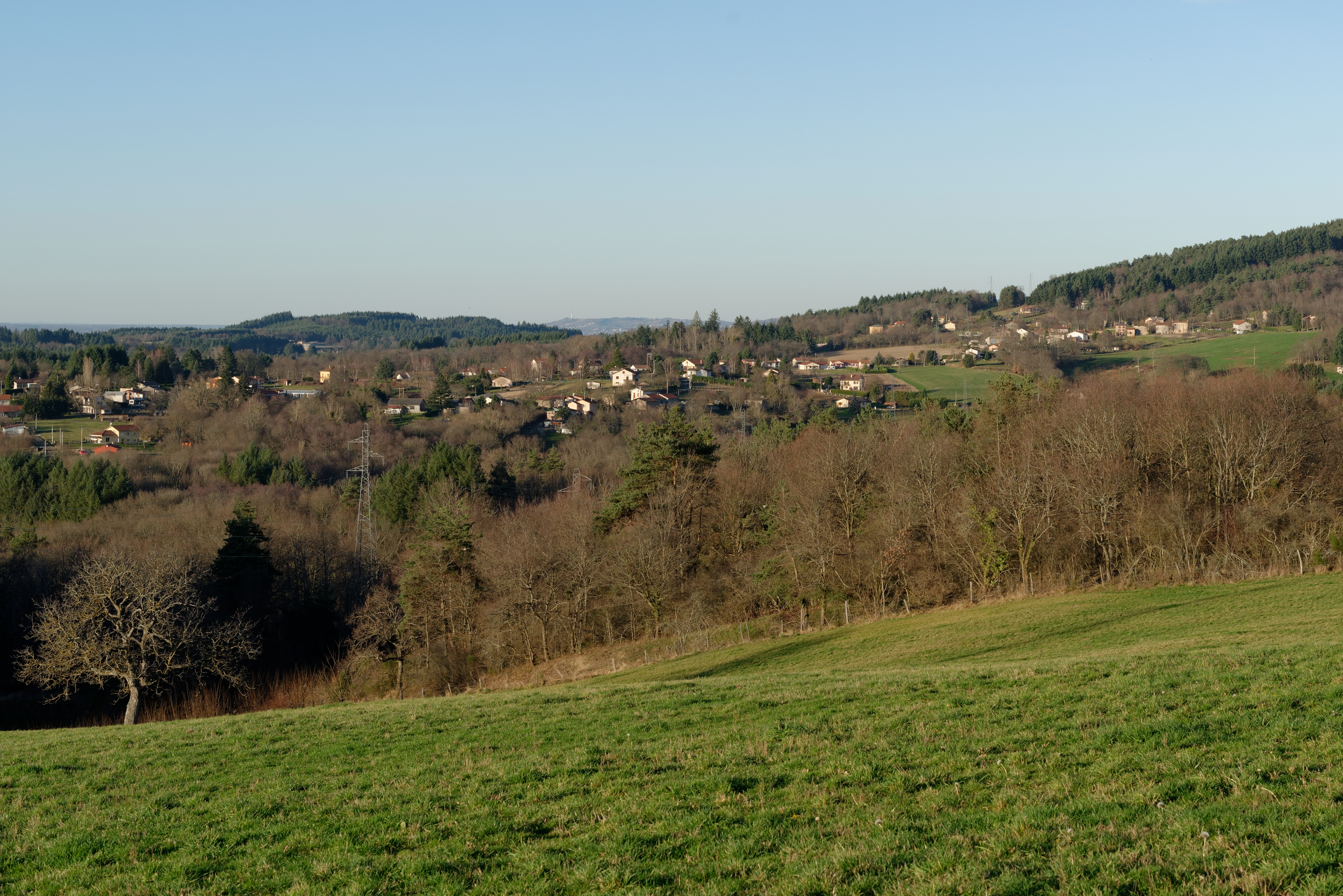
- The hamlets of Joub and Bazelet in Paslières

- Coat of arms
- Location of Paslières
- Location within France Location within Auvergne-Rhône-Alpes
- Coordinates: 45°55′44″N 3°29′53″E
- Country: France
- Region: Auvergne-Rhône-Alpes
- Department: Puy-de-Dôme
- Arrondissement: Thiers
- Canton: Maringues

Government
  - Mayor (2026–32): Patrick Sauzedde
- Area^{1}: 27.77 km^{2} (10.72 sq mi)
- Elevation: 420 m (1,380 ft)
- Highest elevation: 800 m (2,600 ft)
- Lowest elevation: 275 m (902 ft)
- Population (2023): 1,491
  - Density: 53.69/km^{2} (139.1/sq mi)
- Time zone: UTC+01:00 (CET)
  - Summer (DST): UTC+02:00 (CEST)
- INSEE/Postal code: 63271 /63290
- ^{1} French Land Register data, which excludes lakes, ponds, glaciers > 1 km^{2} (0.386 sq mi or 247 acres) and river estuaries.

Paslières ([paljɛʁ]) is a commune in the Puy-de-Dôme department in Auvergne in central France.

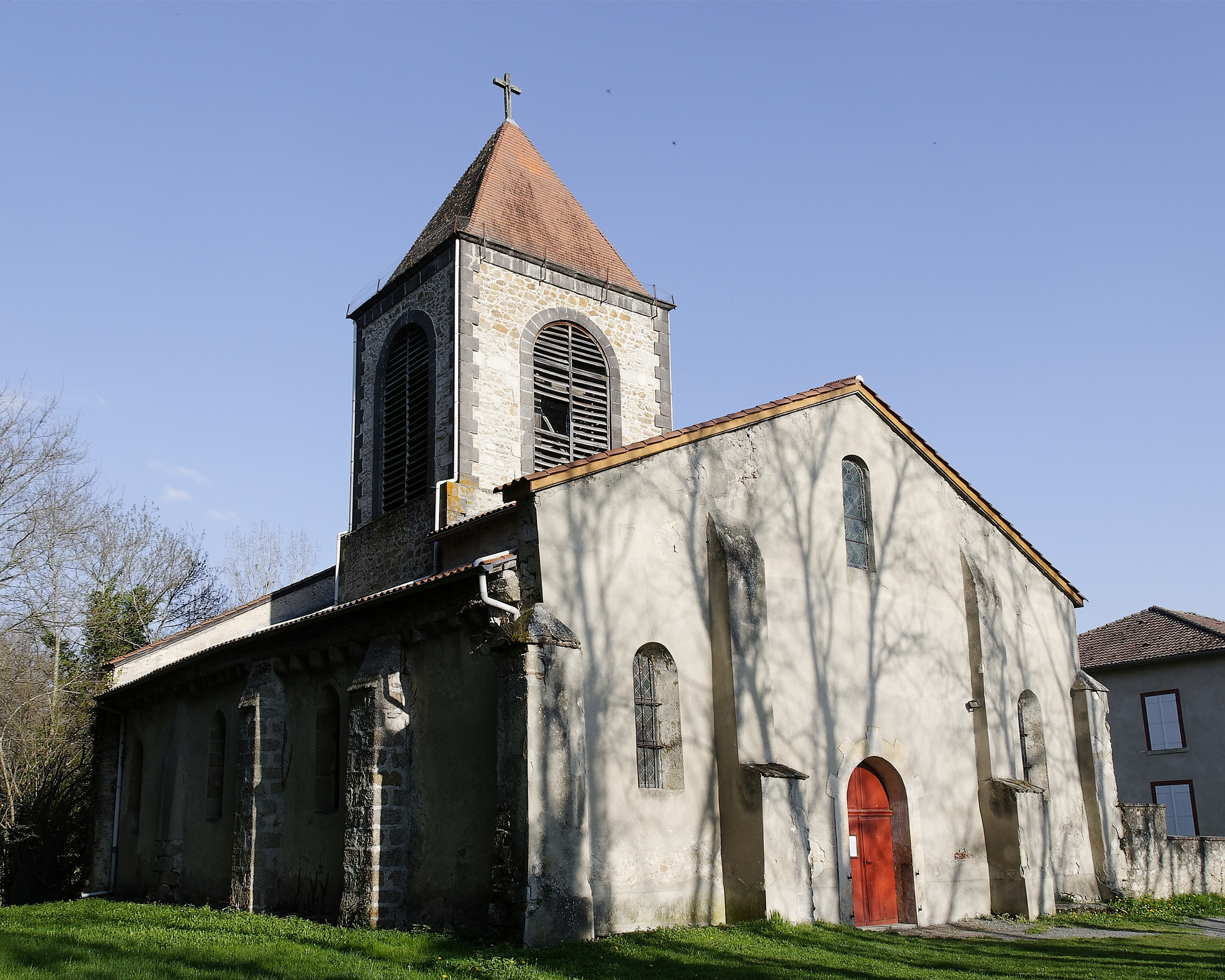
Saint-Bonnet church, hamlet of Croix Saint-Bonnet

== See also ==
- Communes of the Puy-de-Dôme department
