= List of French sheep breeds =

This is a list of some of the breeds of sheep considered in France to be wholly or partly of French origin. Some may have complex or obscure histories, so inclusion here does not necessarily imply that a breed is predominantly or exclusively French.

- Aure et Campan
- Avranchin
- Barégeoise
- Basco-Béarnaise
- Belle Ile
- Berrichon de l'Indre
- Berrichon du Cher
- Bizet
- Blanc du Massif Central
- Bleu du Maine
- Boulonnaise
- Brigasque
- Castillonnaise
- Caussenarde des Garrigues
- Causses du Lot
- Charmoise
- Charollais
- Commune des Alpes
- Corse
- Cotentin
- Est à Laine Mérinos
- Grivette
- Ile-de-France
- Lacaune Lait
- Lacaune Viande
- Landaise
- Landes de Bretagne
- Limousine
- Lourdaise
- Manech Tête Noire
- Manech Tête Rousse
- Martinik
- Montagne Noire
- Mourerous
- Mérinos d'Arles
- Mérinos de Rambouillet
- Mérinos Précoce
- Noir du Velay
- Ouessant
- PréAlpes du Sud
- Raiole
- Rambouillet
- Rava sheep
- Rouge de l'Ouest
- Rouge du Roussillon
- Roussin de La Hague
- Sasi Ardi
- Solognote
- Southdown Français
- Tarasconnaise
- Thônes et Marthod
- Vendéen

== Extinct breeds ==
- Alfort
- Ardes
- Artois
- Boischaut
- Brenne
- Cambrai
- Campan
- Cauchois
- Caussenard de la Lozère
- Champagne
- Châtillonais
- Choletais
- Corbières
- Crevant
- Franconie
- Gascon
- Larzac
- Lauraguais
- Maine à Tête Blanche
- Marchois
- Mérinos Champenois
- Mérinos de la Camargue
- Mérinos de Mauchamp
- Mérinos du Naz
- Morvandelle
- Moutons à Tête Noire
- Picard
- Roussillon Merino
- Ruthenois
- Ségala
- Soissonais
- St. Quentin
- Trun
