= Blanche du Massif Central =

French breed of sheep

- Ewes and lambs in the Lozère
- Conservation status: FAO (2007): not at risk; DAD-IS (2026): not at risk
- Other names: Blanc de Lozère; Blanc du Massif Central; Blanche de Lozère; Caussenard de la Lozère; Causses de la Lozère; Lozèrien; Race des Montagnes de la Lozère
- Country of origin: France
- Distribution: Ardèche; Cantal; Drôme; Gard; Haute-Loire; Hérault; Lot; Lozère; Puy de Dôme
- Use: dual-purpose, wool and meat

Traits
- Weight: Male: 90–140 kg; Female: 55–80 kg
- Height: Male: average 95 cm; Female: average 85 cm
- Skin colour: unpigmented
- Wool colour: white
- Face colour: white
- Horn status: polled in both sexes

The Blanche du Massif Central is a traditional French breed of sheep. It originates in the Margeride mountains of the Massif Central in south-central France and was formerly known as the Blanche de Lozère. It is a dual-purpose sheep, reared both for meat and for wool. It is one of six traditional rustic sheep breeds of the massif, the others being the Bizet, the Grivette, the Limousine, the Noire du Velay and the Rava.

== History ==
The Blanche du Massif Central is a traditional rustic breed of the mountainous Margeride region of the Massif Central, originally of the départements of the Cantal, of the Haute-Loire and of the Lozère – from which its former name Blanche de Lozère derives. It derives from the Caussenardes, the large and variable traditional sheep population of the Causses – the series of infertile limestone plateaux to the south and south-west of the Massif Central. It is closely similar to both the Préalpes and the Lacaune, which share similar origins.

It later spread into the départements of the Ardèche, the Drôme, the Gard, the Hérault, the Lot and the Puy de Dôme, and was renamed the Blanche du Massif Central.

A breed standard was drawn up in 1967 and the breed was officially recognised in 1975; a flock-book was started in 1976. A breed society – Organisme de Sélection Races Ovines des Massifs or ROM Sélection – was established in 1997 for all six of the traditional rustic sheep breeds of the Massif Central: the Bizet, the Blanche du Massif Central, the Grivette, the Limousine, the Noire du Velay and the Rava.

In 2023 the total number of the sheep was reported to DAD-IS at between 46000 and 52000 head, with 42817 breeding ewes and 2558 active rams; a small number are in Poland. Other sources give a figure of 350000 or more for ewes alone. In 2026 the conservation status of the breed was listed as 'not at risk'.

== Characteristics ==
The sheep are entirely white, with an unpigmented (pink) nose and mucosae; the face and legs are free of wool, the ears are long and are held slightly below the horizontal. Both ewes and rams are polled. The facial profile is slightly convex in ewes, more markedly so in rams.

Body weights vary from 55 to 80 kg for ewes and from 90 to 140 kg; average heights at the withers are about 85 cm and 95 cm respectively.

== Use ==
It is a dual-purpose sheep and may be milked; dairy qualities are among the breeding aims. It is however reared principally for meat, either pure-bred or by crossing with a ram of a meat breed. Lambs are slaughtered at about 90 days, when they weigh some 30 to 38 kg; some are exported to Italy and Spain at a rather lower weight, about 25 kg. Prolificity is in the range 1.33 to 1.46.

The fleece is light, weighing some 1 to 2.5 kg; the staple length is usually between 50 and 70 mm. The wool is of medium quality.
