= Rava sheep =

French sheep breed

Rava
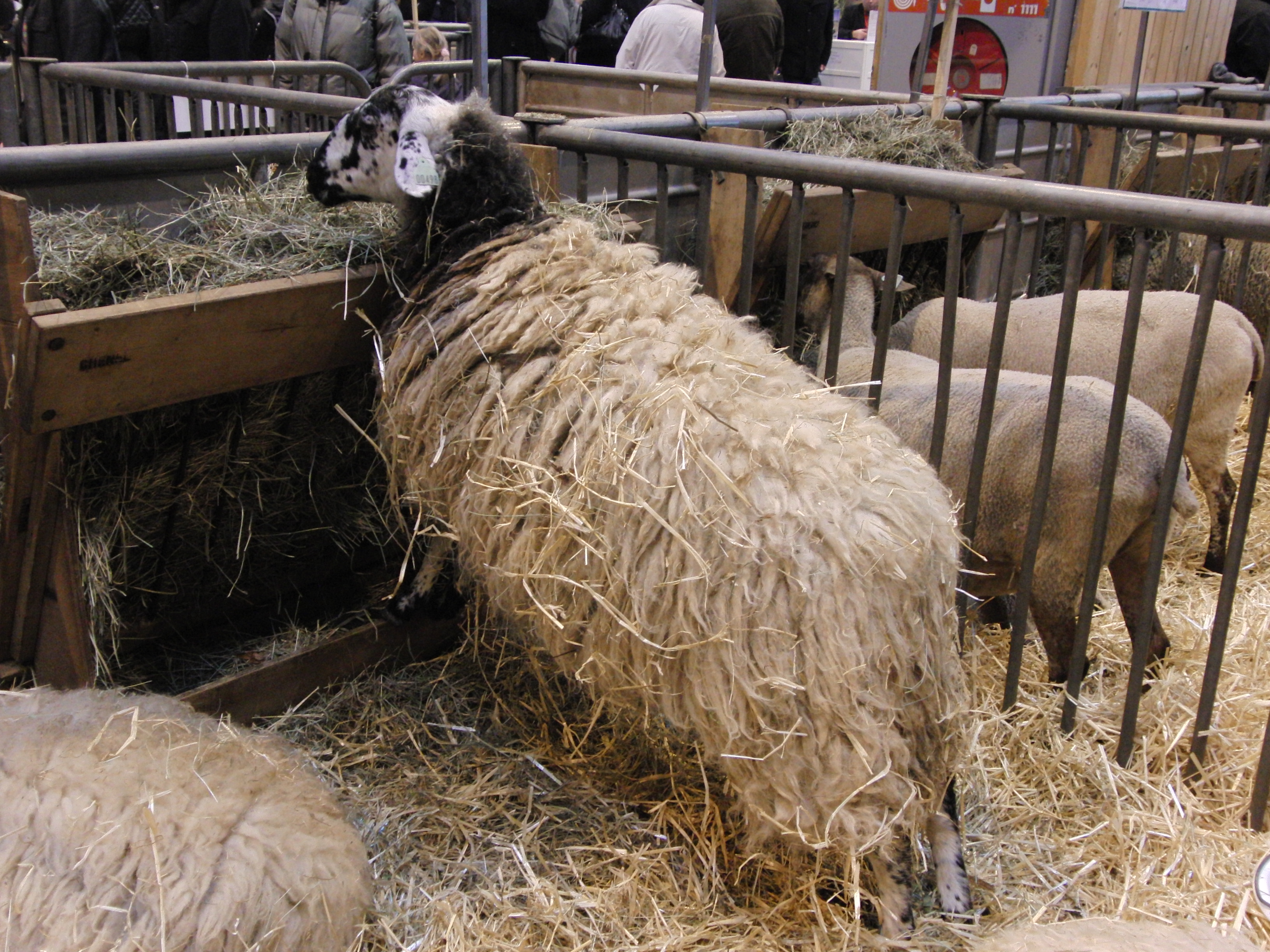
- Brebis Rava
- Conservation status: Not endangered
- Country of origin: France
- Use: Meat

Traits
- Skin color: White and black
- Wool color: White
- Horn status: None

The Rava is a French sheep breed originating from the Massif Central, more specifically from the Chaîne des Puys in the Puy-de-Dôme region. It is characterized by its white fleece with long locks and coarse, garlicky wool, and its bare head marked with black spots. This breed is particularly hardy and well-suited to breeding in the sometimes harsh conditions of its birthplace. In fact, when sent to summer pastures in the Auvergne Volcanoes Regional Nature Park, it helps to maintain the landscape at a lower cost. It is bred as a purebred or crossbred to improve the conformation of lambs destined for the southeastern French market. It almost disappeared, absorbed by crossbreeding with beef breeds to improve conformation, but today seems to be preserved, with around 33,000 to 40,000 sheep in 2000.

== Origin and history ==
=== Name origin ===
Depending on the author, the breed's name is written Rava as an invariable proper noun or, indifferently, Rava or Ravat, with agreement in the plural. Ravat, as well as rabas, rabat, ravas, is in fact an Occitan dialect word used in southeastern France (Provence, Dauphiné, Cévennes, Forez, and perhaps also Auvergne) to designate, among other things, a "sheep with coarse, hanging wool (the skin of this sheep) common in Piedmont, Lombardy and Savoy". The term ravat is also used with this meaning by ancient authors to designate a coarse sheep population in the southeast and Piedmont.

Another meaning of the Occitan word ravat is interesting to consider, namely that of an animal, the badger: indeed, the term badger in this particular case refers to sheep breeds with a particular black-and-white facial variegation, known in English as badger-faced sheep, even if the irregular variegation of today's Rava is different from that of its British congeners in which the badger-face character has been fixed.

=== Breed origin ===
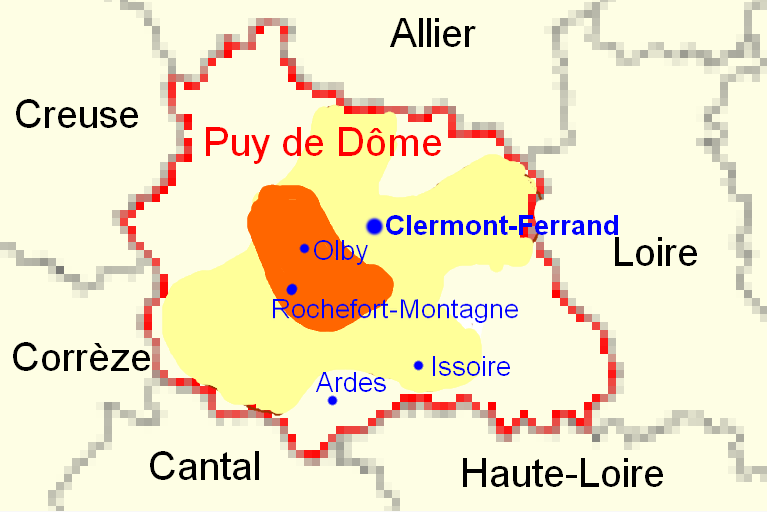
Areas of dominance (ochre) and presence (yellow) of Rava in 1965

The Rava is originally from the Chaîne des Puys in the Puy-de-Dôme region. In the past, it was particularly represented around Olby, which is considered the breed's cradle. The geographical map published by Quittet in 1965 shows the breed's area of dominance and presence in the Puy-de-Dôme at that time. This is a mountain breed, which spends the summer in summer pastures at altitudes of between 1,200 and 1,500 m, and descends to lower-altitude areas in winter.

André Sanson, a zootechnician and morphologist in the second half of the 19th century, is the author of a classification of sheep breeds whose groupings have retained a certain relevance. He described a "Central Plateau breed", zoologically designated Ovis aries arvernensis, into which he distinguished several varieties: the Auvergne, including different types such as the Rava, which is presented as a type or sub-variety in the Puy-de-Dôme, the Marchoise in Creuse, the Limousine in Haute-Vienne, the Saintongeoise in Charentes and the Bizet in Haute-Loire (the Noire du Velay, formerly known as the Mouton de Bains, is ignored). Comparing the spread of this ethnic group with the migrations of Celtic peoples has not been verified, and is not based on any serious foundation, even though the interest this mention may arouse has led to references to it in notices presenting these breeds.

In fact, the conclusion that can be drawn from reading various texts by ancient authors who have dealt with the Rava or "Rava sheep" is that they have long constituted a highly composite and mixed sheep population whose dominant traits were a "coarse constitution" combined with "very great rusticity and frugality". The origin of the term rava also confirms this original identity. In 1911, in his book on ovine zootechnics, Paul Diffloth mentions the Rava in the following terms: "In the Puy de Dôme, there was a local variety known as the Rava, which was mainly farmed between Volvic, Rochefort and Pontgibaut. Small in size, the rustic and undemanding Rava had a broad, stocky conformation. The small head, with a straight chamfer, was adorned with developed horns; the fleece, weighing 1.5 kg, was very coarse and very long; the sheep weighed 25 to 30 kilograms. This ovine population mixed with sheep from Corrèze and Haut-Limousin, where the rather famous sheep were distinguished by the presence of a black circle around the eyes; rams from the Causses de Larzac were even imported, so that the Auvergne's ovine contingent is one of the most mixed and least defined". In 1983, Quittet and Franck wrote: "Should we speak of the Ravas as a race or just a population? It's debatable".

Race or population, the Rava's originality and identity were forged around its exceptional hardiness and maternal qualities. This situation almost changed in the 1950s, when it was decided to crossbreed sheep with rams of beef breeds to improve lamb conformation, without keeping sufficient numbers of replacement females. The animals resulting from crossbreeding with Charmoise and Southdown, in particular, were not adapted to the difficult environment in which the breed lived, and the breed almost disappeared. However, lambs of this very precocious breed would sometimes serve as sheep before being slaughtered, thus preserving a core of purebred animals. This cross-breeding stopped in the 1970s, and the breed has since been developing slowly in its original mountains.

The Rava breeders' association, created in 1971, played an important role in this revival and in the selection of the breed, which then began to organize itself. The Rava section of UPRA (Unité Pour La Race, by its extension in French) Races ovines des massifs was created in 1973, and the breed standard was defined in 1975. A breeding center for rams intended for reproduction was set up the following year, and the foundations of a selection base were laid in 1986. Since then, the breed has benefited from a functional selection scheme, and numbers have risen again, reaching an estimated 33,000 to 40,000 sheep in 2000.

== Description ==
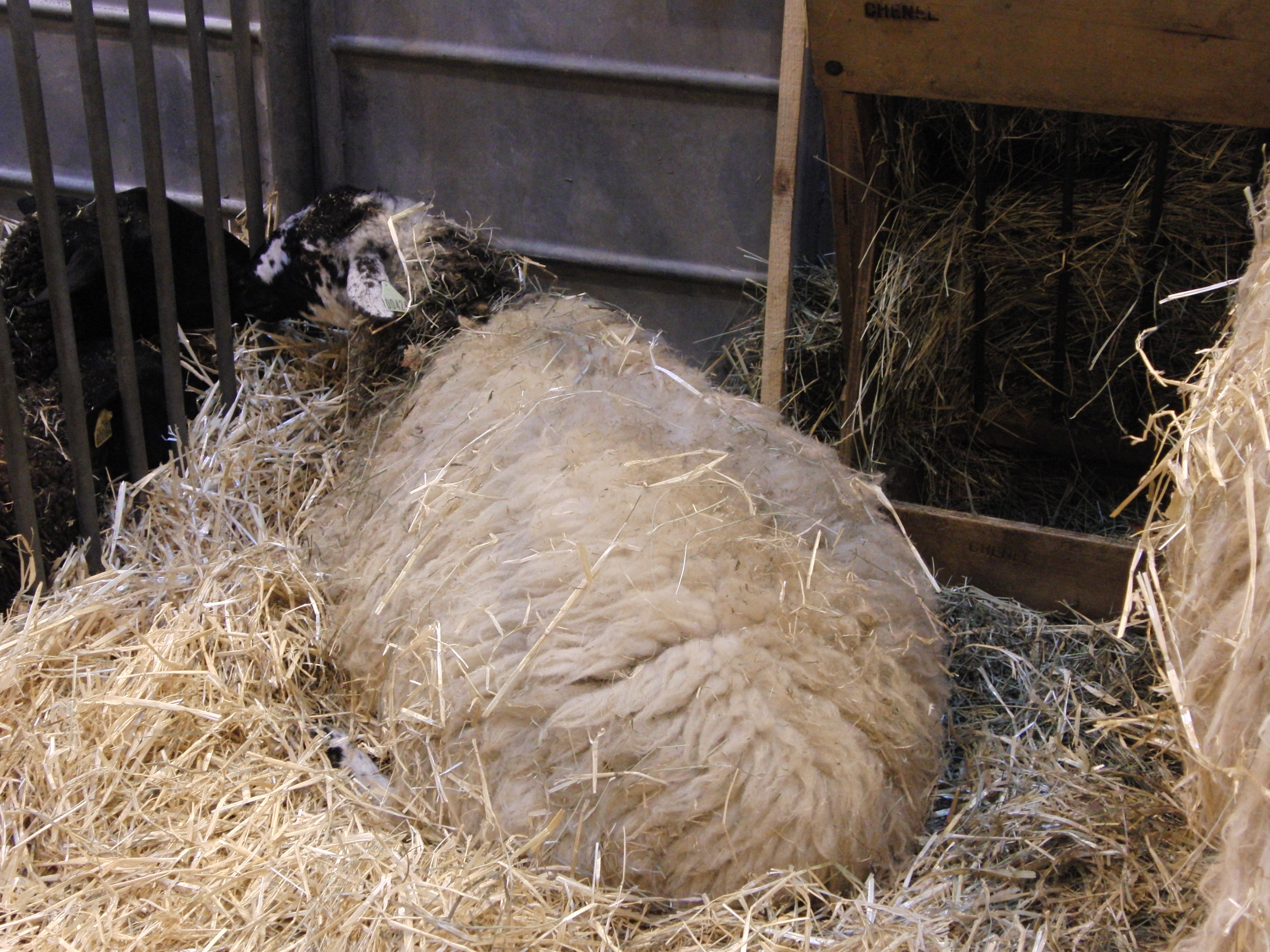
Rava sheep at the 2011 Paris International Agricultural Show

Here is the official breed standard, as presented in Gilles Perret's 1986 book on sheep breeds:

- Head: rather fine, without wool, marked with black spots, sometimes russet, sometimes limited to the eye area, sometimes extending to almost completely invade the face; forehead a little rounded, horns rare, especially in sheep; ears medium-sized and carried horizontally; eyes not very prominent; muzzle with slightly arched profile.
- Neck: long, slender neck.
- Rump: straight back, broad loins.
- Tail: with tapering attachment.
- Bones: fine.
- Limbs: always marked with spots of the same color as those on the head.
- Wool: coarse, long-stapled.
- Fleece: white, often mixed with brown or dark gray tufts, with long, open locks, stopping well above the knee and hock, freeing the nape of the neck and underside of the belly.
- Size: medium. Adult sheep: 50 to 60 kg, adult rams: 70 to 85 kg.

In the 2000s, the weights presented by the UPRA Races Ovines des Massifs, responsible for breed selection, were slightly higher, at 60 and 75 kg for sheep and between 80 and 100 kg for males, probably due to selection objectives and results aimed at increasing the breed's size.

== Selection ==
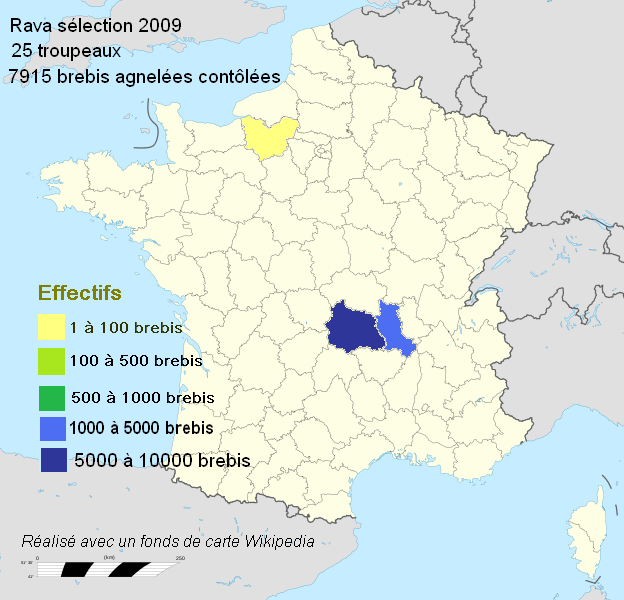
Distribution of Rava sheep under performance control in 2009

The breed's selection scheme is managed by a selection organization (SO) called ROM Sélection (Races Ovines de Massifs - Sélection by its extension in French). This name has replaced UPRA des Races Ovines des Massifs. This organization jointly looks after six hardy sheep breeds from the Massif Central: Blanche du Massif Central, Limousine, Grivette, Rava, Noire du Velay and Bizet. The Rava section manages the breed's herd book and sets selection objectives. These include improving sheep' milk production, size, prolificacy and resistance to scrapie.

In 2009, 25 flocks were registered for performance testing. They held 7,915 controlled ewe lambs, distributed as shown on the attached map (24 flocks and 8,030 sheep in 2010, including 20 flocks and 7,809 sheep enrolled in the SO, with the same distribution). It can also count on the Riom young ram breeding center, which each year gathers 40 to 50 rams chosen according to their ancestry and checks their performance, in order to select the best to supply the artificial insemination cooperative.

In its group of six Races ovines de Massifs, after the Blanche du Massif Central, the Rava breed has the most sheep subject to performance testing: 8,030 sheep lambed in 24 flocks in 2010. In a general context of declining sheep farming in France since 1980, it is also one of the breeds whose selection base has been relatively well maintained:

Change in the number of sheep controlled by the Races de Massifs and national rank from 1980 to 2010
Breed	2010		2009		2000		1990		1980	
Breed	Number of sheep	Ranking	Number of sheep	Ranking	Number of sheep	Ranking	Number of sheep	Ranking	Number of sheep	Ranking
Blanche du Massif central (BMC)	24,432	2	26,244	2	38,800	1	40,485	1	23,641	5
Rava	8,030	10	7,915	10	8,895	14	7,874	14	4,344	18
Limousine	6,510	13	7,168	12	12,756	8	14,003	8	21,597	6
Noire du Velay	6,207	14	6,424	14	9,314	13	6,553	15	5,855	15
Grivette	6,000	16	5,872	16	6,989	17	4,802	18	39	39
Bizet	3,319	21	3,161	21	4,139	19	3,211	19	2,458	20

== Aptitudes ==
=== Hardiness ===
Rava's main characteristic is its hardiness, which is related to its ability to adapt to its very restrictive breeding environment: quality feed resources in very limited quantities, often coarse fodder, long wintering periods. It is one of the hardy French sheep breeds best adapted to making the most of the most diverse and unconventional roughages provided by the local natural flora, from tree foliage to herbaceous plants. If food is scarce, the Rava is renowned for mobilizing its body reserves with great ease, before replenishing them in more favorable periods. It is an excellent walker, accustomed to the sometimes steep mountain trails of the Auvergne. Its coarse fleece with long locks offers good protection against the elements. A sheep produces 1.8 kg of this wool per year, while a male produces 2.5 kg. However, this production is of little economic interest, as wool, once the primary source of textiles, has been largely supplanted by synthetic materials. Moreover, Rava's coarse, colored wool is of mediocre quality for spinning. It is used for other purposes, such as insulation.

=== Maternal qualities ===
Rava is renowned for its excellent maternal qualities. She lambs without difficulty. It takes good care of its lambs, while offering a good capacity for adopting other lambs. Her dairy aptitudes are good, given her feeding habits, and she raises her lambs easily. Weight at standard age 30 days is an indicator of the sheep' dairy potential, estimated through lamb growth over this period:

Weight of Rava sheep at standard age of 30 days in kg on breeding farms in 2010
	Simple		Double		Triple or more
	male	female	male	female	Triple or more
Average	12,5	11,8	10,2	9,6	8,4
Headcount	1,260	1,308	1,614	1,722	107
Standard deviation	2,6	2,2	2,1	2,0	1,7

==== Breeding ====
Rava is a fairly prolific breed. Performance control results show that prolificacy after natural estrus was 149.4% for sheep over 19 months of age (out of 8,323 farrowings), and 130.8% for sheep under 19 months of age (out of 1,028 farrowings). These sheep are also very sexually precocious, since they have their first estrus at around 4 months of age, and can give birth as early as 12 months. They also shed very easily and naturally. As a result, lambing is relatively spread out over the year, with a significant number of lambings in August and September, leading to fighting in spring and early summer, which is not the usual breeding season for sheep.

Monthly distribution of lambings (2009)
Month	Quantity
July	300
August	1,400
September	1,750
October	900
November	750
December	1,800
January	2,600
February	600
March	1,250
April	1,250
May	1,000
June	500

==== Lamb growth ====
The Rava breed is selected primarily for its maternal qualities. As a result, the results of growth testing of lambs between 30 and 70 days of age concern too few animals to be significant.

== Breeding ==
The classic breeding system for a flock of Rava sheep is based on breeding in the spring, or even two breeding periods (autumn and spring), with a breeding rhythm that, depending on the farm, can be accelerated (three lambings in two years). In both 2009 and 2010, 21% of sheep registered with the breeding organization lambed twice during the year. Thanks to its ease of deseasoning, reproduction is virtually unaffected by estrus induction using hormone treatments, whatever the season. From May to October, the sheep are sent to summer pastures at altitudes ranging from 1,200 to 1,500 m.

Rava lambs are supplied to the South-East of France, and are mostly slaughtered in Lyon or Vaucluse. They are light lambs of medium conformation, slaughtered at between 30 and 38 kg at an age of between 110 and 120 days. They are fairly well-priced, thanks to their fine bone structure and therefore good meat yield, and moderate fat content. They can be marketed under the "Agneau de l'Adret" or "Terre d'Agneaux" labels.

To improve the conformation of these lambs, the sheep can be crossed with rams of butcher breeds. In this way, three types of breeding can be observed in the field, similar to what exists elsewhere in mountain and piedmont sheep systems with hardy breeds:

- breeders, who run their flocks as purebreds;
- multipliers, who produce F1 sheep from Rava sheep crossed with Île-de-France rams;
- producers of terminal lambs, who cross the F1 sheep thus obtained with other rams with strong butchering aptitudes to obtain lambs for slaughter.

In its cradle, the Rava is linked to the Auvergne Volcanoes Regional Nature Park. It helps to maintain mountain pastures, which are too often abandoned and tend to become overgrown. Its hardiness makes it a perfect breed for keeping the landscape open in this region with its harsh climate.

== Distribution ==
Originating in the foothills of the Chaîne des Puys in the Puy-de-Dôme, the breed's distribution has changed very little since then, and it's still in this part of the Massif Central that it's most present. Thus, 85% of the 33,000 sheep recorded in 2000 were located in Auvergne, with the vast majority in Puy-de-Dôme and a few breeders in Allier. There is a particularly high concentration of this breed in a triangle between Olloix, Rochefort-Montagne and Chapdes-Beaufort, close to the breed's birthplace. Over time, however, the breed has been exported somewhat, and has been adopted by breeders in the Livradois and Forez mountains, and even further east in the Lyonnais mountains and as far as Bresse. In the west, it is well established in Corrèze. It also has a small presence in northern Hérault.

== Rava breed in culture ==
The Rava is a breed emblematic of its region of origin, and is often evoked with its characteristic black and white head in turn-of-the-century descriptions of Auvergne. A herd of Rava is mentioned, for example, in Auvergne writer Jean Anglade's book Pays oublié. For some, the Rava is a fitting symbol of the Auvergne mountains, as it is, in the words of a farmer who confided in Daniel Brugès: "like the people of these mountains: thrifty, resilient, stubborn and backing down from nothing, even in the face of misery".

== Bibliography ==
- Babo, Daniel (2000). Races ovines et caprines françaises. Les Races (in French). France Agricole Editions. ISBN 978-2-85557-054-9.
- Fournier, Alain (2006). L'élevage des moutons (in French). Editions Artemis. ISBN 978-2-85557-054-9.
