= Hanscotte centre-rail system =

Railroad braking system

The Hanscotte system was a design for railway locomotives and track using, in addition to the conventional load-bearing driving wheels, pairs of horizontal driving wheels mounted underneath the locomotive and pressing inwards upon a central rail, to improve adhesion and traction. The engineer Jules Hanscotte developed the system while working for Société de construction des Batignolles (SCB), Paris, in about 1904.

SCB intended to use the system for braking very heavy trains, but the most notable deployment was on the Chemin de Fer du Puy-de-Dôme, a tourist light railway between Clermont Ferrand and the summit of the Puy-de-Dôme, in 1906.

== Development ==
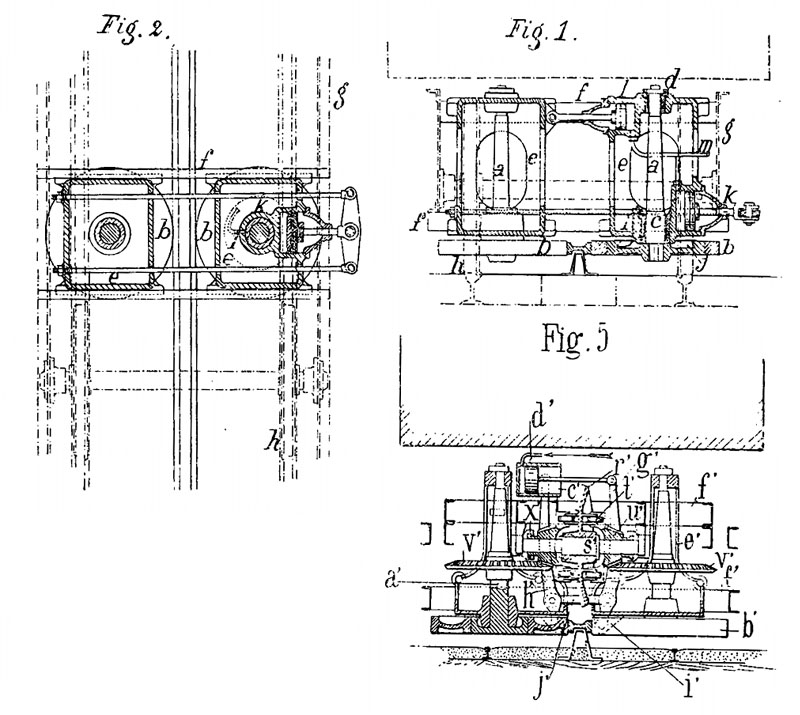
Drawing of mechanism showing pneumatic cylinder with levers controlling grip, and helical gears

In 1898 Hanscotte was working for the engineering company Société de Construction des Batignolles (SCB) (successor to Ernest Goüin et Cie., the company contracted to build Fell system centre-rail locomotives for the Mont Cenis Pass Railway in 1867). In 1904 he started work on a design for a similar system, which he perfected in 1906. The main difference from John Fell's earlier system was that Hanscotte's horizontal wheels were held in place on the centre rail by compressed air pistons operating through levers, rather than steel springs, thus allowing more flexibility and placing less strain on the locomotive through imperfections in the track. By placing the opposed pairs of horizontal wheels at the ends of the locomotive, rather than close together, Hanscotte ensured that they were less likely to drop contact at small gaps in the central rail and so fail to maintain traction—on the Chemin de Fer du Puy-de-Dôme line narrow gaps in the centre rail were permitted at level crossings. Power transmission was through a chain drive and, in their first deployment in a transport application, André Citroën's chevron gears. Three sets of brakes operated: on the vertical driving wheels; on the horizontal wheels; and directly onto the centre rail with a horizontally opposed pair of brake shoes.

SCB's main interest was reliability in braking heavy trains and keeping vehicles on the track in mountainous routes prone to high winds; the company declined to extend development for traction on steep gradients. However, Hanscotte's centre-rail brakes remained a feature of the company's designs for rail-mounted heavy artillery and support wagons.

== Chemin de Fer du Puy-de-Dôme ==
In 1904 the company Fives-Lille of Lille, northern France, took an interest in the Hanscotte system. Their first customer was the promoter Jean Claret, who bought a single electric tramcar and some other rolling stock for his short, steep line of the La Bourboule Tramway, which ran from the town centre of La Bourboule to the lower end of the La Bourboule Funicular. The enterprise was successful, and Claret used Hanscotte-equipped Fives-Lille steam locomotives for his ambitious project of a tourist light railway from the centre of Clermont Ferrand to the summit of the spectacular Puy-de-Dôme. For the first 2.5 kilometres (1.6 miles) from the city centre as far as Les Quatre Routes, Chamalières, conventional two-rail track, (electrified in 1911) was used.

The line never made money and it closed in 1925 because of competition from a new autobus route.

== Furka Oberalp Railway ==
In 1910 the Swiss Locomotive and Machine Works, Winterthur, prepared designs for Hanscotte system locomotives to operate the Furka Oberalp Railway, but the Swiss federal railway authority directed that the Abt system be used instead.

== Schneider et Compagnie ==
During the First World War ironfounders Schneider et Compagnie used Hanscotte-equipped trains to transport heavy artillery pieces on a private line from their foundry at Le Creusot, France to a firing range at nearby Les Crouillottes.

== Gallery ==
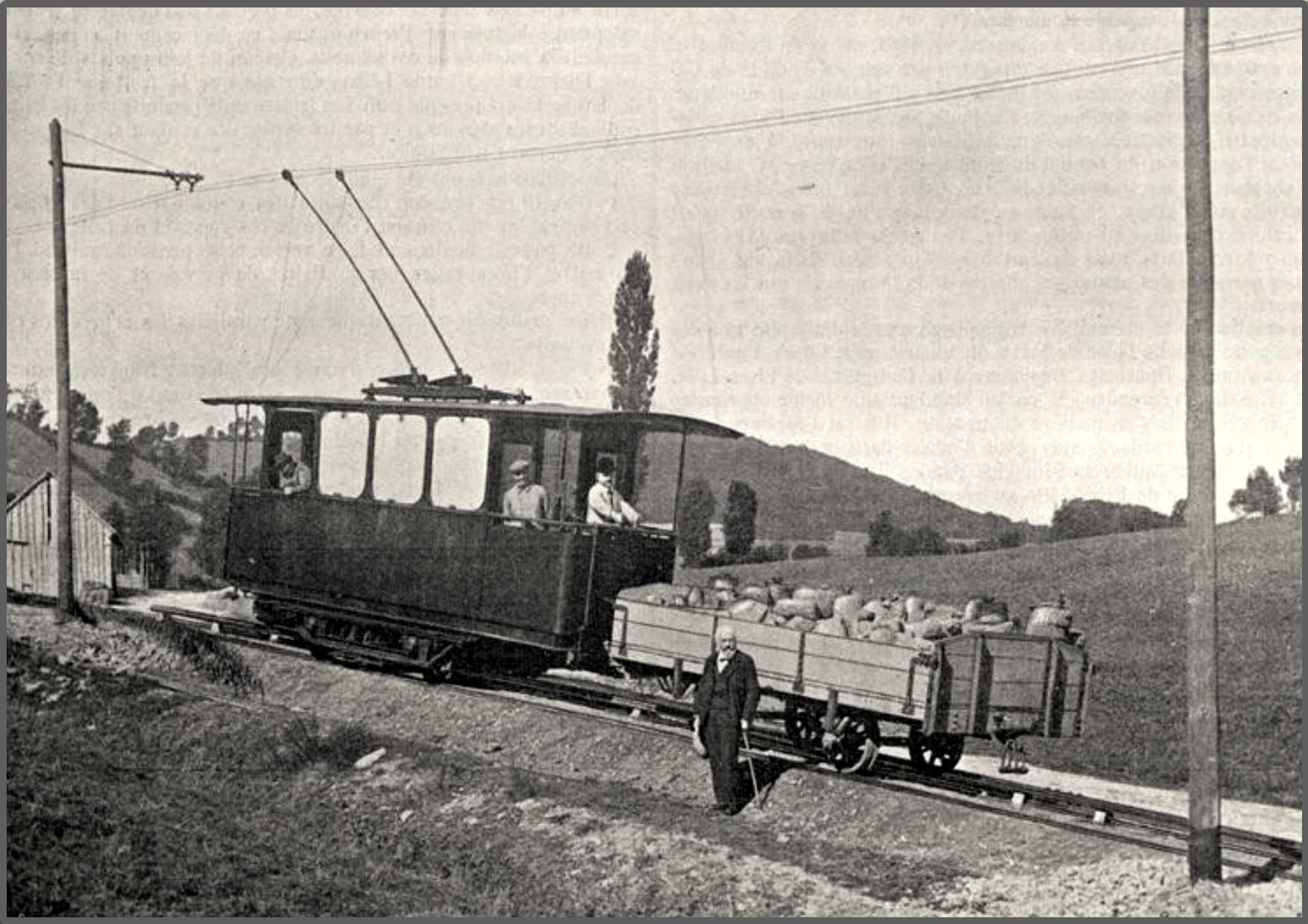
The first commercial use of Hanscotte's system was on La Bourboule tramway of 1904

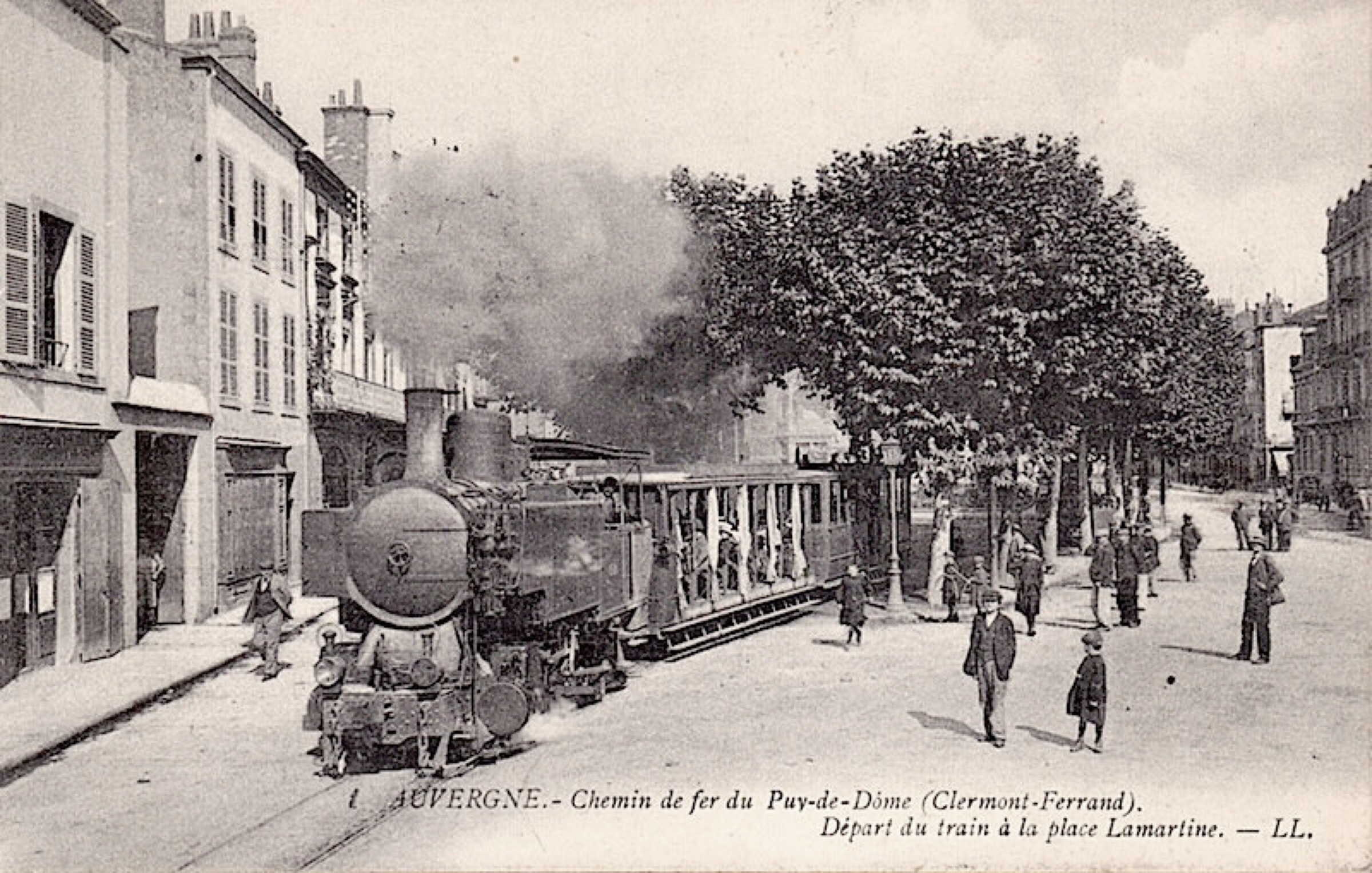
Hanscotte locomotive (built by Fives-Lille) departing from lower terminus of Puy-de-Dôme railway, about 1907

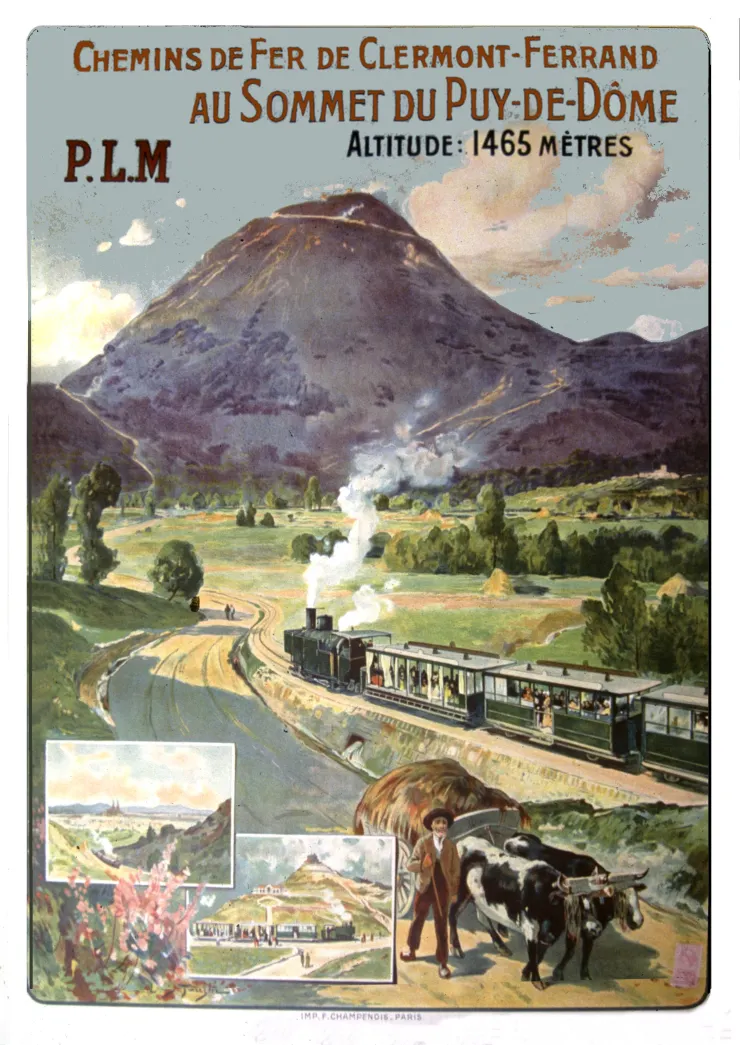
Publicity poster for the Puy-de-Dôme railway, about 1910

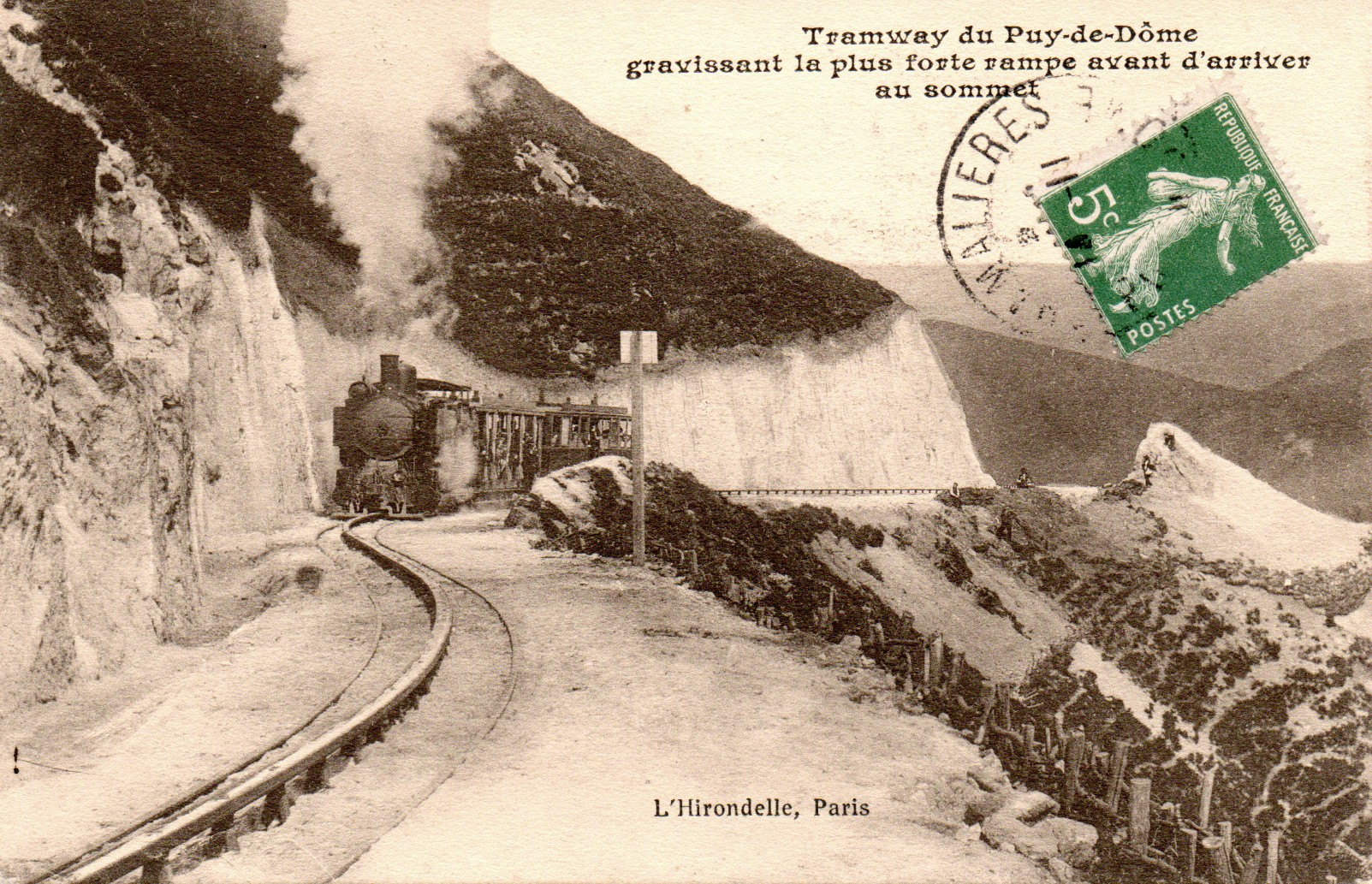
Ascent of the Puy-de-Dôme, 1910, showing the central rail. Much of the track was laid alongside the road to the summit.

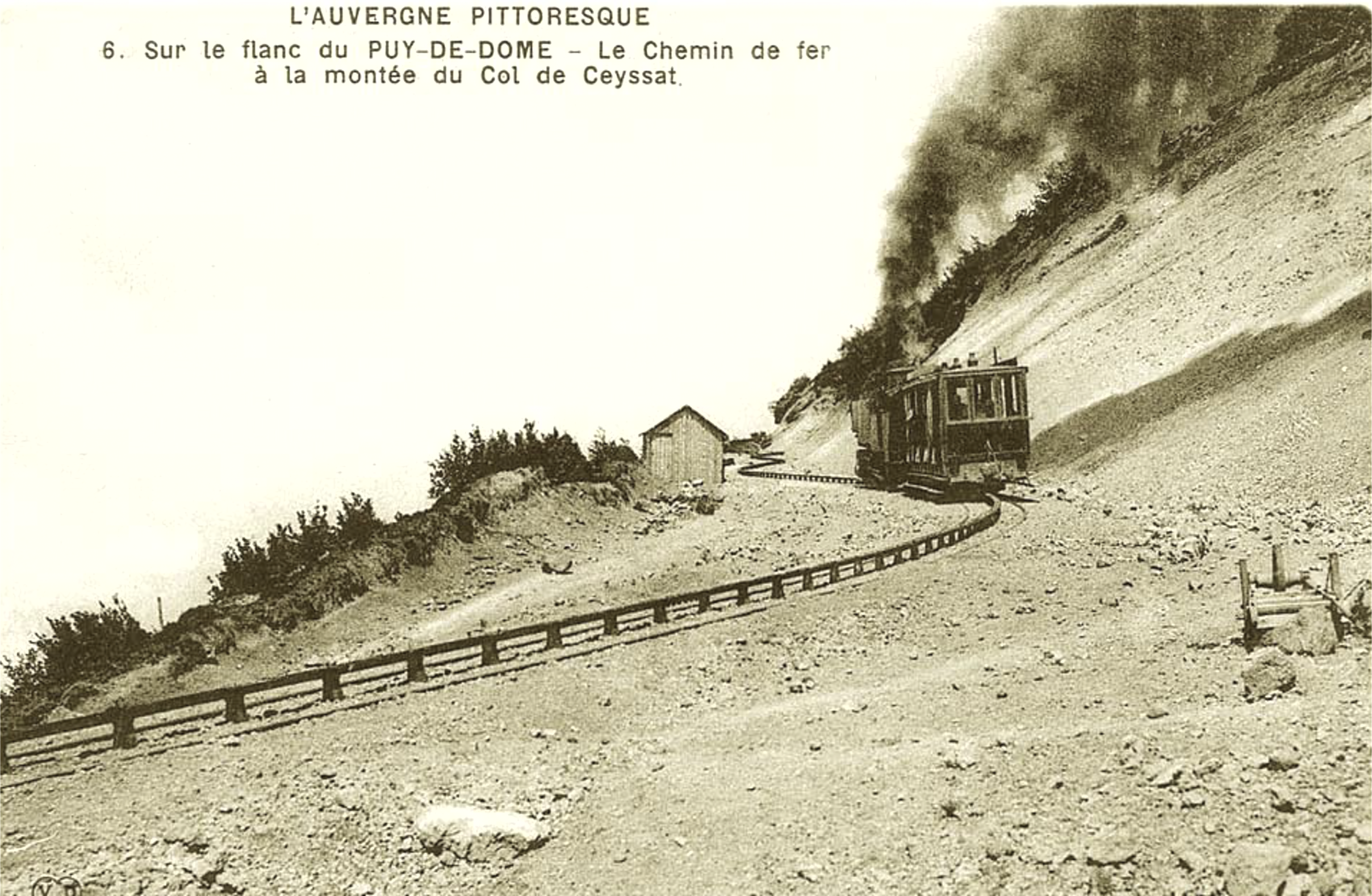
Steep section of the Puy-de-Dôme railway, 1910

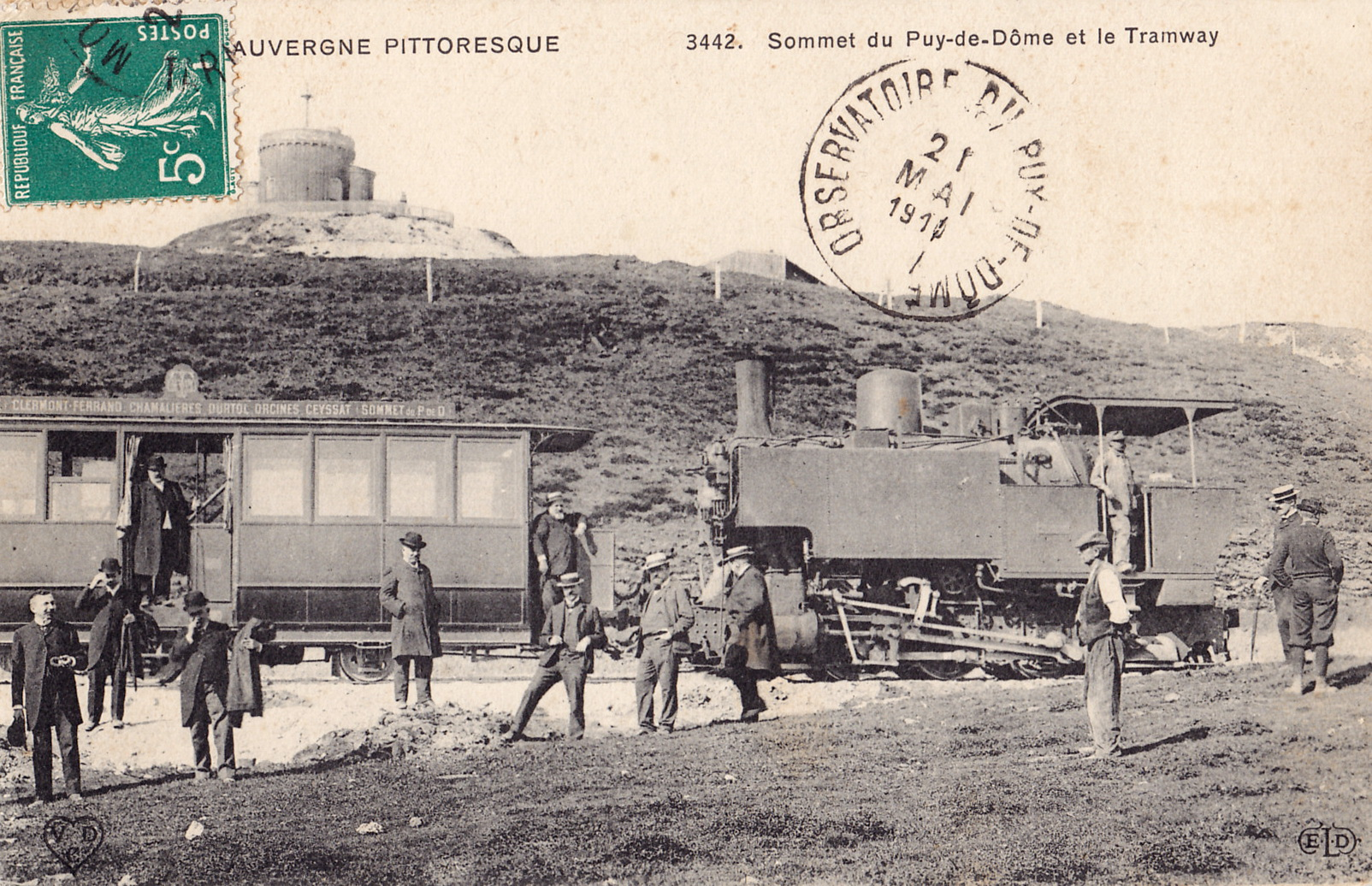
Hanscotte locomotive at summit of the Puy-de-Dôme railway, 1910

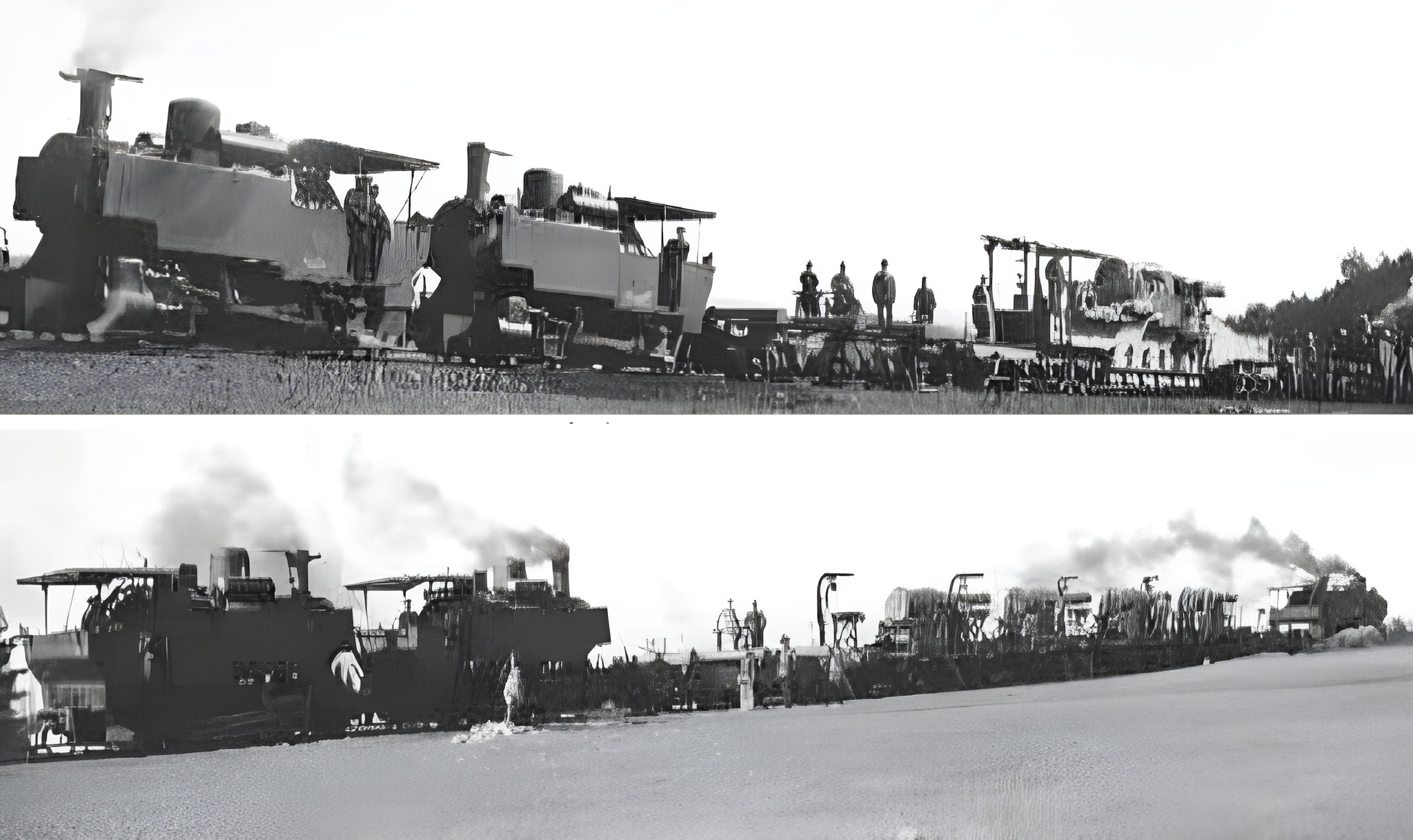
Hanscotte-equipped locomotives transport artillery pieces, Le Creusot, France, 1918
