= Basco-Béarnaise =

Basque breed of sheep

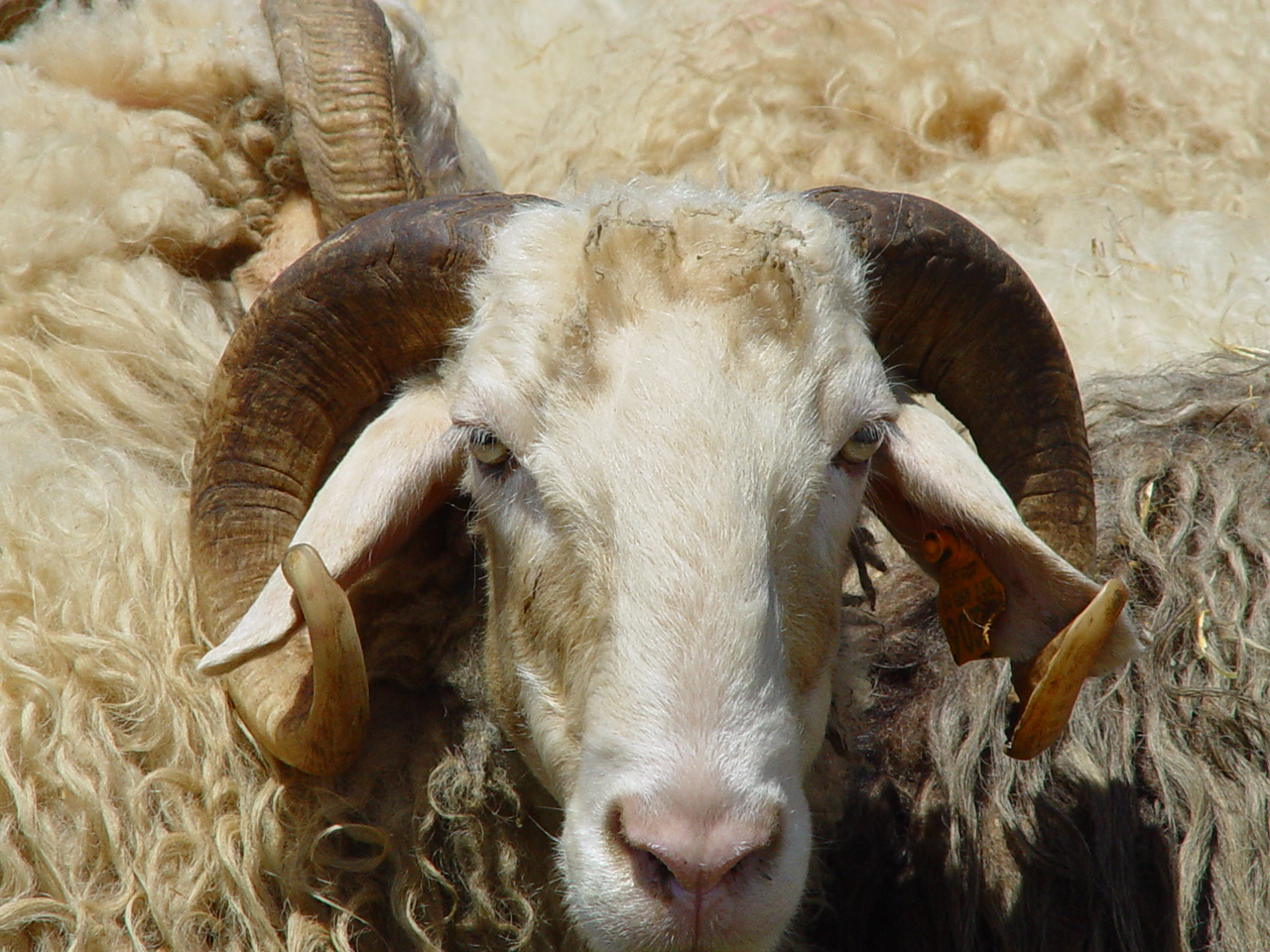
- Head
- Country of origin: Basque country
- Use: milk

The Basco-Béarnaise or Vasca Carranzana is a breed of domestic sheep originating in the Basque country. It was developed from Basque and Béarnaise sheep during the 1960s to be a single-purpose milk breed.

== Origins ==
It derives from a family of sheep breeds from the Pyrénées with falling wool. It arose in the Béarnaise part of the Pyrénées. It has long been flocked across the Girondine plain to the Pyrénéan mountain pastures.

== Morphology ==
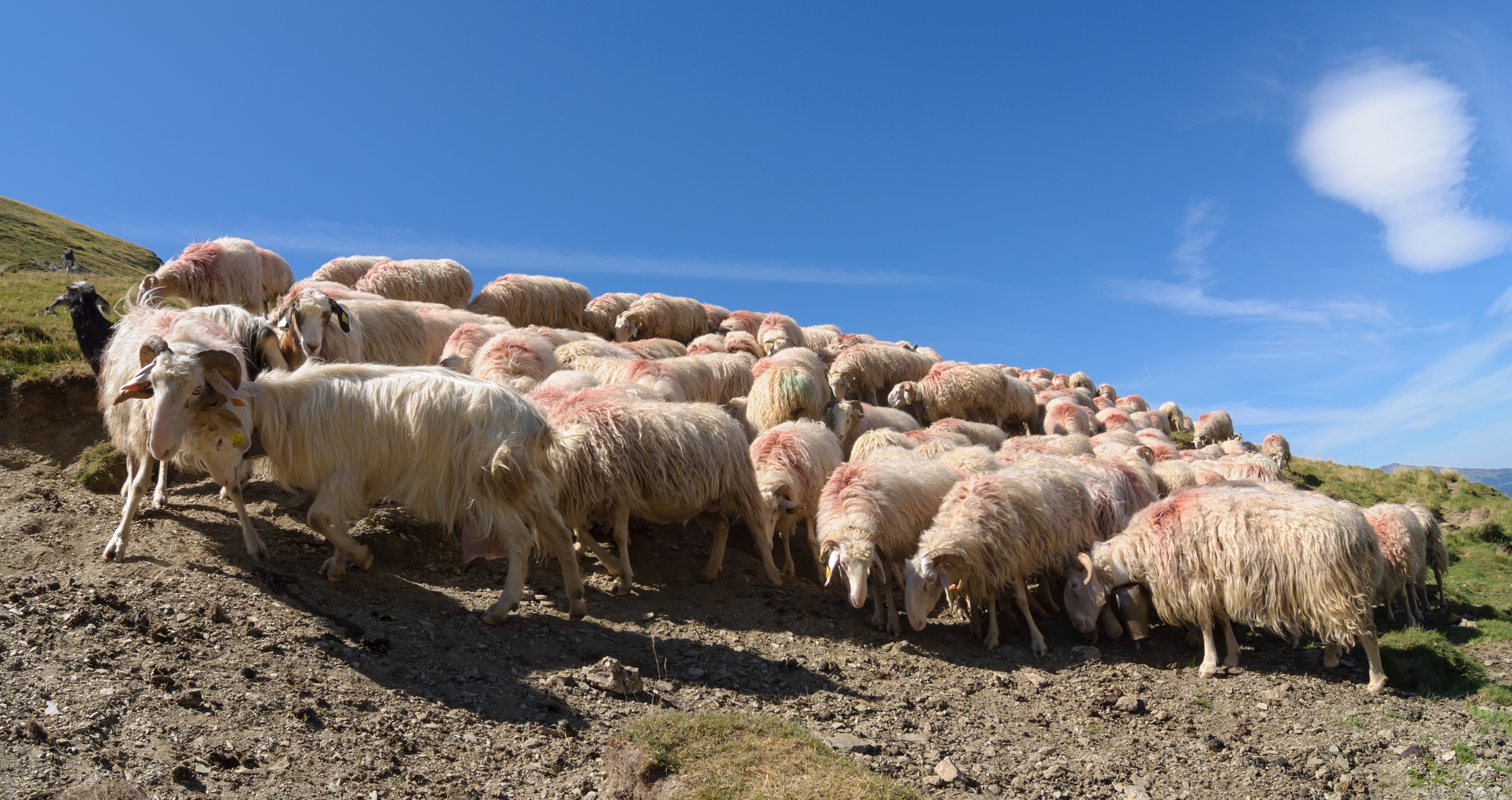
Flock near the Col d'Aubisque

Its wool is long, white and hanging. Its horns form a spiral around the ear. Its head and hooves are coloured reddish-yellow.

Rams are horned and the ewes may be either horned or polled (hornless). Both sexes display white and are unicolored.

The mature rams weigh 80 kg (180 lb) and grow to 90 cm (35 in) at the withers on average. Ewes grow to 75 cm (30 in) at the withers and weigh 55 kg (121 lb).

== Aptitude ==
It is a dairy breed, which issued from the AOC Ossau-Iraty, derived from the ewes of the Pyrénées. A ewe of this breed produces 120 litres over 130 days of lactation, producing a milk rich in matière grasse (7,42%) and in proteins (5,39%).

It is a rural breed, which lambs in spring and produces milk in the summer, passing on the richness of the Pyrénéan flora through its milk.

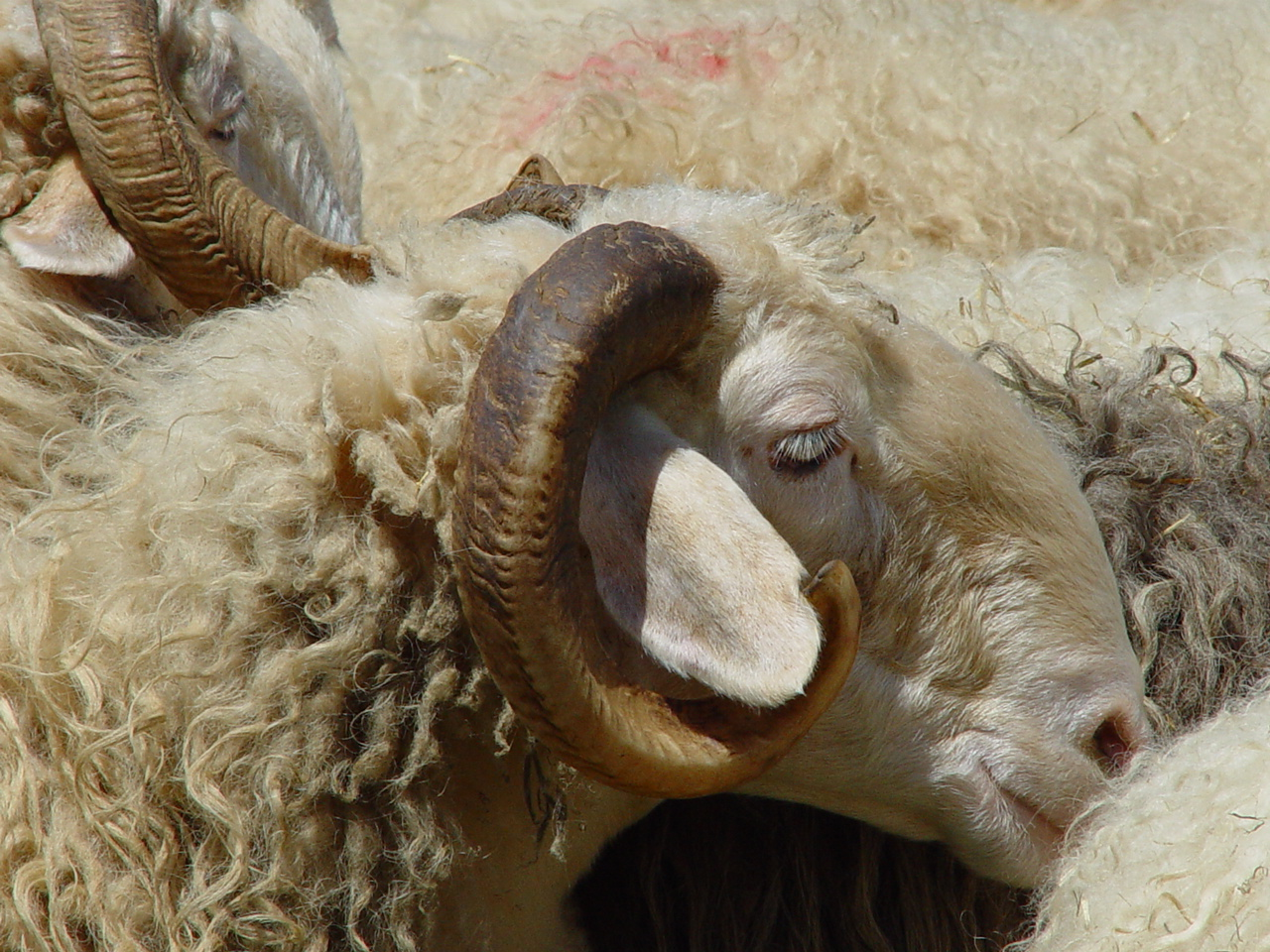
Head of an ewe

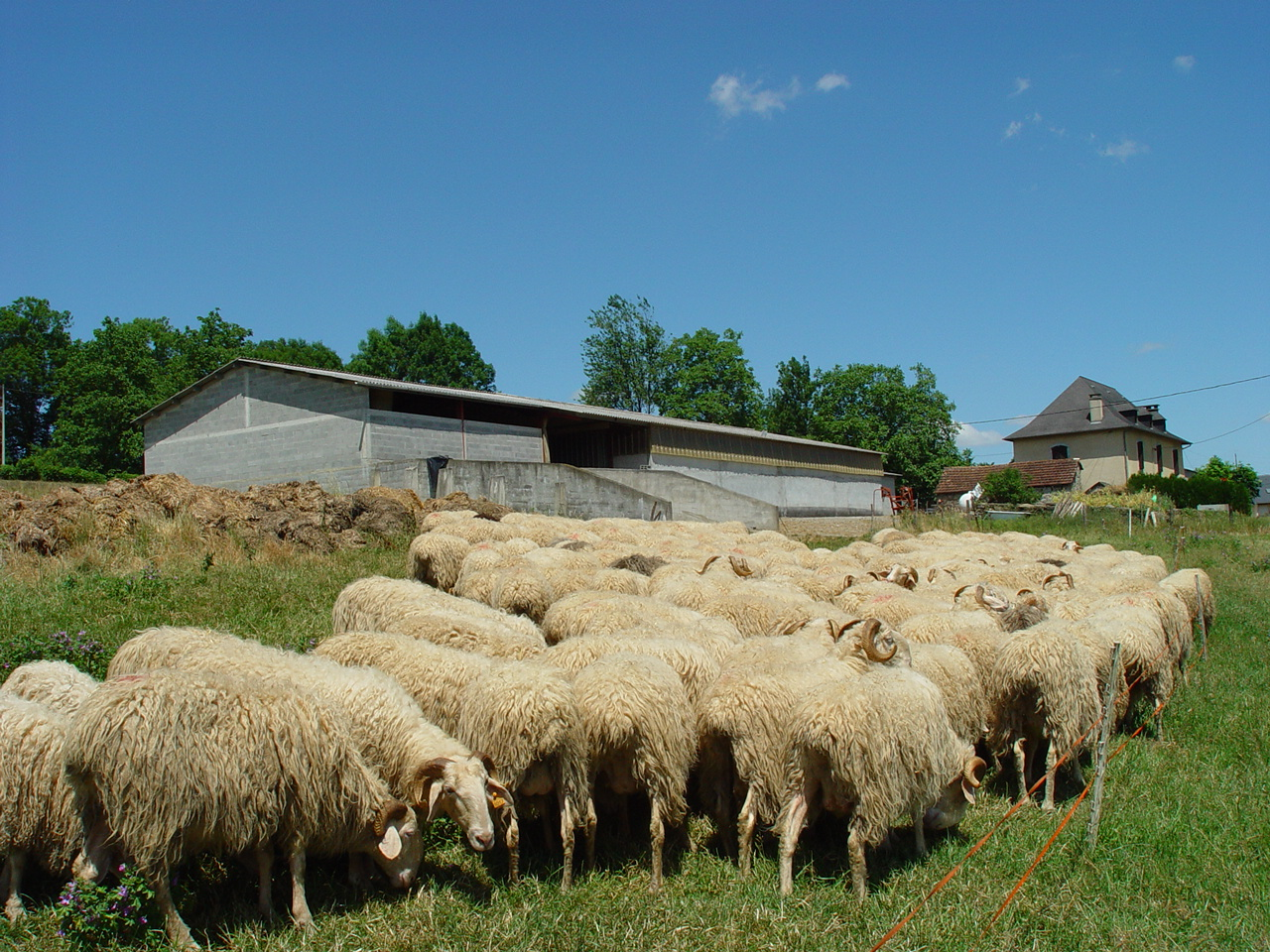
Flock of ewes near Arudy in the Pyrénées-Atlantiques department

== See also ==
- Rava sheep
