= Panoramique des Dômes =

Tourist local rail service in France

Coordinates: 45.7667°N 2.9686°E

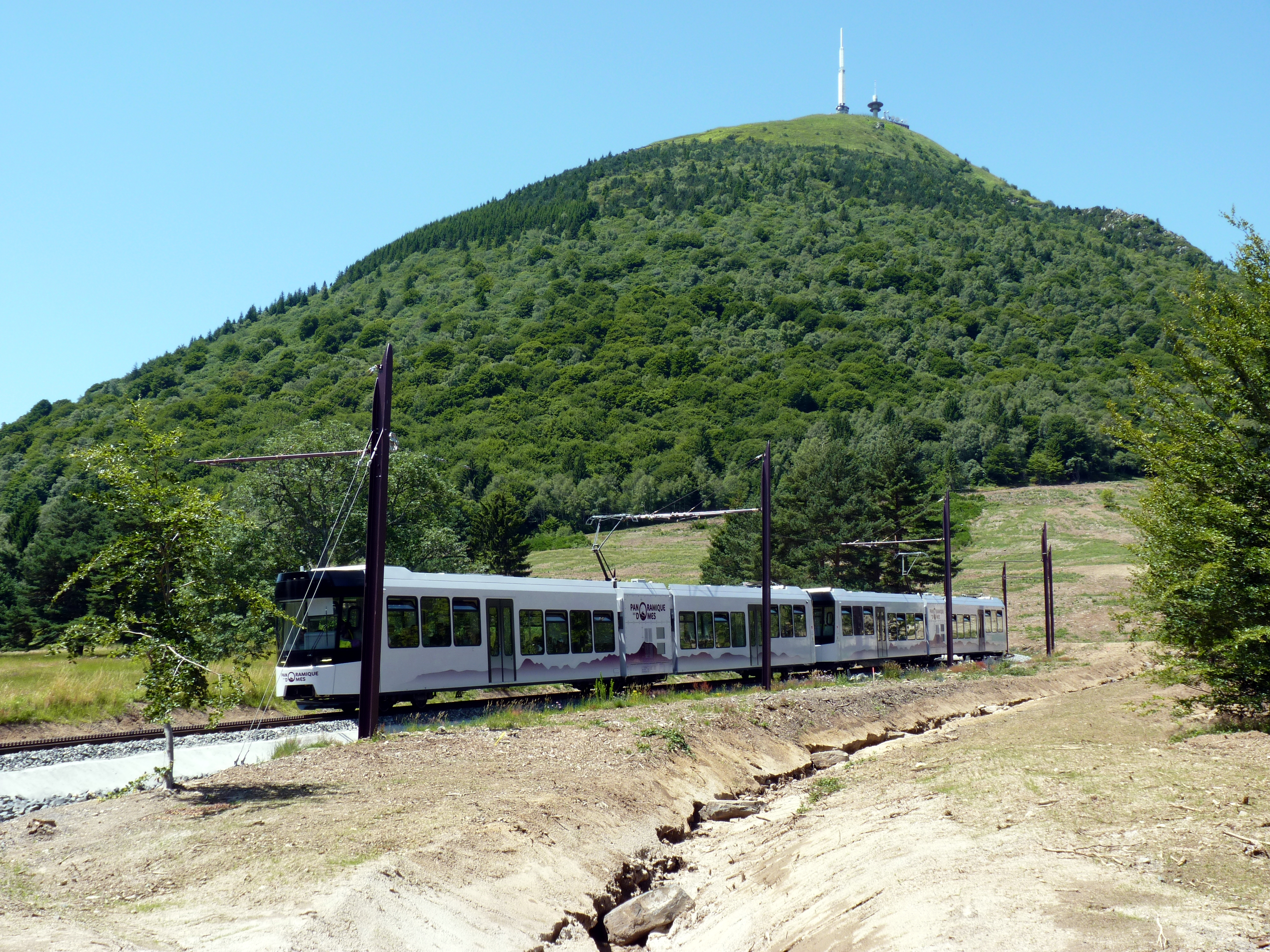
- The train at the bottom of Puy de Dôme

Overview
- Status: in operation
- Owner: Département du Puy-de-Dôme
- Locale: Puy de Dôme, France

Service
- Operator(s): SNC-Lavalin

History
- Opened: 26 May 2012

Technical
- Line length: 5.2 km (3.2 mi)
- Number of tracks: single
- Rack system: Strub
- Track gauge: 1,000 mm (3 ft 3 3/8 in) metre gauge
- Electrification: 1500 V, DC overhead line

The Panoramique des Dômes is a 5.2-kilometre (3.2 mi)-long rack railway that allows access to the top of the Puy de Dôme, in France, since mid-2012.

The railway is owned by the Conseil général du Puy-de-Dôme.

The train has a capacity of 1,200 persons an hour.

== History ==
There was a railway with a non-rack central rail on the Puy de Dôme (using the Hanscotte system) from 1907 to 1925. Construction of the railway started in 1906. It connected Lamartine in Clermont-Ferrand (elevation 390 metres [1,280 ft]) to an artificial platform near the mountain top at 1,414 metres (4,639 ft). The railway was 14.7 km (9.1 mi) long and operated between 1907 and 1926 at a loss.

The Conseil général du Puy-de-Dôme voted for construction of the new railway in 2008. Construction work was started by SNC-Lavalin in March 2010. SNC-Lavalin operated the railway under a 35-year agreement with the public service.

Traffic was stopped in October 2012 after an accident involving an empty railcar. The operator was replaced by SFTA, a subsidiary of Transdev specialising in mountain railways, and the line was reopened on 2 May 2013.

== Rolling Stock ==
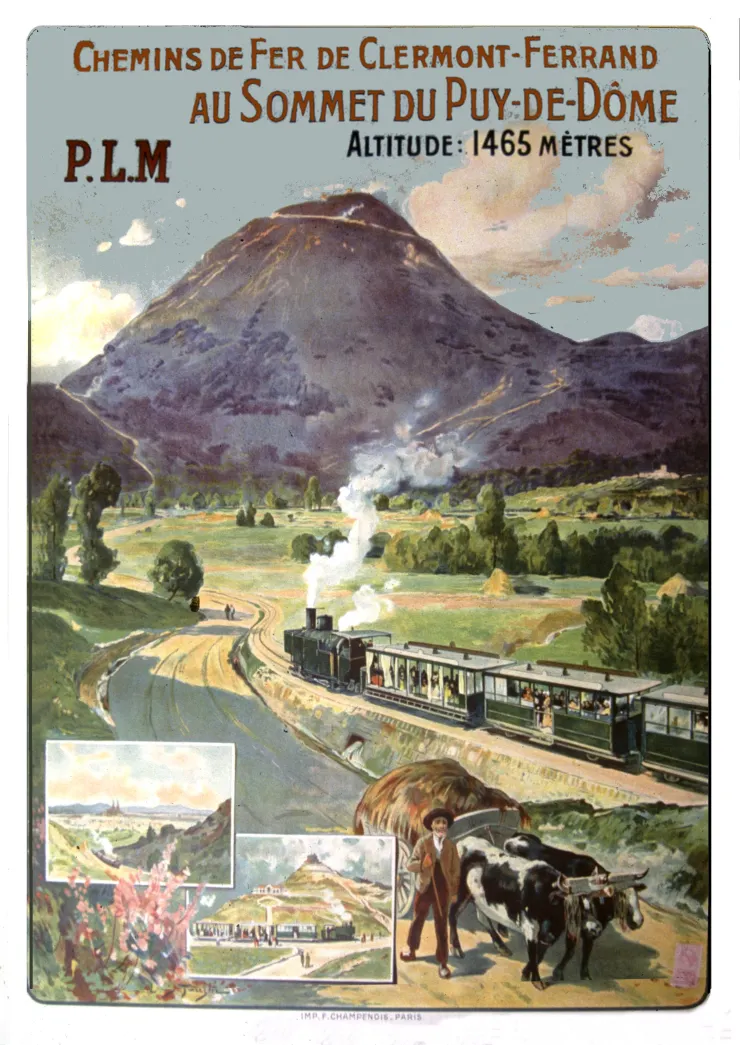
Early publicity poster from Chemins de fer Paris-Lyon-Méditerranée

The Swiss firm Stadler received an order for 4 articulated motor cars in November 2009 of the type GTW 2/6.

Weight : 45 tonnes (44 long tons; 50 short tons).
Train length : 36.5 metres (119 ft 9 in)
Capacity: 200 (112 seating and 88 standing)

In April 2023, it was announced that Stadler, along with local company ACC M, are to undertake the mid-life refurbishment of the four motor cars. One trainset will be refurbished at a time, with the first to be taken out of services after the summer of 2023 and completed before the summer of 2024.

== See also ==
- List of highest railways in Europe
