= Berrichon du Cher =

Breed of sheep

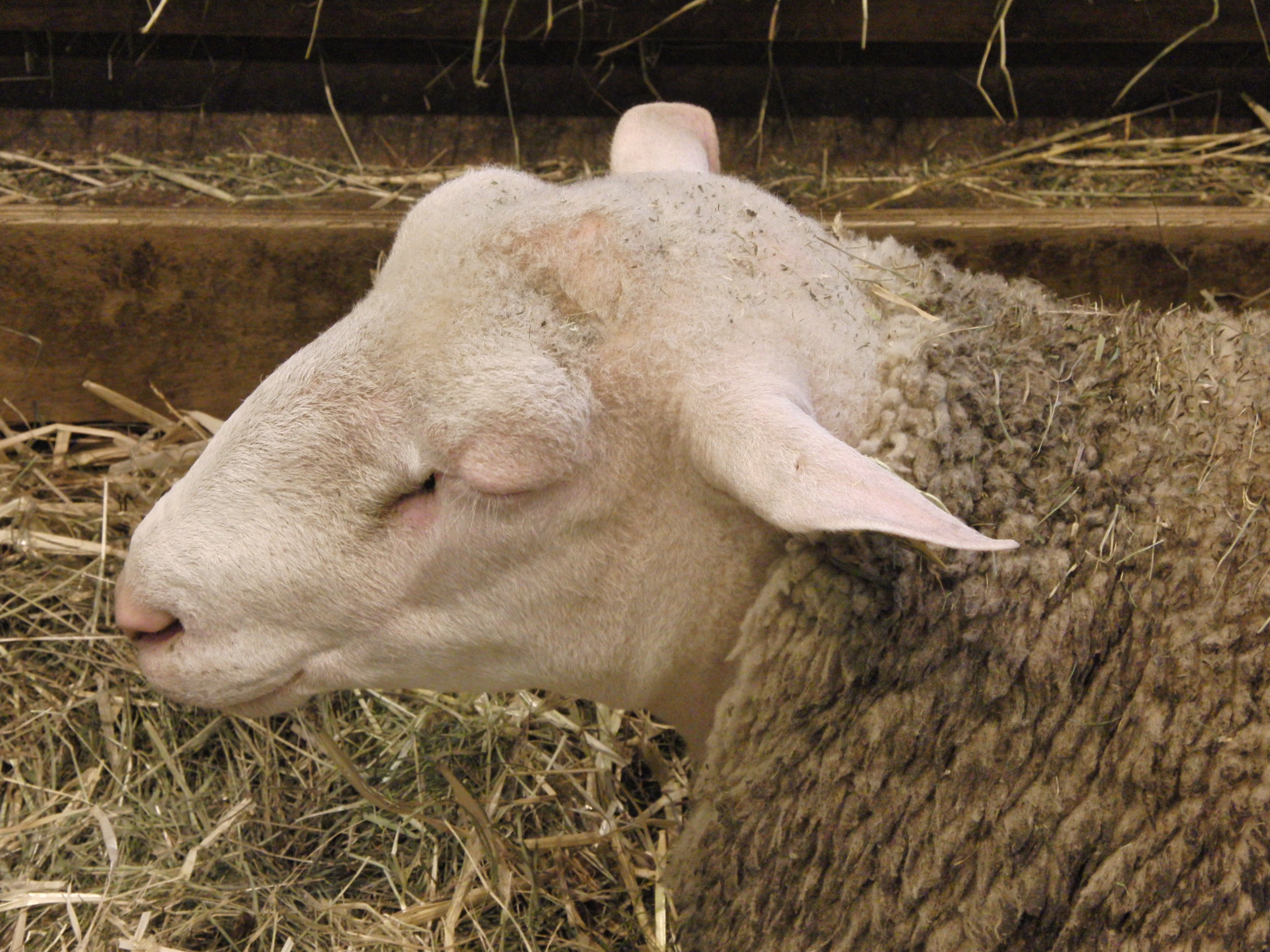
Berrichon du cher sheep

The Berrichon du Cher is a French breed of domestic sheep. It is one of two breeds derived from the old Berrichon of the Berry region of central France, the other being the Berrichon de l'Indre. The Berrichon derived from the Boischaut, Brenne, Champagne and Crevat breeds, all of which are now considered to be extinct. Images of the Berrichon from the sixteenth century show a horned long-woolled sheep; by the eighteenth century the Berrichon was polled and had wool of Merino type. In the nineteenth century some breeders crossbred the Berrichon with British breeds such as the Cotswold, Dishley Leicester, Romney and Southdown with the aim of improving its meat qualities; there was also some intromission from the Charmoise. The Berrichon du Cher derives from these crosses.

From French stock imported some 40 years ago, British breeders have developed what they regard as a distinct sub-breed which they have named British Berrichon. Breed sales are held several times a year. and many of the top agricultural shows, including the Royal Three Counties, the Royal Bath & West, the Royal Highland and England's biggest show, Great Yorkshire Show, hold separate classes for British Berrichons. The British breeders are mainly based in the West from Devon up to Scotland.

== Characteristics ==
Both sexes are polled (hornless). The sheep have medium wool and are white.

The rams weigh 110 kg (240 lb) and ewes weigh 70 kg (150 lb) on average. At the withers, rams grow to 73 cm (29 in) and ewes to 68 cm (27 in).

== See also ==
- Rava sheep
