= Vendéen =

Breed of sheep

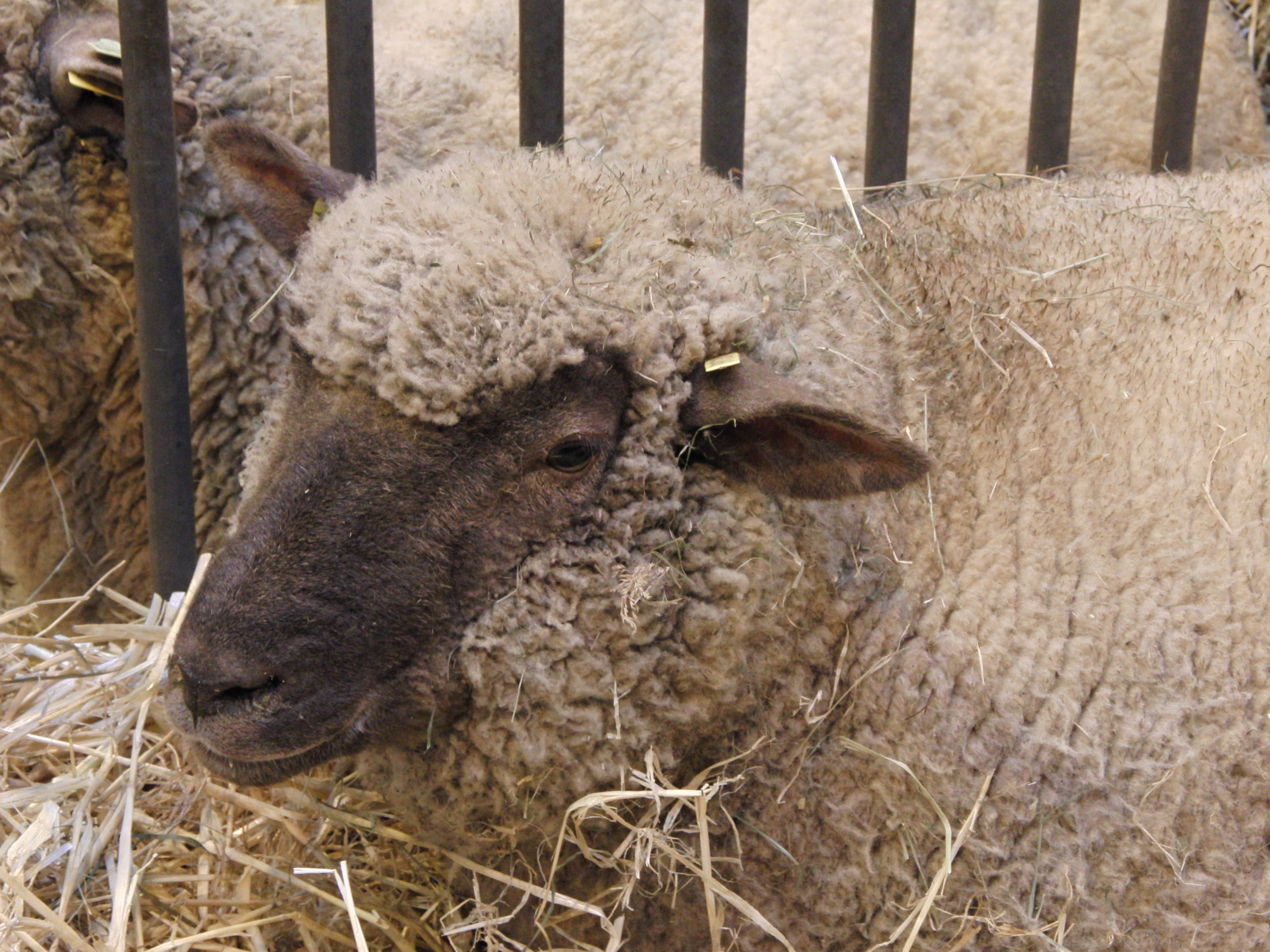

The Vendéen is a breed of domestic sheep originating near Vendée in western France. It was developed by crossing local ewes with Southdown rams in the early 19th century. It is primarily a meat breed known for its muscularity and ability to produce large litters of lambs. They have a fine, medium-length wool. Both Vendéen ewes and rams are usually polled, but occasionally rams can have small horns. Their faces and legs have dark brown or gray hair. The breed is commonly used among farmers as a terminal sire for producing lambs for meat.

== See also ==
- Rava sheep
