= Rouge de l'Ouest =

Breed of sheep

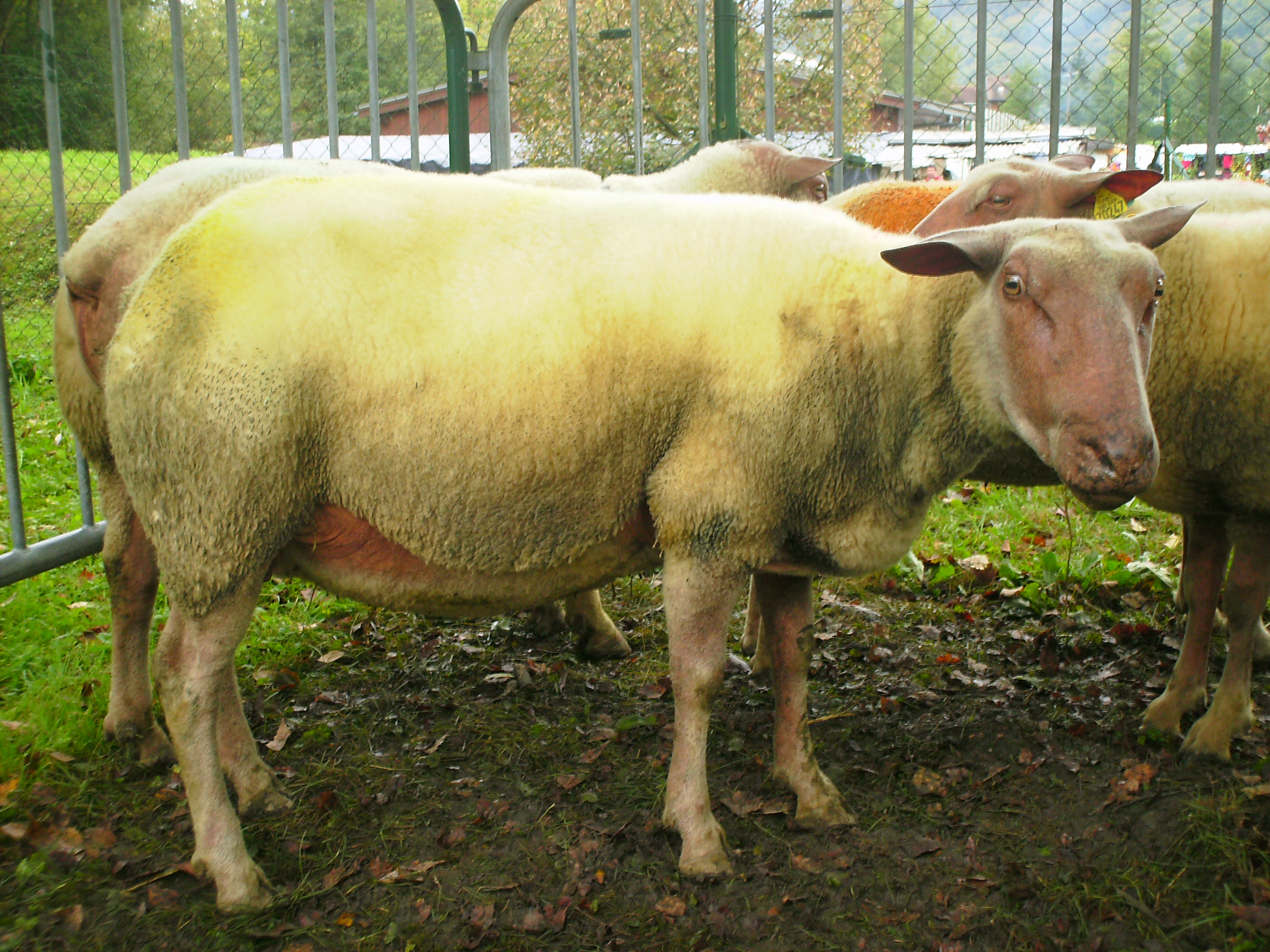
A Rouge de l'Ouest ewe

The Rouge de l'Ouest (also known as Tête rouge du Maine) is breed of domestic sheep originating in France. The breed's name, which literally translates from French as "Red of the West", refers to its region of origin and its unique pinkish face and legs. It was developed in the Maine et Loire department of France, through crossing local landrace sheep with Wensleydales and Bluefaced Leicesters. The French registry was established in 1968, and the U.K. registry was in 1986.

The Rouge was originally a dairy sheep breed used to produce Camembert cheese, but is now primarily raised for meat. Particularly, Rouge rams are used as sires for market lambs. It has medium length wool, a polled head, and a well-muscled body. Despite its quite different appearance, it is related to the Bleu du Maine. The average fleece weight for the Rouge is 1.5 kg (0.68 lbs) to 2.0 kg (0.9 lbs) with a staple length of 4 cm (1.8 inches) to 5 cm (2.3 inches) and a spinning count of 58's to 60's.
