= Charmoise =

French breed of sheep

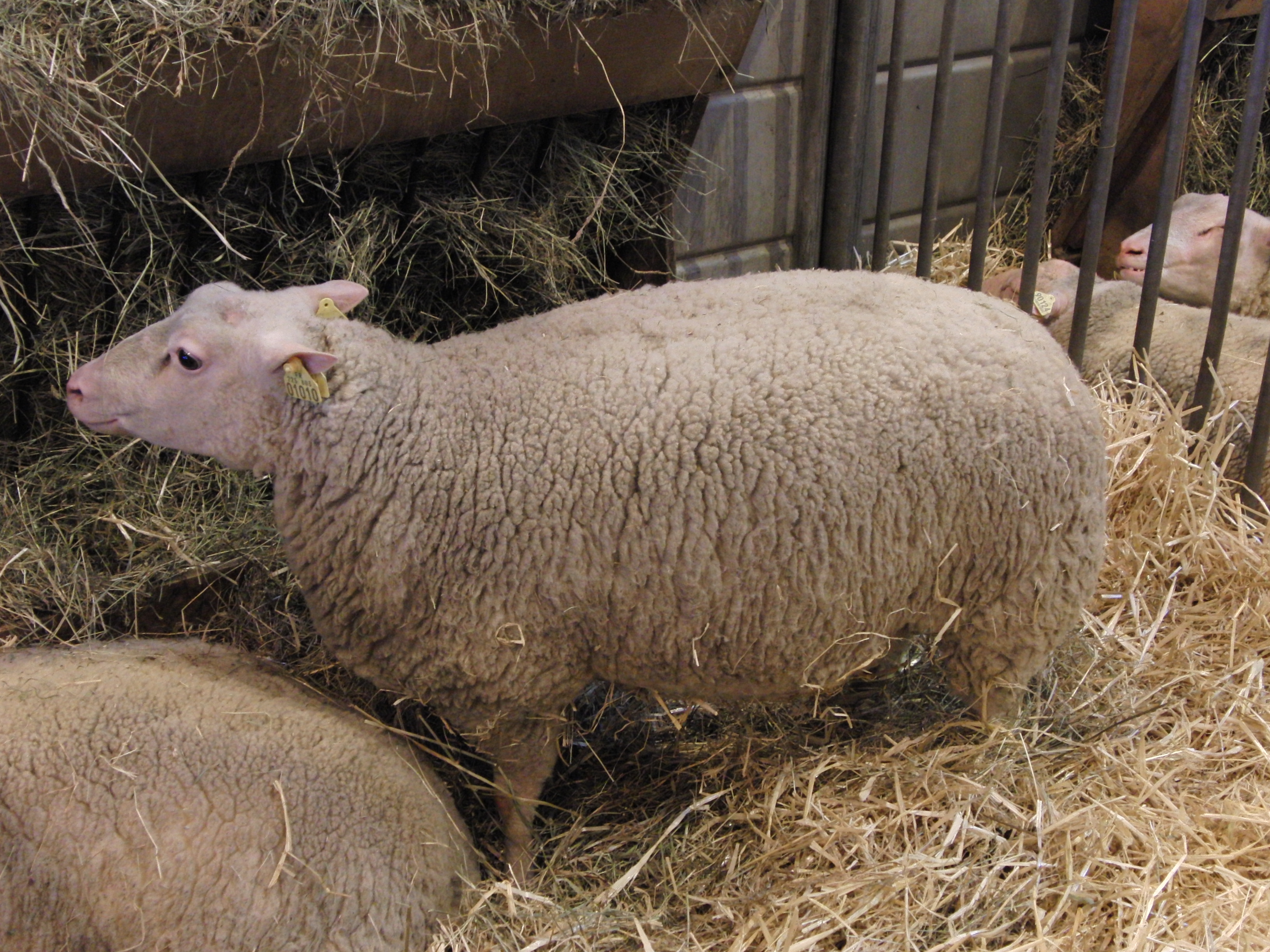
- At the Salon international de l'agriculture in Paris in 2011
- Conservation status: FAO (2007): not at risk; DAD-IS (2022): not at risk
- Country of origin: France
- Distribution: central western France; south-western France

Traits
- Weight: Male: 80–95 kg; Female: 55–65 kg

The Charmoise is a French breed of domestic sheep. It was created in the early nineteenth century by Édouard Malingié, by cross-breeding of Romney stock imported from the United Kingdom with local breeds including the Berrichon du Cher, Merino, Solognote and Tourangelle. It is reared for both meat and wool. Breed numbers fell from a peak of approximately 650000 in the 1960s to about 122000 in 1983, to approximately 21000 in 2001, and further to 8100 in 2014.

== History ==
The Charmoise was created in the early nineteenth century by Édouard Malingié at his estate La Charmoise, in the département of Loir-et-Cher between Blois and Tours in central France. Romney rams imported from Kent in the United Kingdom were cross-bred with ewes of local breeds including the Berrichon du Cher, Merino, Solognote and Tourangelle, in the hope of combining the meat qualities of the former with the rusticity of the latter.

The breed was rapidly established, by 1820 at the latest. Its first appearance at an agricultural show was in 1852. In 1896 a breed society was established; in 1926 this was re-formed, and in 1927 the first volume of the flock-book was published. There were by this time some 200000 head. Numbers increased further in the twentieth century, reaching a peak of approximately 650000 head in the 1960s. These were widely distributed in south-west central France, in an area bounded roughly by the rivers Garonne to the south-west and Loire to the north and east, and concentrated particularly in the départements of Haute-Vienne and Vienne in the centre of that area. From the 1960s numbers began to fall – to about 122000 in 1983, to approximately 21000 in 2001, and further to 8100 in 2014.

In 2022 the conservation status of the Charmoise was listed by DAD-IS as 'not at risk'.

== Characteristics ==
The Charmoise is white-faced and white-woolled; it is polled in both sexes. Rams stand some 65 cm (26 in) at the withers, and ewes about 5 cm less. Average body weights have increased by some 10–15 kg since the mid-twentieth century; in 2016 the weight ranges were given as 80–95 kg (175–210 lb) for rams and 55–65 kg (120–145 lb) for ewes.

== See also ==
- Rava sheep
