= Bleu du Maine =

French breed of sheep

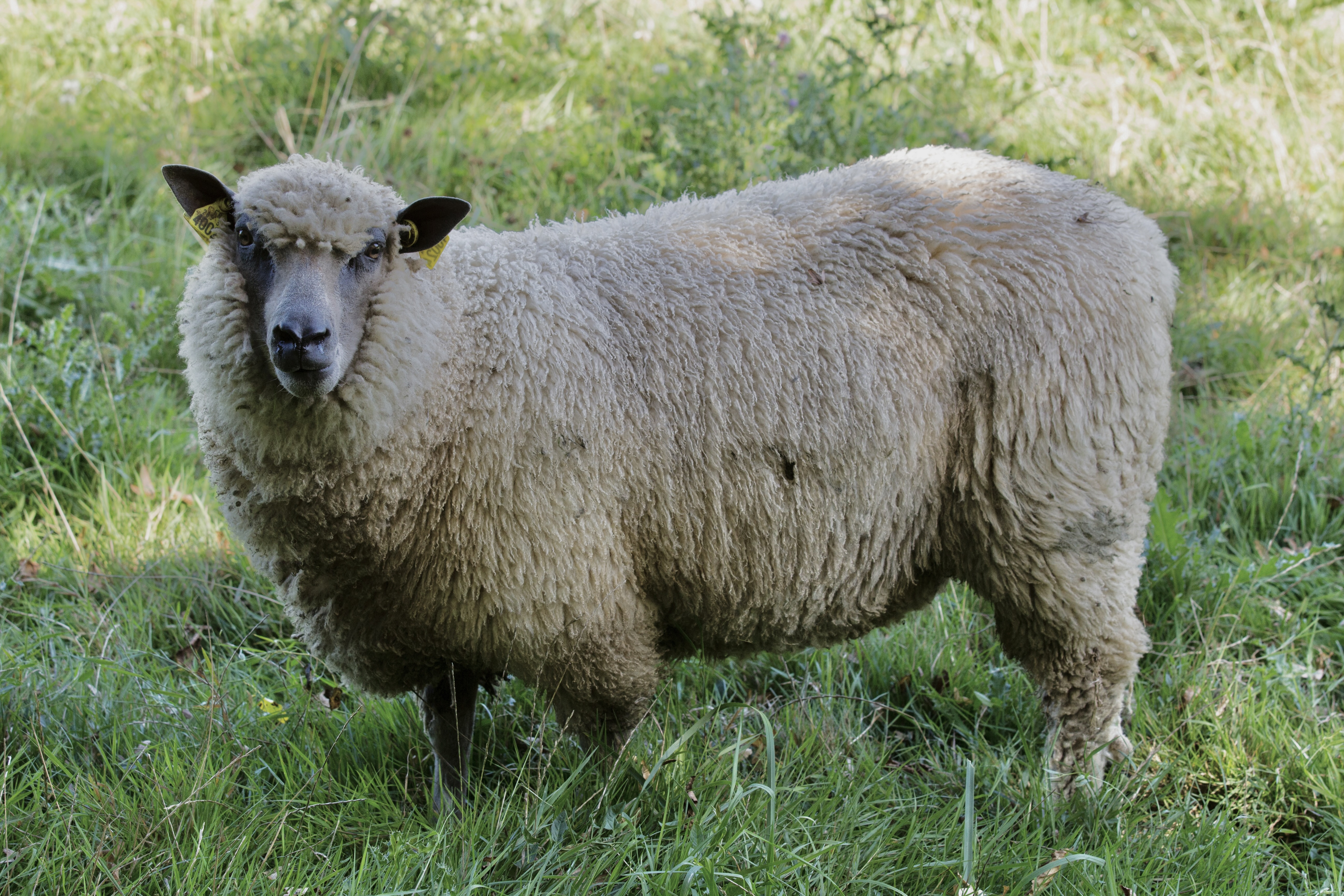
- In the Écomusée du pays de Rennes
- Conservation status: FAO (2007): not at risk; DAD-IS (2021): endangered
- Other names: Bazougers; Blauköpfiges Fleischschaf; Bluefaced Maine; Blue-headed Maine; Maine-Anjou; Maine à tête bleue; Mayenne Blue
- Country of origin: France
- Standard: Organisme de Sélection
- Use: meat, wool

Traits
- Weight: Male: 110–120 kg; Female: 80–90 kg
- Height: Male: 76 cm; Female: 65 cm
- Wool colour: white
- Face colour: blue
- Horn status: polled

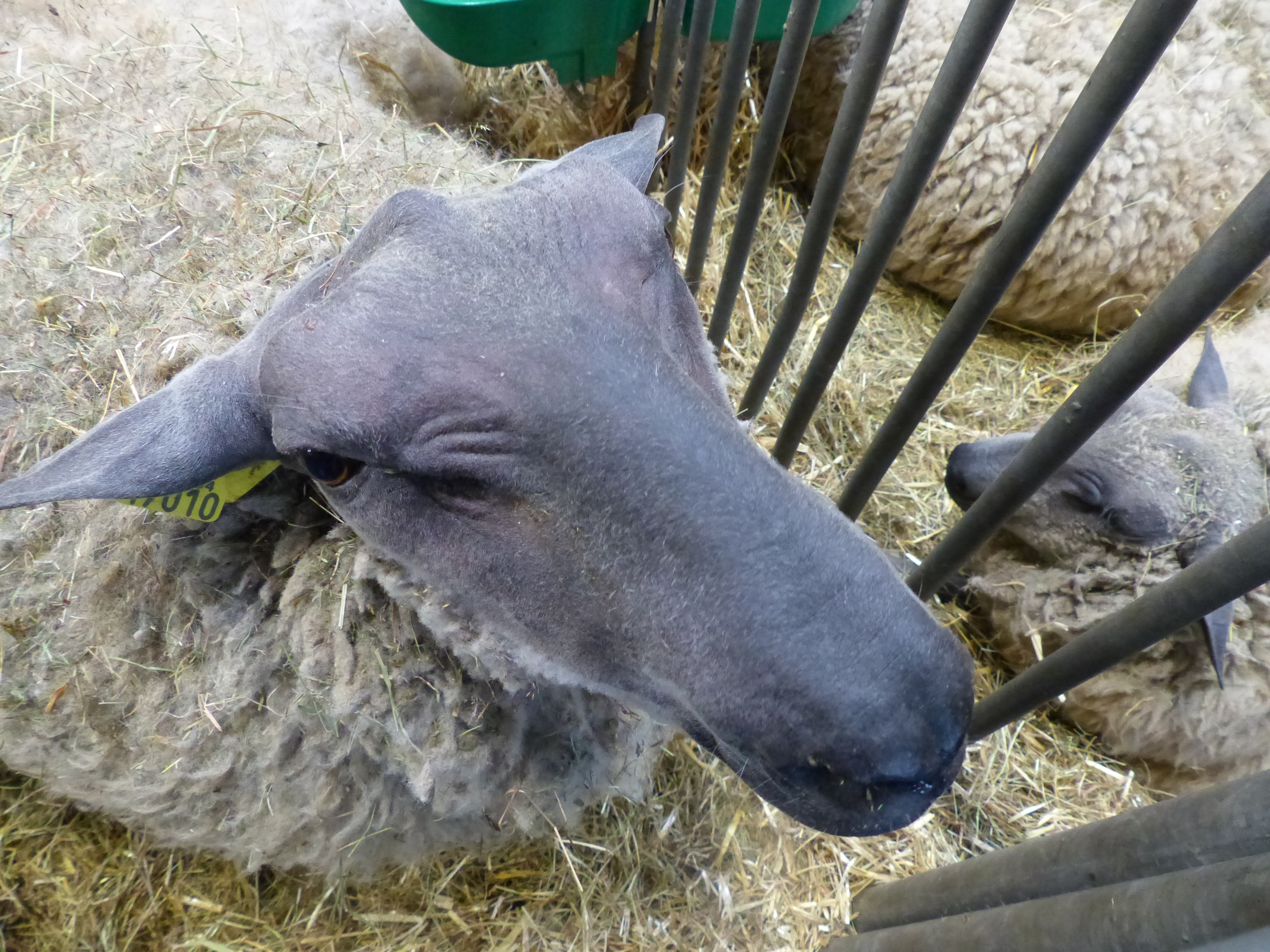
Detail of head (Salon International de l'Agriculture, Paris, 2018

The Bleu du Maine is a French breed of domestic sheep. It originated in the historic region of Maine, and is distributed mainly in the départements of Maine-et-Loire, the Mayenne and the Sarthe in the Pays de la Loire in western France.

It is a large and prolific sheep, characterised by the distinctive blue face from which its name derives. It is raised primarily for meat.

== History ==
The Bleu du Maine shares some ancestry with the Rouge de l'Ouest. It derives from cross-breeding in the early nineteenth century of the now-extinct Choletais – named for the town of Cholet in southern Maine-et-Loire – with imported British Leicester Longwool or Dishley Leicester stock. Towards the end of the century there was some influence from the Wensleydale, from which the characteristic blue face derives. As the name suggests, the breed originated in the historic region of Maine, principally in the areas surrounding the towns of Bazougers in the département of Mayenne and Sablé-sur-Sarthe and Souvigné-sur-Sarthe in the Sarthe. It is reared mainly in the Mayenne, the Sarthe, and in Maine-et-Loire; its range extends into the Orne in southern Normandy.

A flock-book was started in 1927; the breed received the official recognition of the Ministère de l'Agriculture in 1948. In 2015 the total population was estimated at just under 11 000, of which 1703 were recorded in the flock-book. In 2007 the conservation status of the breed world-wide was listed by the FAO as "not at risk"; in 2021 the status for France only was reported to DAD-IS as "endangered".

Some have been exported to European countries, and to Ethiopia; in 2021 the breed was reported from Belgium, France, Holland, Ireland and the United Kingdom. Some were exported to the United Kingdom in 1980 for use as mule sires; the resulting ewes were found to be considerably less productive than daughters of British breeds such as the Blue-faced Leicester, the Border Leicester and the British Milksheep.

== Characteristics ==
The Bleu du Maine is a large heavy sheep: rams weigh some 110–120 kg, ewes about 80–90 kg. It is characterised by a distinctive blue face, varying in colour from almost black to a reddish tinge. The fleece is white. The face is broad, with a slightly convex profile; it and the legs are free of wool.

== Use ==
The Bleu du Maine is reared primarily for meat. Prolificity is reported to be 1.88.

Fleeces weigh some 4–6 kg, with a staple length of approximately 80–100 mm and fineness of Bradford count 50s–56s, equivalent to approximately 27–30 μm.
