= Chaîne des Puys =

Volcano in France

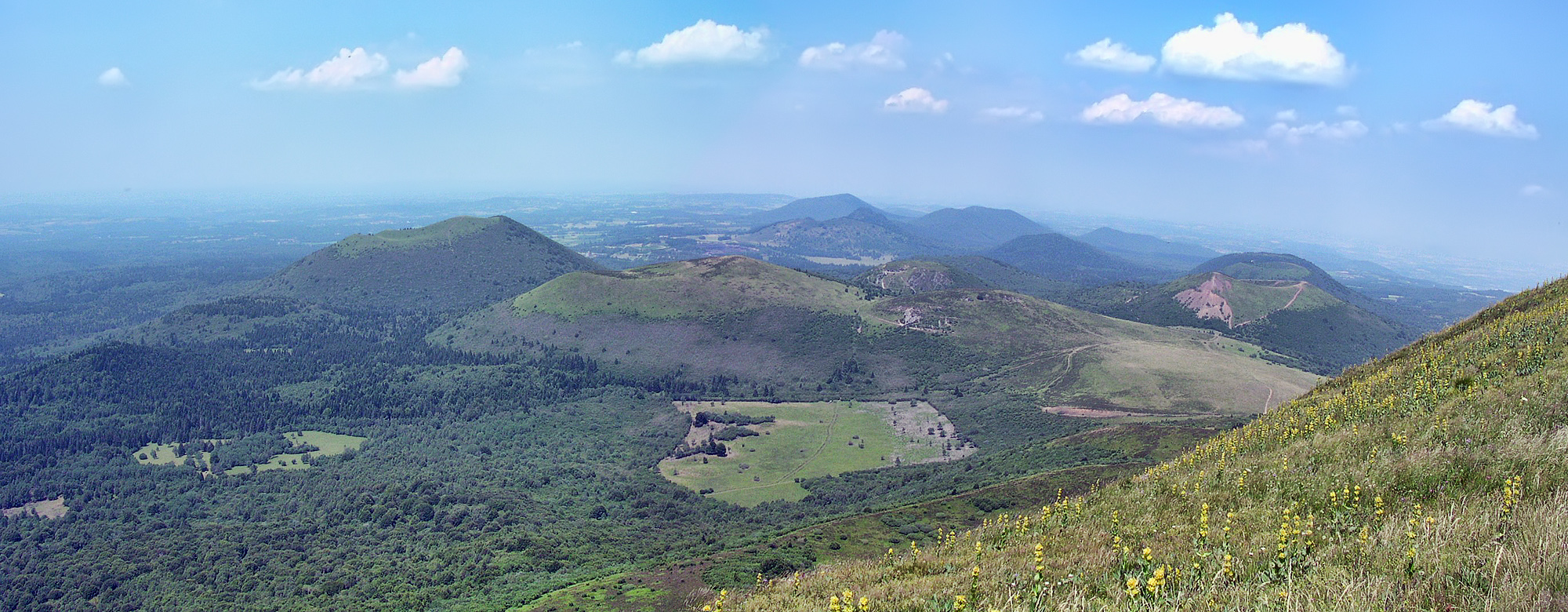
- View of the Chaîne des Puys from Puy de Dôme

Highest point
- Elevation: max. 1,464 m (4,803 ft) at Puy de Dôme
- Coordinates: 45.5°N 2.8°E

Geography
- Location within France
- Location: Auvergne-Rhône-Alpes, France
- Parent range: Massif Central

Geology
- Rock age: From 7,000 to 95,000 years
- Mountain type(s): cinder cones, lava domes, and maars
- Last eruption: 4040 BC ± 150 years

UNESCO World Heritage Site
- Official name: Chaîne des Puys - Limagne fault tectonic arena
- Type: Natural
- Criteria: (viii)
- Designated: 2018
- Reference no.: 1434
- Region: Western Europe

The Chaîne des Puys (French: [ʃɛːn de pɥi]; lit. 'Chain of the Puys') is a north-south oriented volcanic field, about 40 kilometres (25 mi) long, comprising 48 cinder cones, eight lava domes, and 15 maars and explosion craters, in the Massif Central of France. Its highest point is the lava dome of Puy de Dôme, located near the middle of the chain, which is 1,465 metres (4,806 ft) high. The name of the range comes from a regional French term, puy, which refers to a volcanic mountain with a rounded profile. A date of 4040 BC is usually given for the last eruption of a Chaîne des Puys volcano.

An outstanding example of plate tectonics in action and continental rifting, the Chaîne des Puys region became a UNESCO World Heritage Site in 2018.

== Formation ==
The Chaîne des Puys is located on the Limagne fault, a major part of the European Cenozoic Rift System which formed during the creation of the Alps roughly 35 million years ago. The region has a wide variety of geologic features formed by the rifting. The mountain chain itself began to form approximately 95,000 years ago, and the volcanic activity that formed the range stopped about 10,000 years ago. The majority of the cones were formed by Strombolian eruptions, and these cones usually have well-defined summit craters. Some have nested craters, and others show broken rims where lava poured through.

In contrast, Puy de Dôme was created by a Peléan eruption; this type of eruption is characterized by long dormant periods periodically interrupted by sudden, extremely violent eruptions.

Future eruptions at the Chaîne des Puys are possible and would result in the formation of new mountains.

== Research ==
Before 1750 and the chain's identification as volcanic, the Puys were rumored to be man-made mounds of mining waste or Roman forge furnaces.

The chain was the subject of the pioneering research of English geologist George Julius Poulett Scrope, starting in the 1820s. In 1827 he published his Memoir on the Geology of Central France, including the Volcanic formations of Auvergne, the Velay and the Vivarais, which was later re-published in a revised and somewhat more popular form in The Geology and extinct Volcanos of Central France in 1858. These books were the first widely published descriptions of the Chaîne des Puys, and the analysis therein laid the foundation for many of the basic principles of volcanology.

== Bibliography ==
- Scrope, George Poulett (1858). The Geology and extinct Volcanos of Central France. J. Murray, London. pp. 258. ISBN 0-405-10459-6. (reprinted in 1978 by Arno Press)
- Scarth, Alwyn; Tanguy, Jean-Claude (2001). Volcanoes of Europe. Oxford University Press. pp. 243 pp. ISBN 0-19-521754-3.
- Cattermole, Peter (2001). Auvergne (Classic Geology in Europe 2). Terra Publishing. pp. 176 pp. ISBN 1-903544-05-X.
- "Chaîne des Puys". Global Volcanism Program. Smithsonian Institution.
- Boivin Pierre; et al. (2004). Volcanologie de la Chaîne des Puys, Massif Central Français. Clermont-Ferrand: Parc Naturel Régional des Volcans d'Auvergne. OCLC 634970268.
