= Bizet sheep =

French breed of sheep

Bizet
- Ram and ewe on the Île Longue in the Kerguelen Islands

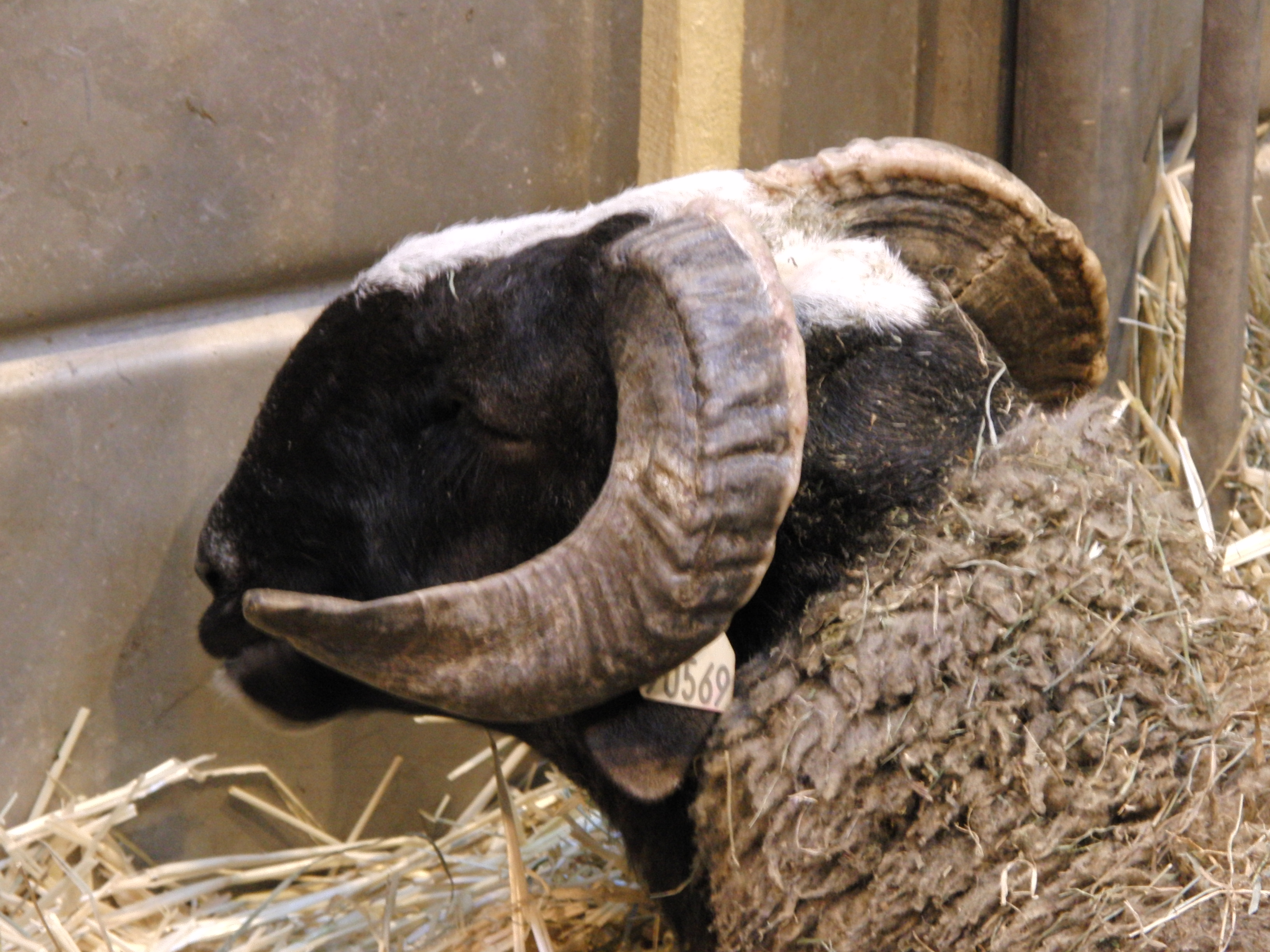
- Head of a ram, Salon international de l'agriculture, 2011
- Conservation status: FAO (2007): not at risk; DAD-IS (2026): at risk/vulnerable
- Other names: Chilhac; Mouton de Chilhac
- Country of origin: France
- Distribution: Allier; Aude; Aveyron; Charente-Maritime; Drôme; Doubs; Haute-Savoie; Hérault; Isère; Rhône; Vaucluse
- Use: dual-purpose, wool and meat

Traits
- Weight: Male: 75–90 kg; Female: 50–60 kg
- Height: Male: 80 cm; Female: 75 cm
- Skin colour: dark
- Wool colour: beige or grey-brown
- Face colour: dark with broad white blaze
- Horn status: males horned, ewes polled

Book illustration by Léon Barillot, 1912

The Bizet is a traditional French breed of sheep originating in the mountains of the Massif Central in south-central France. It is a dual-purpose sheep, reared both for meat and for wool. It is one of six traditional rustic sheep breeds of the massif, the others being the Blanche du Massif Central, the Grivette, the Limousine, the Noire du Velay and the Rava.

== History ==
The Bizet is a traditional rustic breed of the Auvergne cultural region, and particularly of the départements of Cantal, of Haute-Loire and of Puy-de-Dôme. In the twenty-first century it is also distributed in limited numbers in the départements of Allier, Aude, Aveyron, Charente-Maritime, Drôme, Doubs, Haute-Savoie, Hérault, Isère, Rhône and Vaucluse.

During the nineteenth century attempts were made to improve the Bizet by cross-breeding with other breeds including the Caussenarde des Garrigues and the British Dishley Leicester and Southdown. The resulting stock was not well adapted to the environmental conditions of the Massif Central and the attempts were abandoned. A breed society was formed in 1905 and a breed standard was drawn up. A flock-book was started in either 1945 or 1946. A breed society – Organisme de Sélection Races Ovines des Massifs or ROM Sélection – was established in 1997 for all six of the traditional rustic sheep breeds of the Massif Central: the Blanche du Massif Central, the Bizet, the Grivette, the Limousine, the Noire du Velay and the Rava.

The total number of the sheep fell throughout the twentieth century: it dropped from approximately 330000 head before the First World War to approximately 250000 in 1929 and to about 170000 in the 1930s, then to some 90000 in the 1960s and to about 10000 by 1983. In 2023 it was estimated at between 5800 and 6500 head, with 5577 breeding ewes and 137 active rams. In 2026 its conservation status was listed as 'at risk/vulnerable'.

=== Kerguelen Islands ===
Sheep were introduced to the Kerguelen Islands at various times from the late nineteenth century, with little success. In either 1948 or 1952 Bizet stock was introduced to the Île du Château, the Île Longue and the Île aux Moules; by the start of the twenty-first century only the Île Longue population remained. In about 2010 the decision was taken to eradicate all exotic mammals from the islands. Numbers of the Bizet fell from about 500 in 2011 to fewer than 30 in 2015; the extermination programme was completed in the following year, leaving no herbivore to keep down the invasive exotic forage grasses which had been introduced in the 1970s.

== Characteristics ==
It is a medium-sized sheep: average heights at the withers are about 75 cm for ewes and 80 cm for rams; body weights vary from 50 to 60 kg and from 75 to 90 kg respectively. The fleece is beige or grey-brown. The face and legs are dark or black and free of wool, with a broad white blaze the whole length of the face and some white markings to the legs also; the tip of the tail is also white. The mucosae are black. Rams are usually horned, ewes usually polled.

== Use ==
The sheep are reared principally for meat. The fleece is light, weighing some 2 to 2.5 kg for rams and 1 to 1.5 kg for ewes; the staple length is usually between 50 and 70 mm and the fibre diameter from 28 to 32 μm, equivalent to a Bradford Count of about 50s–56s.
