= Puy de Dôme =

Volcanic mountain in France

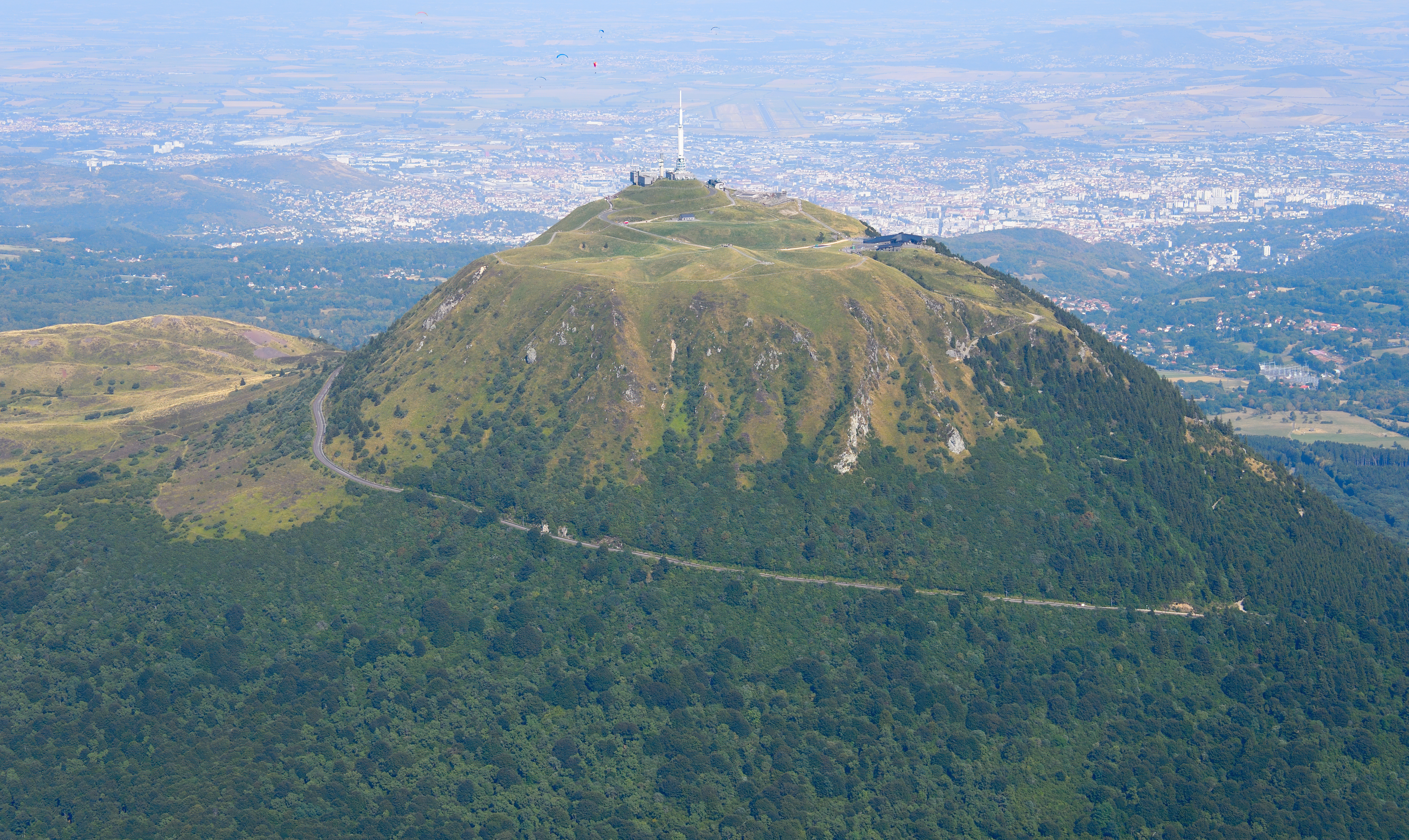
- Aerial view from the west with Clermont-Ferrand in the background

Highest point
- Elevation: 1,465 m (4,806 ft)
- Prominence: 485 m (1,591 ft)
- Isolation: 18.41 km (11.44 mi) to Puy de l'Aiguiller
- Coordinates: 45°46′19″N 02°57′45″E

Geography
- Location within France
- Location: Puy-de-Dôme, Auvergne, France
- Parent range: Chaîne des Puys region of Massif Central

Geology
- Mountain type: Lava dome
- Last eruption: c. 10,700 years ago

Climbing
- First ascent: Unknown
- Easiest route: road

Puy de Dôme (US: /ˌpwiː də ˈdoʊm/, French: [pɥi də dom]) is a lava dome and one of the youngest volcanoes in the Chaîne des Puys region of Massif Central in central France. This chain of volcanoes including numerous cinder cones, lava domes and maars is far from the edge of any tectonic plate.

Puy de Dôme was created by a Peléan eruption, some 10,700 years ago. It is approximately 10 km (6 miles) from Clermont-Ferrand. The Puy-de-Dôme département is named after the volcano.

== History ==
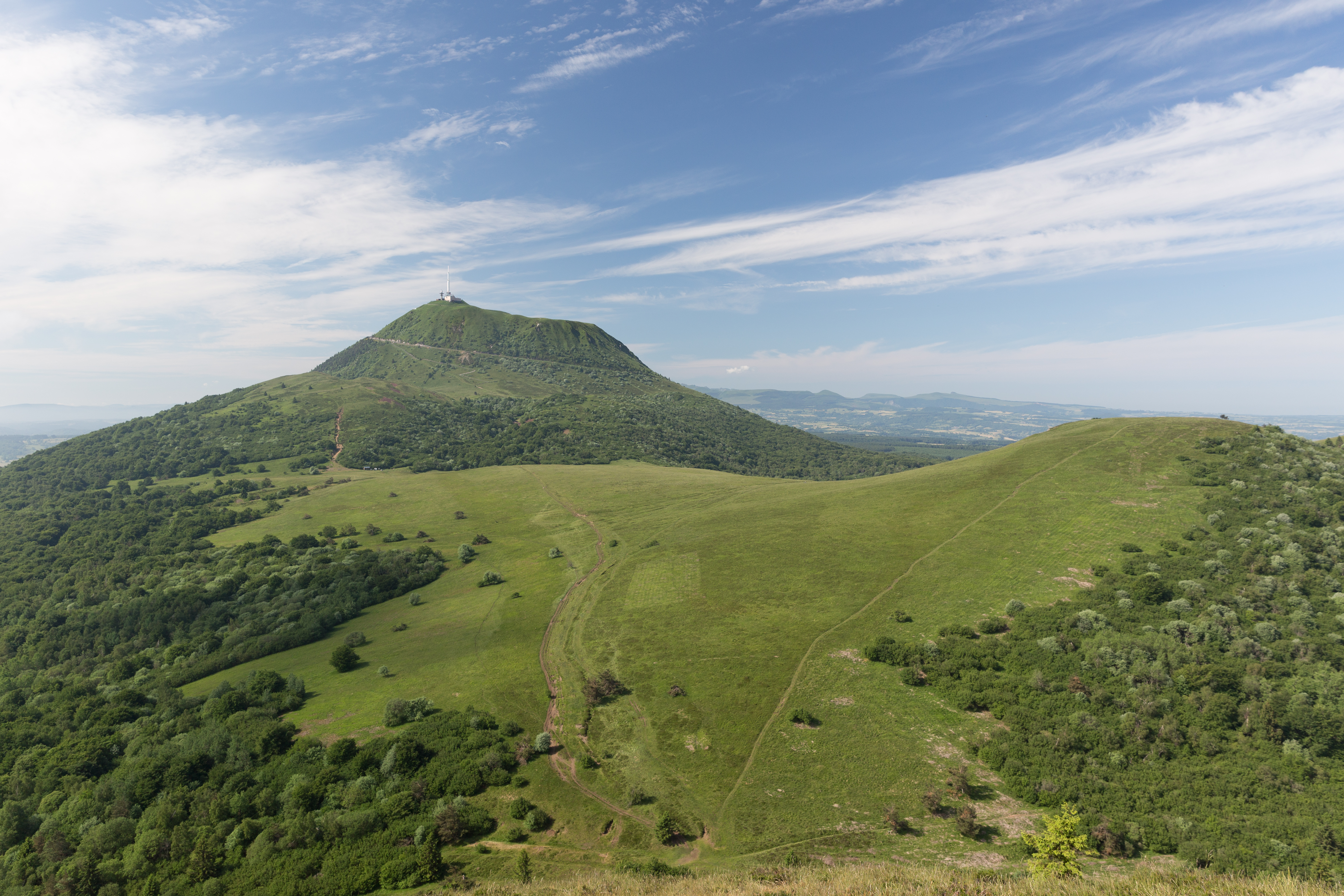
Puy de Dôme

In pre-Christian Europe, Puy de Dôme was an assembly place for spiritual ceremonies. Temples were built at the summit, including a Gallo-Roman temple of Mercury, the ruins of which were discovered in 1872.

In 1648, Florin Périer, at the urging of his brother-in-law Blaise Pascal, confirmed Evangelista Torricelli's theory that barometric observations were caused by the weight of air by measuring the height of a column of mercury at three elevations on Puy de Dôme.

In 1875, a physics laboratory was built at the summit. Since 1956, a TDF (Télédiffusion de France) antenna is also located there.

== Tourism ==
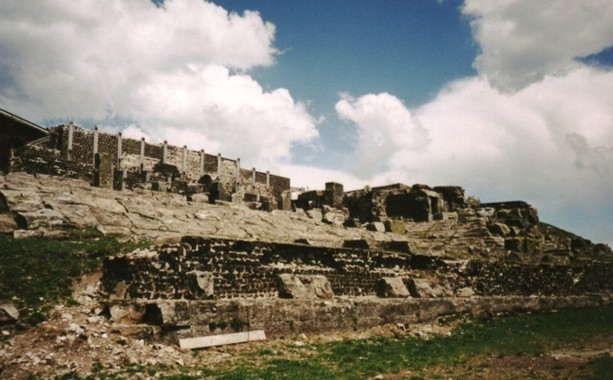
The Temple of Mercury before its reconstruction

A UNESCO World Heritage site since 2018, the Puy de Dôme is one of the most visited sites in the Auvergne region, attracting nearly 500,000 visitors a year. The summit offers expansive views of the Chaîne des Puys and Clermont-Ferrand. It is a well-known centre for paragliding.

The summit can be reached by two pedestrian paths. The southern one, Le sentier des muletiers ("The Mule Drivers' Trail"), was formerly a Roman road. The northern one, Le sentier des chèvres ("The Goat Trail"), runs past the Nid de la Poule (Hen's Nest} crater. The GR 4 long-distance trail includes both paths to cross the mountain.

Since May 2012, visitors can also go up the mountain by train with the Panoramique des Dômes, a rack railway.

A road exists along the railway but it is closed to general traffic, except for the military, service vehicles or emergencies.

At the top of the mountain, restaurants and shops are available as well as a visitor centre giving information on the history and geology of the area.

=== Geological heritage site ===
In respect of its key role in the development of volcanology as a geoscience discipline, the Puy-de-Dôme and Petite-Puy-de-Dôme volcanoes were included by the International Union of Geological Sciences (IUGS) in its assemblage of 100 "geological heritage sites" around the world in a listing published in October 2022.

== Sport ==
=== Cycling ===
In more recent times, Puy de Dôme has served as an occasional stage finish in the Tour de France. It was here that in 1964 Raymond Poulidor battled with Jacques Anquetil in one of the race's most famous moments, racing side by side up almost the entire climb; and that in 1975 Eddy Merckx was punched in the kidney by a spectator.

Between the 1988 and 2023 Tour de France summit finishes, only the first part of the ascent to the Col de Ceyssat was covered in the 13th stage of the 2020 Tour de France. The 2012 construction of the Puy de Dôme rack railway narrowed the already very narrow road to the top. Because of the increasing logistical demands of the Tour, many thought that the Tour would never return after 1988 but the 9th stage of the 2023 Tour de France had a summit finish, which was won by Michael Woods. However, spectators were not permitted on the climb.

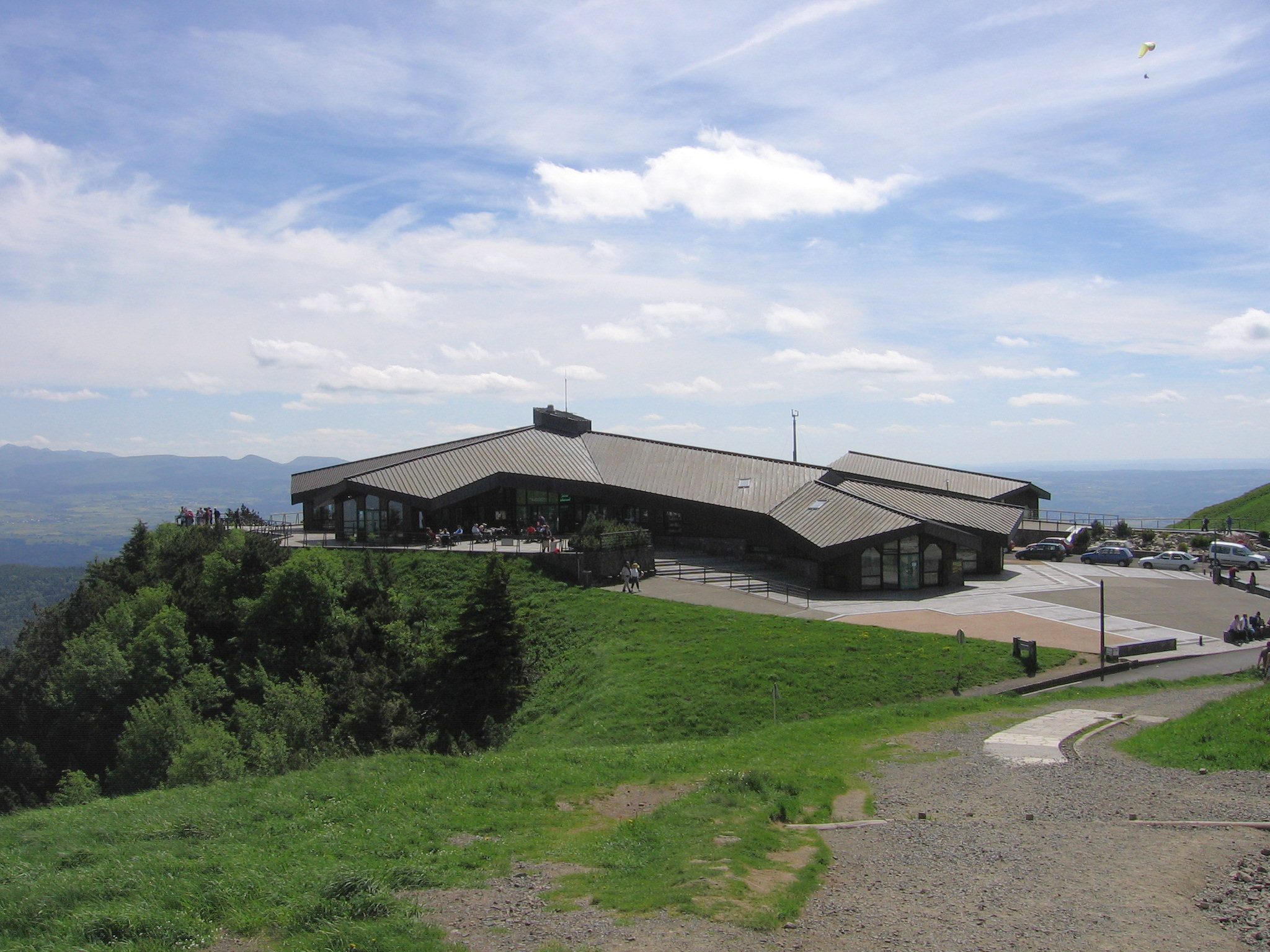
Tourist centre

The road is open to cyclists only during very limited periods when other vehicles are prohibited. In 2006 this was 7–9am on Wednesdays and Sundays between 1 May and 30 September. In 2017, it was the first checkpoint in the Transcontinental Race, a nonstop, unsupported bicycle race across Europe.

=== Motorsports ===
The Circuit de Charade was a motorsport street circuit built in 1957 using pre-existing roads around the base of the Puy de Dôme. The venue hosted the French Grand Prix as well as the French motorcycle Grand Prix several times in the 1960s and early 1970s. In 1986, the track was shortened due to safety issues and was converted into a dedicated motorsport race track hosting track days, driving schools as well as historic motorsport events.

== Climate ==
While the lower areas of the mountain are firmly oceanic (Köppen: Cfb), Puy de Dôme has a humid continental (Köppen: Dfb) with borderline subalpine characteristics, thanks to its high elevation. Its classification is determined from its January average being well below the −3 °C (27 °F) threshold (with −5 °C (23 °F) as its usual lows), and from having over four months of average temperatures that exceed 10 °C (50 °F). (The requirement for this climate category is to have at least three such months.)

Climate data for Puy de Dôme (1981–2010 normals; extremes 1973–2017)
Month	Jan	Feb	Mar	Apr	May	Jun	Jul	Aug	Sep	Oct	Nov	Dec	Year
Record high °C (°F)	14.0 (57.2)	12.8 (55.0)	18.0 (64.4)	20.8 (69.4)	22.7 (72.9)	28.4 (83.1)	26.8 (80.2)	28.3 (82.9)	24.4 (75.9)	21.3 (70.3)	17.1 (62.8)	17.0 (62.6)	28.4 (83.1)
Mean daily maximum °C (°F)	−0.5 (31.1)	0.1 (32.2)	3.6 (38.5)	7.8 (46.0)	9.8 (49.6)	13.6 (56.5)	16.7 (62.1)	16.8 (62.2)	12.8 (55.0)	9.3 (48.7)	5.1 (41.2)	0.5 (32.9)	8.2 (46.8)
Daily mean °C (°F)	−2.9 (26.8)	−2.6 (27.3)	0.9 (33.6)	4.5 (40.1)	6.9 (44.4)	10.3 (50.5)	13.2 (55.8)	13.5 (56.3)	10.1 (50.2)	6.3 (43.3)	2.7 (36.9)	−2.2 (28.0)	4.7 (40.5)
Mean daily minimum °C (°F)	−5.4 (22.3)	−5.2 (22.6)	−1.8 (28.8)	1.2 (34.2)	3.9 (39.0)	7.0 (44.6)	9.7 (49.5)	10.2 (50.4)	7.5 (45.5)	3.3 (37.9)	0.3 (32.5)	−4.8 (23.4)	2.3 (36.1)
Record low °C (°F)	−16.5 (2.3)	−19.0 (−2.2)	−14.2 (6.4)	−10.0 (14.0)	−9.0 (15.8)	−3.0 (26.6)	1.0 (33.8)	2.0 (35.6)	−2.0 (28.4)	−7.0 (19.4)	−12.0 (10.4)	−16.8 (1.8)	−19.0 (−2.2)
Average precipitation mm (inches)	51.5 (2.03)	41.3 (1.63)	29.4 (1.16)	30.9 (1.22)	65.0 (2.56)	75.6 (2.98)	67.9 (2.67)	53.8 (2.12)	62.9 (2.48)	40.9 (1.61)	43.2 (1.70)	53.5 (2.11)	610.0 (24.02)
Average precipitation days	11.5	8.5	9.2	6.0	10.3	9.6	10.3	9.4	9.0	10.3	10.3	16.0	120.4
Source 1: Météo Climat
Source 2: Météo Climat
