= Noire du Velay =

Breed of sheep

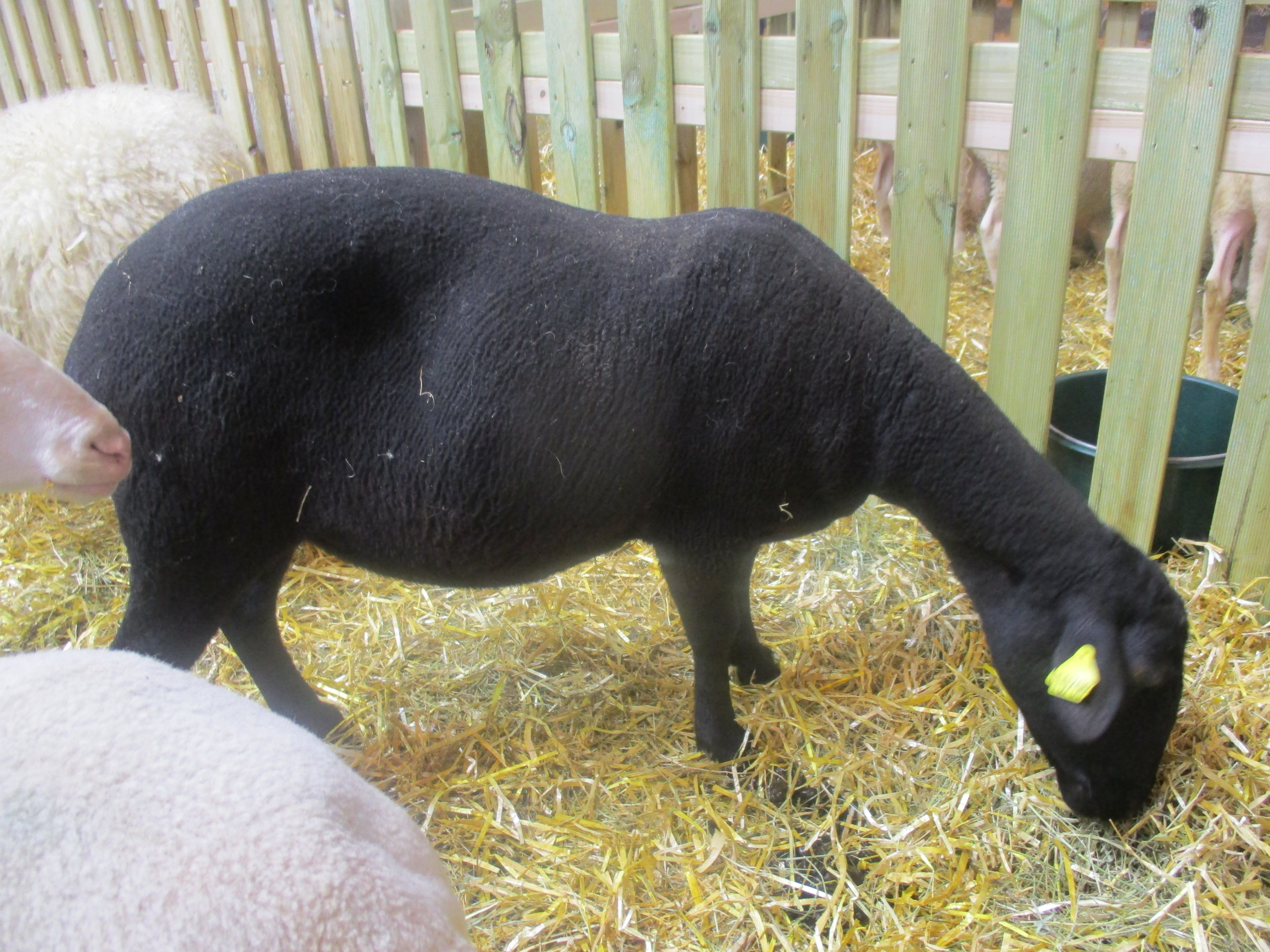
- At the 2018 Paris International Agricultural Show
- Other names: Velay Black
- Country of origin: France

Traits
- Weight: Male: 70-100kg; Female: 50-70kg

The Noire du Velay is a French breed of domestic sheep.
