= Roman Settlement of the Col de Ceyssat =

Roman town

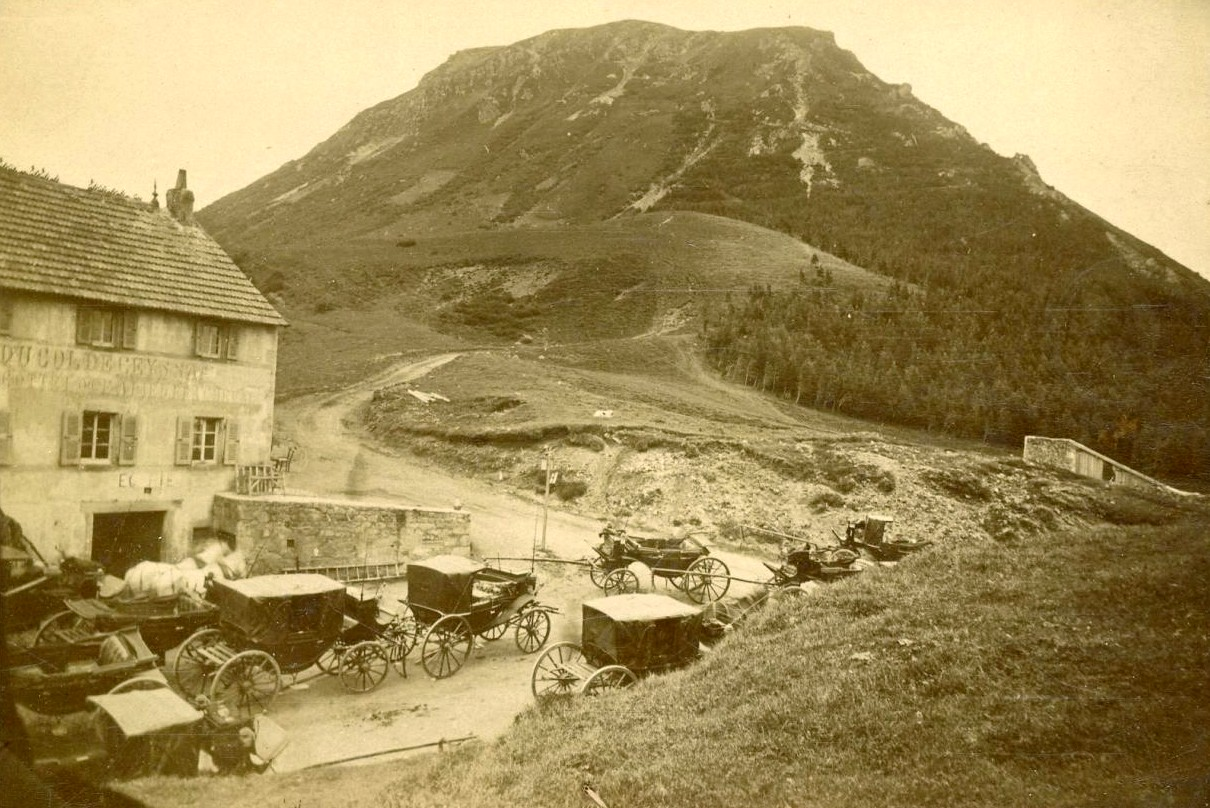
- Puy Redon/Lacroix and Puy de Dôme seen from the Col de Ceyssat around 1885.

- Location within France
- 45°45′48″N 2°57′20″E
- Periods: La Tène finale; Early Empire (1st- 3rd century)
- Location: France
- Region: Arverni (current Puy-de-Dôme)

Site notes
- Length: 1,000–1,150 m
- Area: 10–15 ha

The Roman settlement of the Col de Ceyssat is a modest Roman town situated between 1,000 and 1,150 meters in altitude, at the base of the Puy de Dôme and its sanctuary dedicated to Mercury. The settlement is located in the center of the territory of the Arverni city, in Aquitaine Gaul, about ten kilometers from its capital, Augustonemetum/Clermont-Ferrand.

The site of the col itself was occupied as early as the end of the protohistoric period, although the nature of this occupation remains unknown. The foundation of the secondary Roman settlement dates back to the first century AD. The settlement was structured by the Agrippa road between Lugdunum (Lyon) and Mediolanum Santonum (Saintes), covering between ten and fifteen hectares. It comprised four recognized sectors. The roadside station, situated at the col and close to the Agrippa road, represents the central nucleus of the settlement. While regulating the flow of travelers and pilgrims wishing to climb the Puy de Dôme to access the summit sanctuary of Mercury, its function probably was to provide lodging, food, and shops for travelers from all directions. The northern part of the site, which marks the point of departure for the ascent of the sacred mountain, features a cult area where a sanctuary once stood. This has been discerned through surveys and the ceramic study has confirmed its existence. In contrast, the funerary zone, situated in the southeast of the cult sector, encompasses one of the most substantial funeral pyres in Gaul, as revealed by archaeological excavation. The lower quarter, situated approximately 400 meters west of the col and adjacent to the Agrippa road, represents the final sector of the settlement. Its abandonment, which occurred after the mid-third century, remains a subject of historical inquiry.

Similar to the other territories of the Chaîne des Puys, the Col de Ceyssat has undergone significant reforestation efforts since the late 19th century. Despite the challenging terrain and limited accessibility, archaeological knowledge of the ancient settlement has primarily been shaped by systematic archaeological operations, surveys, and pedestrian prospections conducted under the guidance of Frédéric Trément from the University of Clermont-Ferrand. Additionally, some rescue archaeology surveys, associated with land development projects, have provided insights into the ancient town on an intermittent basis.

== Contexts ==
=== Geographical context ===
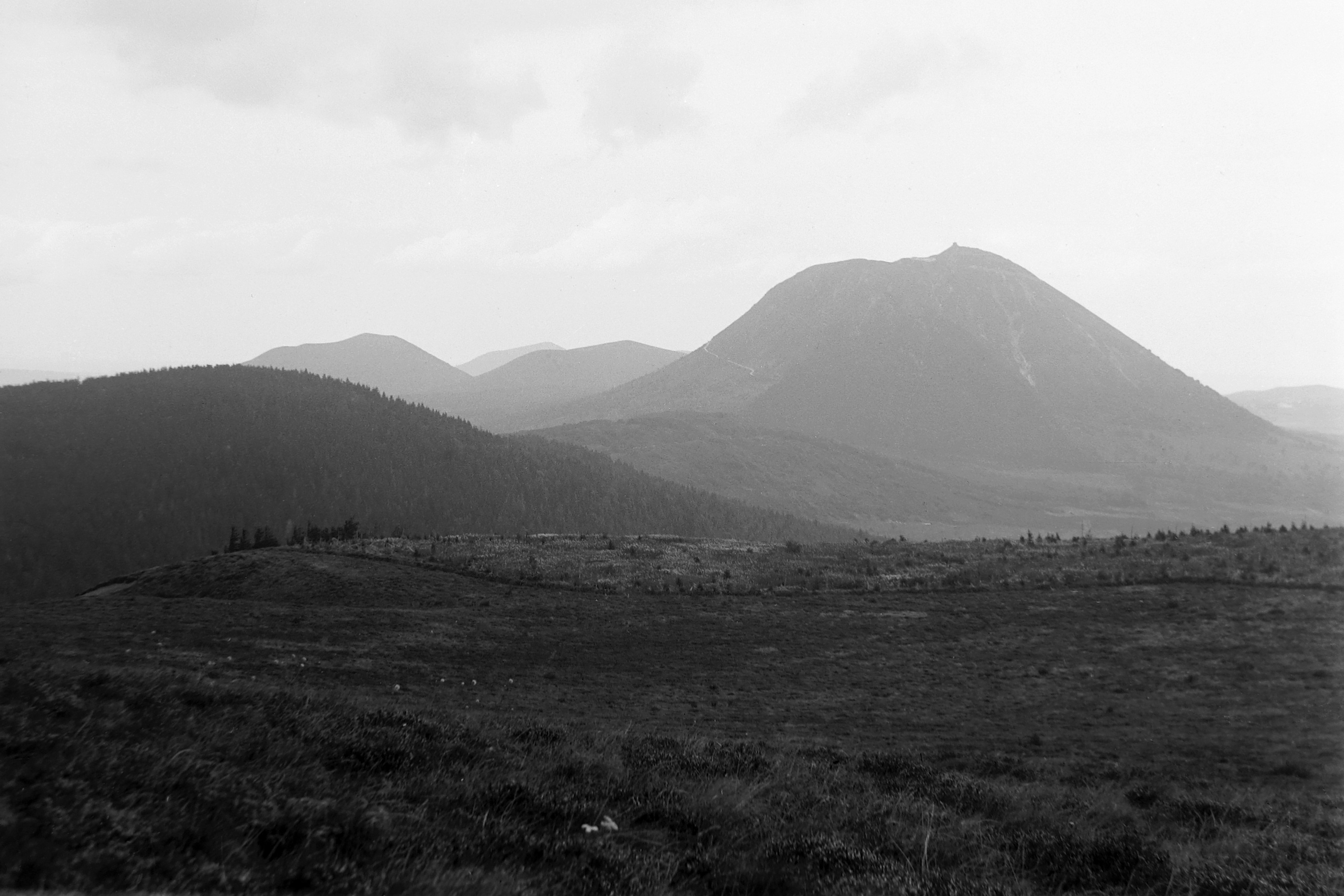
View of the Puy des Grosmanaux in the foreground on the left, the Puy de Dôme in the background on the right and the Col de Ceyssat at its foot (1930s photograph).

The Col de Ceyssat is situated at the base of the southern slope of the Puy de Dôme, the highest peak in the Chaîne des Puys, which can be observed from a distance of at least several tens of kilometers. Peaking at 1,077 meters in altitude, the col was, until the 18th century, the primary communication route between the expansive Limagne plain to the east, the Dore mountains to the southwest, and the Combrailles to the northwest. The Col de Ceyssat itself corresponds to the tripoint between the communes of Ceyssat, Saint-Genès-Champanelle, and Orcines.

The settlement is situated at an altitude between 1,000 and 1,150 meters and is encircled by numerous volcanoes. To the north is the Puy Lacroix, formerly known as Puy. The southern flank of the Puy de Dôme which constitutes 40 to 50% of the volcano and is accessible via the Muleteers' Path. To the south is the Puy des Grosmanaux, while to the southwest is the Puy Besace.

The climate is marked by some extreme weather conditions, including severe winters, violent storms during the summer months, and a high level of precipitation, in the form of rain and fog. The forest covering the col consists of spruces and beeches, planted between the late 19th and early 20th centuries as part of a large-scale reforestation program for the Chaîne des Puys. While this wooded relief occasionally presented challenges to research, it also served to protect the site by mitigating the erosion of the slopes, whose sediments have long covered the remains. This has allowed, for instance, the preservation of some walls at a height of more than a meter.

The geology of the Col de Ceyssat is defined by trachytic eruptive products from the Kilian explosion crater, which extend to the col. Human occupation during antiquity resulted in the construction of terraces that significantly altered the organization of the terrain until the site's abandonment and subsequent collapse.

=== Archaeological context ===
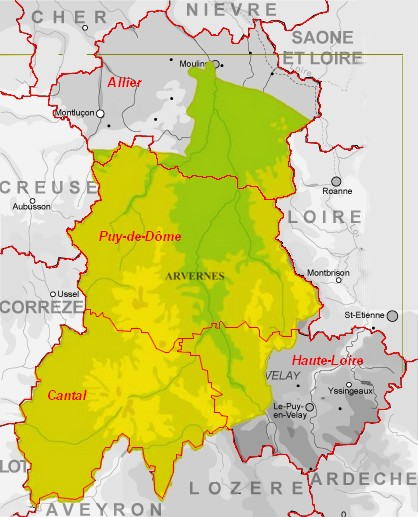
The territory of the city of Arvernes in Roman times.

The archaeological site of the Col de Ceyssat is situated within the territory of the ancient Arverni city, which encompasses the entirety of the departments of Puy-de-Dôme and Cantal, the south and southeast of the department of Allier, and the northwest third of the department of Haute-Loire. The civitas Arvernorum is the successor state of the Gallic city of Arverni and was part of the province of Aquitaine. Its capital, Augustonemetum, was constructed at the end of the first century BC at the site of the future city of Clermont-Ferrand, situated approximately 10 kilometers east of the secondary settlement of the Col de Ceyssat.

Except for the Mercury temple located at the summit of the Puy de Dôme, the archaeological context of the settlement remains largely unstudied. However, several sites within a few kilometers of the settlement, in the communes of Ceyssat and Orcines, have been documented.

In the 1970s, the thermal section of a Roman villa was excavated approximately 4.5 kilometers west of the col itself (approximately 4 kilometers west of the lower quarter settlement). This site, known as "Prés Bonjean," is located in the commune of Ceyssat. Although the precise date of its occupation remains uncertain, it does not appear to extend beyond the end of the third century. In the commune of Orcines, to the east, at a place called La Baraque, approximately five kilometers from the col, the existence of another opulent rural residence, also interpreted as a villa, was revealed by the discovery of mosaic tesserae in the late nineteenth century. The final documented reference to a wealthy rural residence is located in the commune of Orcines, at a site known as Mazière/Mazeiras. A Gallic coin hoard was discovered in the mid-19th century, while significant Roman constructions were reported at the end of the same century, along with hypocaust tubules. Subsequent excavations were conducted in the 1980s, uncovering additional remains across an estimated 1-hectare area. While the authors of Carte archéologue du Puy-de-Dôme (Puy-de-Dôme Archaeological Map) interpret these findings as indicative of a villa, the excavator posits that they may represent a waystation situated before the ascent of the Puy de Dôme.

In the late 19th century, three inscriptions on domite were unearthed in the commune of Orcines, in a location designated as La Tourette. These inscriptions, (Note: All notices about the epigraphic inscriptions of the Arverni city, as published in 1996 (Rémy 1996), are accessible in their entirety via the online database of the "Programme d'Enregistrement, Traitement et Reconnaissance Automatique en Épigraphie (PETRAE)". Archived from the original on 29 November 1998. The notice number accompanying the pagination of each reference to Rémy 1996 is identical to the notice number available on the PETRAE website for each inscription.) two of which are engraved on statues, constitute dedications to Mercury made by Vindonius Silvanus (Note: First inscription: Merc(urio) sacr(um) | Vindon(ius) | Siluanus (CIL XIII, 01518 archive): "Dedicated to Mercury, Vindonius Silvanus (offered this dedication)" (Rémy 1996, pp. 117–118, notice 44). Second inscription: [Mer]c(urio) sacr(um), Vind[on(ius)] Siluan[us] (CIL XIII, 01518 archive): "Dedicated to Mercury, Vindonius Silvanus (offered this statue)" (Rémy 1996, p. 118, notice 45). Third inscription: Merc(urio) sạcr(um) | [Vi]ndọṇiu[s] | Silu[anus] ('CIL XIII, 01519 archive): "Dedicated to Mercury, Vindonius Silvanus (offered this statue)" (Rémy 1996, p. 119, notice 46).) and have been dated to the period between 151 and 180 by Bernard Rémy. Two additional, albeit more fragmentary, (Note: First inscription: MA (CIL XIII, 01520 archive (Rémy 1996, pp. 136–137, notice 66). Second inscription: ND (CIL XIII, 01520 archive (Rémy 1996, p. 137, notice 67).) inscriptions on domite were also documented later in the same century. Furthermore, another statue fragment and a trident, whose discovery was reported at La Baraque, are believed to originate from this site. The discovery of these three dedications led to the interpretation of the site as a small sanctuary of Mercury, situated close to the Roman road. Additionally, a milestone erected by Claudius was also unearthed in the surrounding area. However, despite extensive research conducted in 2019 at the same location, the precise location of the earlier discoveries could not be determined.

== Historiography ==
=== Ancient discoveries ===
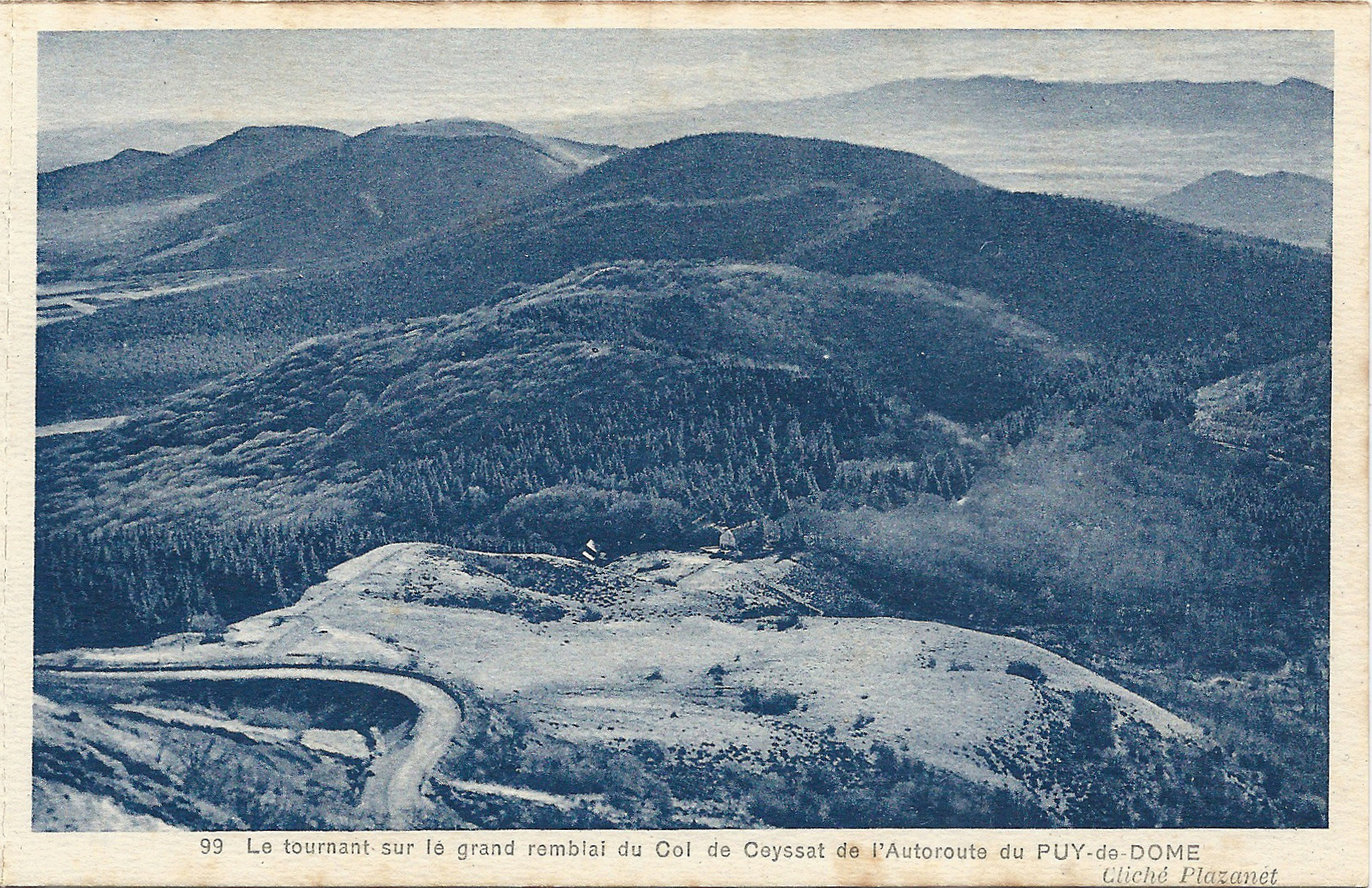
The Col de Ceyssat seen from the Puy de Dôme, circa 1930.

The earliest known reference to the discovery of human remains at the Col de Ceyssat can be traced back to the early nineteenth century. In his writings, Baron La Force mentions earlier excavations conducted by the architect Ledru, as well as his observations. The architectural terracotta, ceramics, and constructions are frequently reported throughout the same century, notably by Henri Lecoq, Jean-Baptiste Bouillet, and Pierre-Pardoux Mathieu. The latter author dedicated a study to the Puy de Dôme in 1875, thereby enabling him to expand the inventory of discoveries made at the foot of the summit sanctuary.

Towards the end of the century, Émile Alluard drew the attention of the Clermont-Ferrand Academy to the threats facing the archaeological remains. Following the destruction of a house by fire in 1886, two trenches, each measuring 20 × 2 meters, were opened up. Captain Noir de Chazournes, who had been tasked by General de Champvallier with surveying the site, observed "unequivocal traces of construction, but which, at first glance at least, do not reveal any significant monuments." The development of the col led to the discovery of additional artifacts, including architectural fragments and a stele unearthed during the excavation of foundations for a stable in the winter of 1886–1887. These items were subsequently transferred to the National Archaeology Museum.

Auguste Audollent, a professor of history at the University of Clermont, developed an interest in the summit of the Puy de Dôme when a funicular project was initiated and excavations were conducted at its summit under his direction and that of the architect Gabriel Ruprich-Robert. These excavations provided a valuable opportunity to gather information from workers and the local population, particularly regarding the discoveries made at the Col de Ceyssat. The construction of the new access road to the summit of the Puy de Dôme also resulted in the discovery of a statue in 1906. This was found at a depth of approximately 150 meters below the intersection of the new road with the path leading from Ceyssat to the summit of the Puy de Dôme. The fragment was identified as part of a landslide that had fallen from the embankment onto the snow of the trench.

The precise date of discovery is unknown for various finds that probably date to the late 19th or early 20th century. These include a bracelet donated by Georges Desdevises Du Dézert, a bronze statuette, a Hallstatt bracelet/leg ring, and common and sigillated ceramics.

The site was largely forgotten until the late 1950s and early 1960s when sporadic discoveries were made. However, the col is still referenced in publications on Roman roads.

The 1980s and 1990s were distinguished by a series of clandestine excavations.

=== Rediscovery of the site ===
At the turn of the 2000s, research on the Col de Ceyssat experienced a resurgence, driven by a convergence of academic inquiry, rescue archaeology initiatives, and the repercussions of the 1999 storm on the surrounding forest landscape. As part of her master's thesis on land occupation in several communes of the Chaîne des Puys, Lucile Humbert, a student at the Blaise Pascal University under the direction of Frédéric Trément, undertook a review of the archaeological documentation about the commune of Ceyssat. As a result of the storm of 1999, a preventive archaeology operation was conducted in June of that year. This operation included preliminary surveys conducted before the construction of parking areas near the Auberge des Muletiers at the col, as well as pedestrian surveys. As a result of this operation, it became possible to consider the existence of a secondary Roman settlement. In addition, the demolition of the old ruined inn was monitored archaeologically, leading to the recovery of several reused trachyte blocks.

In the subsequent year, the regional archaeology service prescribed the implementation of a monitoring program for the Muleteers' Path project. The initial surveys, spearheaded by Frédéric Trément, were conducted in April of the same year to accurately delineate the characteristics of the structures excavated between the late 1970s and 1980s in the northern sector of the Col de Ceyssat. Additional surveys conducted to the south of the archaeological site focused on the clandestinely excavated pit, which had been initially interpreted as a favissa. However, subsequent investigation revealed it to be a funeral pyre pit. These operations were continued the following year, with pedestrian surveys conducted in March–April, April–May, and June–August. A total of 31 transects with spot surveys were conducted at the site of 19th-century observations on Puy Lacroix to estimate the chronology and extent of the archaeological site. Topographic surveys were conducted the following year. Between June and July 2003, a long transect was conducted west of the Col de Ceyssat, at the level of the Puy Besace, at the site of the Roman road and an ancient building previously discovered. The current state of knowledge of the Col de Ceyssat is primarily due to the operations led by Frédéric Trément, which have allowed for the archaeological documentation of various sectors of the settlement.

From 2003 to 2020, only a few instances of preventive archaeology operations involved the Col de Ceyssat area. These included a diagnostic study conducted at the col's parking area in November 2003, the installation of a drinking water supply network to the summit of the Puy de Dôme in March–April 2012, and finally the redevelopment of the Auberge des Muletiers in April 2019. Despite the limited temporal and spatial scope of these operations, they facilitated comprehensive sampling of the entire ancient settlement.

=== New research ===
Since 2020, new research conducted by Frédéric Trément of the Clermont Auvergne University has resulted in the completion of a 64-hectare Lidar survey, which has served to refine the digital terrain model across the entire settlement and a portion of the Agrippa road's route. Meanwhile, a geophysical ground-penetrating radar survey has enabled the creation of 18 profiles in the western part of the lower quarter, in preparation for new research projects at the Col de Ceyssat.

Scheduled surveys were conducted in May–June 2021 in the lower quarter under the direction of Frédéric Trément and are ongoing in 2022. The principal objective of these surveys is to document the route and profile of the Agrippa road, with a particular focus on the hollow way situated to the west of the Col de Ceyssat.

== The settlement ==
=== The Agrippa road ===
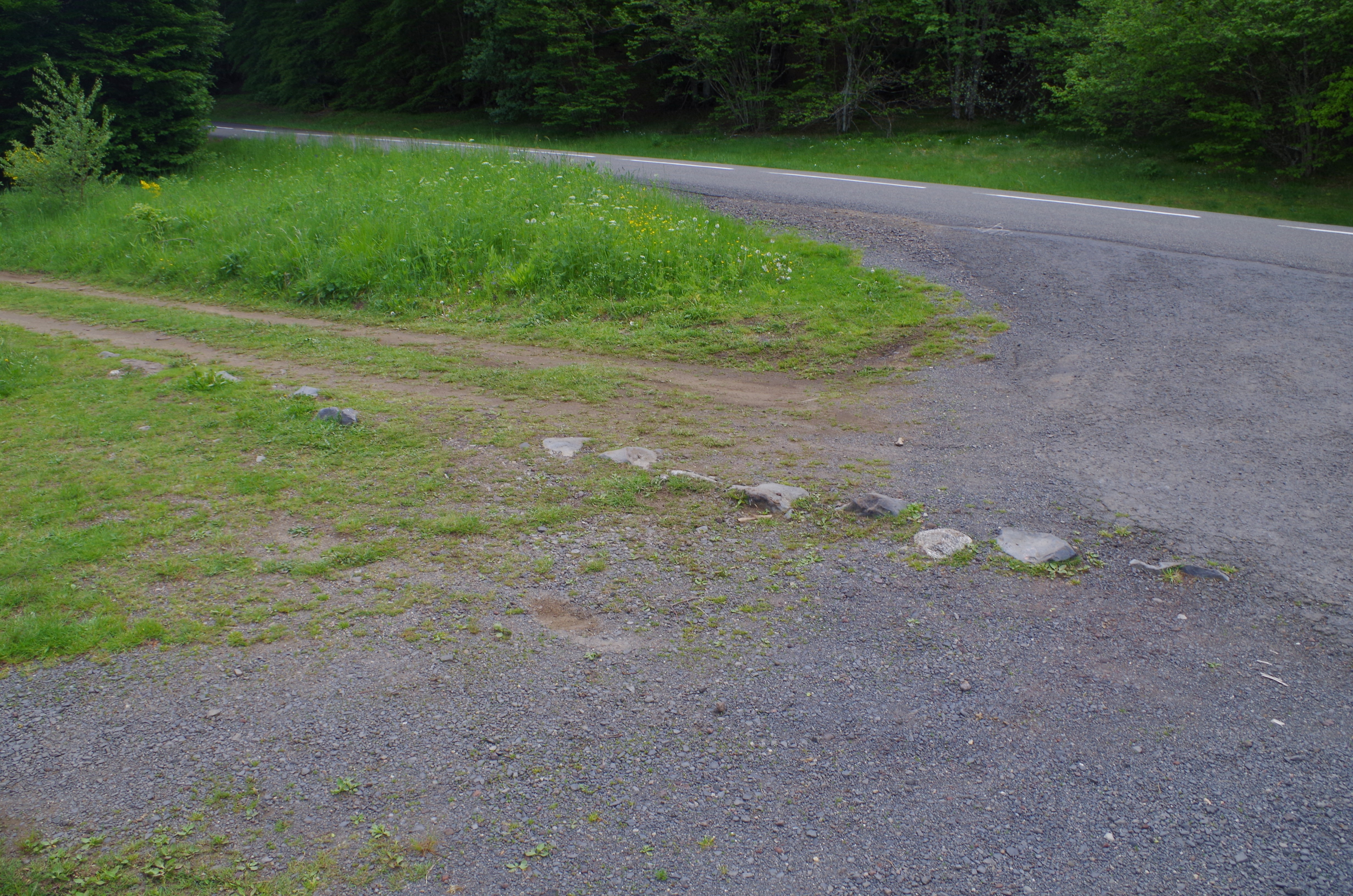
Umbones of the Agrippa Roman road still visible in the western quarter.

The hypothesis that the Roman Agrippa road, which ran from Lugdunum to Mediolanum Santonum (modern-day Lyon to Saintes), passed through the Col de Ceyssat has been posited since the early 19th century, following an article by François Pasumot. This hypothesis was reiterated during the same century by Jean-Baptiste Bouillet and Pierre-Pardoux Mathieu, and in the following century by Pierre-François Fournier and Pierre Denimal.

The initial archaeological evidence of a road at the Col de Ceyssat dates back to the 1999 diagnostic phase, during which a cobblestone foundation of at least 0.40 meters in thickness and observed to be over 8 meters in width was tentatively identified as part of the Agrippa road, given that it lacked a dateable context. The Col de Ceyssat represents the highest point (1,077 meters in altitude) of this significant east-west Roman road axis.

This axis, which appears to have structured the settlement's organization, was also observed in the lower quarter, where several dozen umbones—stones crowning the sidewalk raised above the road—were still visible in the early 2020s. These umbones were observed in some surveys of the building adjacent to the road. The distance of 6.50 meters between the two rows of umbones permits the calculation of the width of the road surface, while the bordering ditches are spaced 22 meters apart. The construction of the road is dated to the early 1st century. While the 25% slope east of the col is mitigated by the presence of hairpin turns, the road takes the form of an S-shaped hollow way observed as early as the 2000s in its western part, at the level of the lower quarter, with a regular slope of about 10%, according to the latest research.

The five surveys, which commenced in 2021 in the lower quarter, are primarily designed to document the route of the Agrippa road and the hollow way situated to the west of the Ceyssat settlement. The road's final state before entering the hollow way is estimated to be 8.50 meters in width. This is then associated with an 8-meter-wide surface, which may correspond to an avoidance zone. In the hollow way, the road is observed to be narrow (1.40 meters), which is also attributed to poor preservation. Additionally, the road is subject to erosion, necessitating the construction of terraces and a ditch designed to channel water and debris.

The Lidar survey conducted in 2020 has enabled the route of the road at the col level to be refined, thus distinguishing it from the old medieval and modern roads that partially followed its path.

Although the route of the Agrippa road is identified at several points west of the Col de Ceyssat, its precise itinerary remains uncertain between Augustonemetum and the Col de Ceyssat. However, the presence of a milestone at Orcines allows for an approximate route to be delineated.

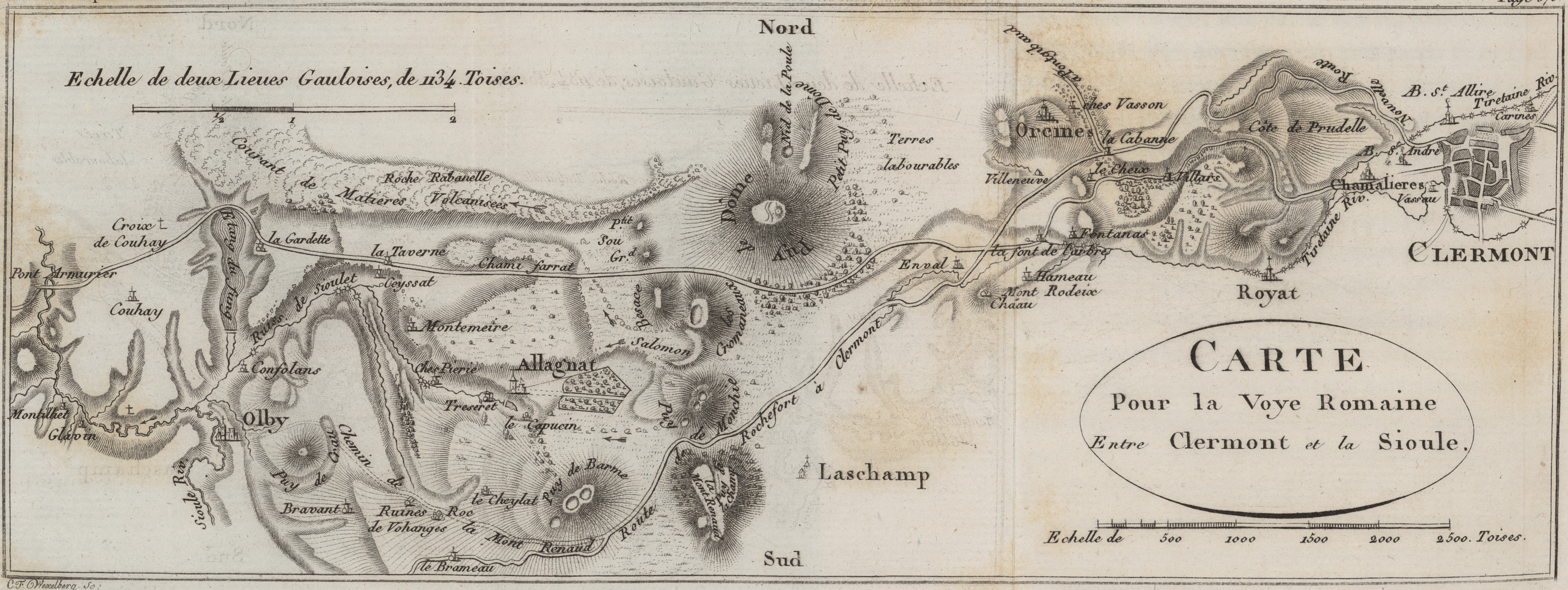
Itinerary of Agrippa's route west of Clermont-Ferrand (François Pasumot, 1810).

=== Central sector ===
Map of the urban area after Trément 2013b, p. 73

The urban component of the Roman settlement is situated at the Col de Ceyssat, at the present location of the inn and parking lot. Our understanding of this central sector, which was near the Agrippa road, is primarily derived from historical documentation, particularly from the nineteenth century.

The protohistoric occupation of this sector is poorly understood, except for some ceramic fragments dated to La Tène D (150–30 BC), which were discovered at the bottom of pits. These fragments have a chronology that coincides with the initial indications of a La Tène occupation at the summit of the Puy de Dôme. Additionally, a knife found in debris may also date to the Protohistory period.

The bibliography contains numerous reports of the discovery of walls. The only interventions that led to the excavation of the ground during the reconstruction of the house destroyed by fire yielded second and third-century ceramics, a coin of Diocletian, and architectural fragments. The architectural fragments may indicate the proximity of a monumental structure, while the large wall caps, whose precise function within the settlement is uncertain, could represent the remains of a monumental enclosure wall separating different sections of the settlement or bordering the Roman road.

The buildings observed in this sector during recent interventions are all characterized by careful construction using small and medium regular trachyte stones. Their chronology consistently corresponds to the 2nd century and the early 3rd century, while no trace of subsequent occupation has been observed. Additionally, earthworks and pits from the High Empire have been noted. In this sector, the density of remains has been confirmed by the succession of several preventive archaeological operations.

The undated road section was unearthed during the 1999 archaeological evaluation excavation in the central sector, situated on the opposite side of the ruin located to the west, in the bend of departmental road 68.

The central sector, which has been interpreted as the roadside relay located at the heart of the settlement, is estimated to cover 2 or 3 hectares. The artifacts discovered there appear to testify more to the activities of daily life than to the specialization of the area.

=== Cult area ===
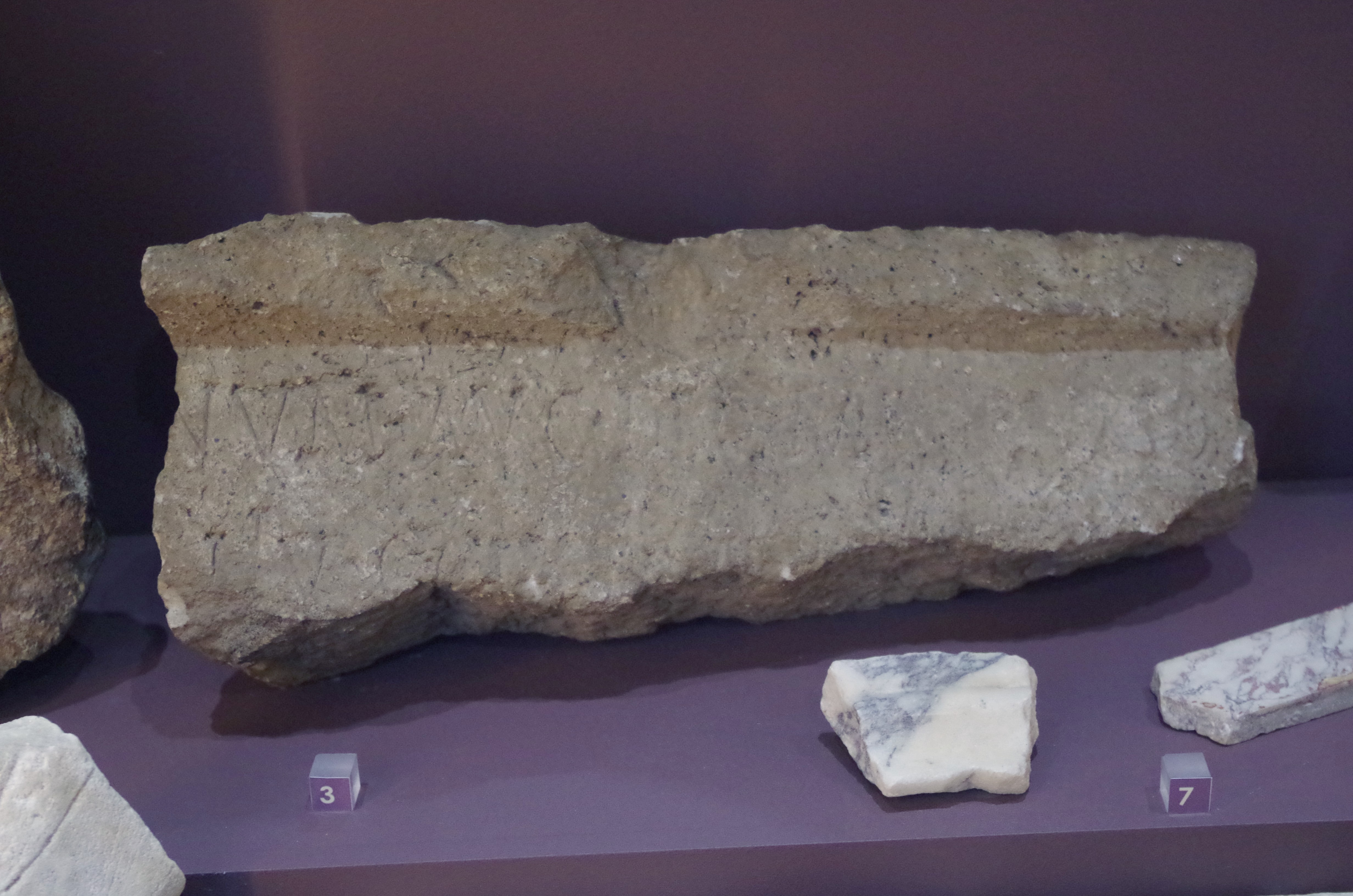

The northern sector of the settlement is situated at the base of the southern slope of Puy de Dôme, on a plateau known as Puy Lacroix, previously designated as Puy Redon. The site was the subject of several clandestine excavations during the 1970s and 1980s, and the first soundings were conducted by Frédéric Trément. It is noteworthy that ancient discoveries in this area are scarce. However, a notable exception is a dedication (Note: The dedication is preserved in the Bargoin Museum (Rémy 1996, p. 125).) to the divine power of Augustus and Mercury, which was dated between the late 2nd and early 3rd century. This was discovered in 1906, 150 m south of the intersection between the Chemin des Muletiers and the access road to Puy de Dôme. "To the divine power of Augustus and to the god Mercury, Livius (?) Coi, and Ca placed this monument." (Note: Num(ini) Aug(usti),| deo Mercurio,[.]Lui(ius?) COI[---] | --- (CIL XIII, 11164 archive) (Rémy 1996, pp. 125–126, notice 52).)

This sector has been occupied since the final La Tène period, but the nature of this occupation is unknown. A palisade may correspond to a space boundary or the support of a terracing system. Earthworks carried out from the Augustan period onwards disrupted the sector's topography, allowing for the construction of buildings perpendicular to the slope.

The walls and buildings identified during soundings and surveys often provide evidence of meticulously constructed structures in reticulated masonry using volcanic ejecta from the surrounding mountains, including trachyte, basalt, and scoria. Among the network of constructions, one building has notably yielded marble, a fragment of sculpture in domite, and a mother goddess in white clay from the Allier, while others have produced hypocaust pipes and painted plaster, and even mosaic tesserae. The presence of many luxurious elements (marble, painted plaster, hypocaust, and architectural elements) suggests an intent to monumentalize the area.

A centrally planned building with dimensions of 30 meters on each side has yielded painted plaster and fragments of a statuette in white clay from the Allier. These findings have prompted the interpretation of the structure as a potential sanctuary. The results of the ceramic analysis lend support to the cultic hypothesis for this area. (Note: The ceramic study conducted by Jérôme Trescarte was published in 2007 (Trescarte 2007) and then again in 2010 in a slightly different form: Trescarte, Jérôme (2010). "Céramiques et pratiques rituelles : l'exemple du complexe cultuel du puy de Dôme". La Praxis municipale dans l'Occident romain. Histoires croisées (in French). Clermont-Ferrand: Presses Universitaires Blaise-Pascal. pp. 499–547. ISBN 978-2-84516-480-2.) Jérôme Trescarte identifies the presence of white clay statuettes from the Allier region and bowls with white slip and white slip accented with red or orange lines, which are characteristic of cultic contexts, particularly among the Arverni, as evidenced by the findings at the Source des Roches. Nevertheless, the ceramic analysis has revealed the presence of numerous common ceramics with sandy temper that exhibit clear indications of ritual manipulation. The majority of the vessels are cooking pots and jugs/kettles. The vessels' bodies have been methodically broken to retrieve only the bottoms, which are sometimes perforated from the inside. This practice has been observed in other contexts, including Augustonemetum and the urn field necropolis at Argentomagus. Similarly, some fine ceramics, such as terra nigra, exhibit comparable treatment. Other vessels have been decollared, and their rims have sometimes been mutilated. This practice may be associated with the presence of graffiti on the rims. It can thus be postulated that some vessels may have been repurposed from their domestic use into the cultic sphere, potentially transforming them into ex-votos. A certain number of these vessels were burned before or after being broken, which led Jérôme Trescarte to suggest that culinae may have existed where food offerings were burned. The successive emptying of these hearths may have been deposited in favissa, which would explain the discovery of such a large number of vessels that underwent similar treatment.

The overwhelming majority of individuals among the common ceramics with sandy temper are light-common ceramics (93%). These are primarily cooking pots, collared pots, and especially jugs/kettles, which exhibit evidence of heating. This latter category, which is highly standardized in the case of the Col de Ceyssat, represents 15% of the minimum number of individuals in Sector 1, all types of ceramics combined. Jugs/kettles are rarely found in domestic contexts; however, they may have been used for a variety of purposes in cultic and funerary contexts. In cultic contexts, they may have been used to store liquids, heat liquids, or for libation or ablution purposes by the faithful and priests. In funerary contexts, they may have been used in funeral pyres, as observed in the necropolis at Col de Ceyssat.

A total of 72 pieces of graffiti, either representing abbreviated formulas or initials, were identified on ceramics in Sector 1, predominantly on fire pots, including jugs and kettles. The presence of this graffiti on the narrow rim and spout suggests a potential link with the pouring of the liquid contained in the vessel, or with the cult of Mercury, in the case of the graffiti DVX.

The "cult complex" is situated in a prominent position relative to the roadside relay, on its periphery, and at the initial point of the ascent of the sacred mountain. The cultic practices of the Puy Lacroix sanctuary exhibit similarities with those of the summit sanctuary. However, research conducted at both the summit and the base of Puy de Dôme remains incomplete. It would be the only monumental structure in this settlement, but this is common in towns throughout the Massif Central region.

The presence of terra nigra indicates that the site was occupied during the latter half of the 1st century BC, although it is more probable that it was occupied during the 1st century AD. The final elements are dated to the latter half of the 2nd century and the early/mid-3rd century. The site was abandoned during the early second half of the 3rd century, and the retaining walls eventually collapsed.

=== Lower quarter ===
The western sector, also designated as the lower quarter, is approximately 400 meters from Col de Ceyssat proper, at a lower elevation, ranging from 1,010 to 1,020 meters. The interest in this sector is motivated by the presence of an alignment of stones on the surface, to the west along departmental road 68, which are interpreted as the umbones of the Agrippa road. In 2003, 35 of these stones were observed on one side and 9 on the other, with an average distance of 6.50 meters between each stone.

In this sector, some topographical anomalies indicate the potential presence of multiple remains in the vicinity and along a route that connected the commune of Ceyssat to Clermont-Ferrand. This route has previously been interpreted as the Agrippa road. At least three quadrangular anomalies, which were identified as constructions during surveys, yielded ancient artifacts. One of these constructions, which was initially sounded in 2021 and then again in 2022, is interpreted as a potential stable. This interpretation is supported by the discovery of a trough and the confirmation of the presence of horses through biomolecular analyses.

Of particular interest is a rectangular structure, measuring approximately 19 x 10 meters, situated close to the pathway. This structure was the subject of clandestine excavation, yielding a range of artifacts, including mosaic tesserae and metal slag. The transect, which was opened in 2003 and runs across the path and the southern part of the large building, demonstrates a robust correlation between these two entities, which have undergone disparate phases. The building, constructed in the early 1st century, has been interpreted as an inn. It predates the road, which was built at the earliest during the first half of the 1st century on the site of a La Tène or Augustan ditch. As with the ditch that preceded it, the Roman road was subject to considerable runoff resulting from the topography, necessitating the construction of bordering ditches. The southern wall of the rectangular building was leveled before the second half of the 2nd century, and replaced in the latter half of the same century by another, wider wall, while the road was resurfaced. It seems that the runoff issues, which prompted the construction of a substantial bordering ditch adjacent to the structure, led to a transformation in the building's function, with the floor being elevated. The presence of a mosaic tessera indicates the existence of a high-quality construction, which may correspond to a place of worship associated with the road. The bordering ditch ceased to function at the earliest in the first third of the 2nd century, and the southern wall of the building collapsed and was subsequently abandoned in the second half of the 2nd century or during the 3rd century. The duration of the road's continued functionality remains uncertain.

The presence of the lower quarter may be attributed to the narrowness of the pass, which could not accommodate all the facilities. Its lower altitude and, consequently, reduced susceptibility to inclement weather, particularly during the winter months, may also have been a contributing factor. Alternatively, the existence of a bypass before entering the hollow way and ascending to the pass, with all that it implies in terms of personnel and structures for accommodating men and mounts, may have been a significant influence.

=== Funerary zone ===
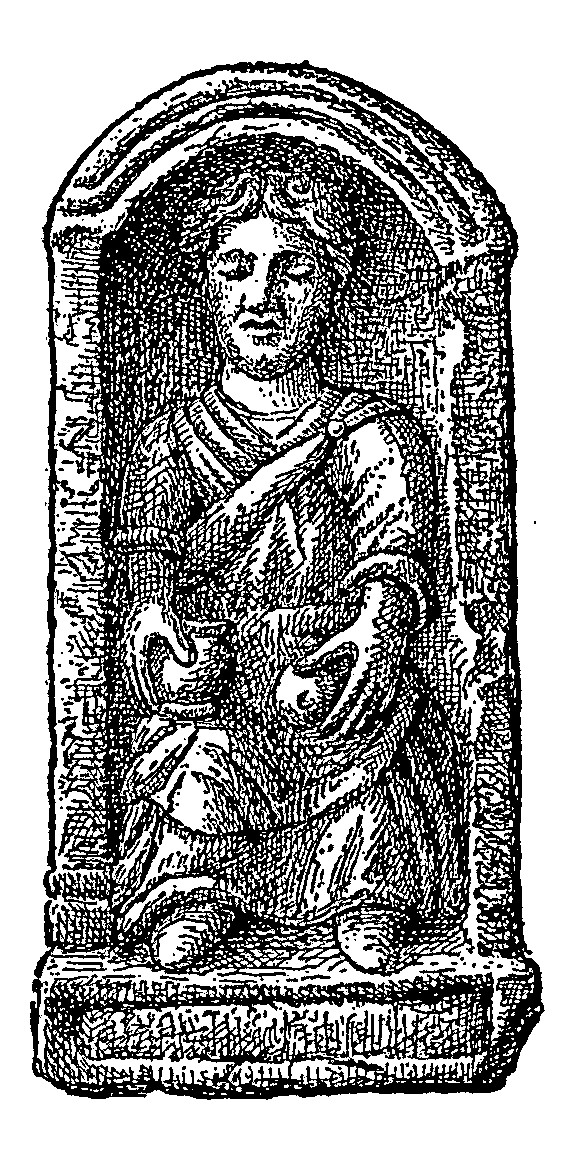
Stele discovered on the Col de Ceyssat during the winter of 1886–1887.

A funerary zone, extending for a minimum of 250 meters in a north–south direction, is situated to the south of the settlement. A hypothetical road with a generally north–south axis would have served this area. However, the boundaries of the funerary zone remain unknown due to its location on the eastern slope of Puy des Grosmanaux, where the steep incline presents a significant challenge for pedestrian surveys. The available literature reports some ancient discoveries, including a stele (Note: The stele is preserved in the National Archaeology Museum (Provost & Mennessier-Jouannet 1994, p. 302).) depicting a female figure in a small niche measuring 45 × 30 × 25 cm and weighing 19 kg, which was unearthed during the winter of 1886–1887. This could represent a mother goddess or, more likely, a votive stele, although no inscription was engraved in the designated cartouche. In addition, three funerary chests were discovered in the same area during the 1990s.

In February 2002, a funerary pyre, previously interpreted as a favissa, was probed approximately 250 meters south of the pass. Despite the disruption to the stratigraphy of the structure caused by clandestine excavations carried out in 1992 and 1995, the excavation successfully uncovered a pyre-oriented northwest–southeast. The dimensions of the pyre were 4.80 × 3.80 meters at the opening and at least 2 × 2.50 meters at its base, with a depth of 1.80 meters. The dimensions of the funerary pyre at Col de Ceyssat are among the largest known from the Gaul and Roman worlds. The data collected provide evidence of a significant cremation, with a cremation layer exceeding 10 cubic meters, and the presence of residues outside the pyre's perimeter. The edge of the pyre is marked by trachyte blocks, while the ashes are sealed by a layer of blocks, which may indicate the presence of a tumulus. In addition to the charred bones, the artifacts collected include more than 500 vases, some of which were shattered by the heat of the pyre, which exceeded 800 °C. Also found were fragments of animal bones, vegetable offerings, glass, tokens, a fibula, coins, and numerous nails that must have been used for the pyre as well as for securing the ceramics. The identity of the individual cremated on this pyre, dated to the 2nd century, is currently unknown. However, the ostentatious nature of the cremation suggests that the deceased was likely a member of the local elite, potentially a priest of the cult of Mercury. The precise location of the tomb, which may not be within the pyre pit, remains uncertain, partly due to damage caused by clandestine excavations.

At the periphery of the cult zone and the road station, situated between two edifices erected between the late 1950s and early 1960s, is the sole structure in this vicinity that lacks a funerary function. Excavated in 1957, the structure is a modest rectangular edifice, measuring 2.75 meters in length and 3.50 meters in width. Its walls are constructed using reticulated masonry techniques and are partitioned into two sections by a rudimentary partition wall. The presence of hypocaust pipes was also discerned during the excavation process.

=== Synthesis ===
The knowledge of the settlement at Col de Ceyssat is based on the pooling of results from ancient discoveries, sporadic survey operations distributed across the entire archaeological site, and pedestrian surveys conducted in wooded areas. The archaeological record is primarily documented through scheduled operations carried out in different sectors of the ancient settlement. In the case of the northern zone, the study of ceramic artifacts alone suggests the existence of a cult zone, an interpretation supported by ancient discoveries and recent surveys.

All the operations serve to confirm the chronology of occupation, from a glimpsed but certain La Tène presence to an unexplained abandonment of the site after the mid-3rd century. It can be stated with certainty that the settlement was polycentric, particularly regarding the relationship between the area of the pass proper and the lower quarter. The absence of remains between these two zones lends support to the hypothesis that the settlement was "scattered along communication routes." The estimated area of the settlement ranges between more than 10 hectares, 12 hectares, and at least 15 hectares.

While specific areas have been identified, including a road station, a cult zone, and a funerary zone, numerous questions remain unanswered, such as the organization of internal roadways. The metal artifacts unearthed in the early 2000s are more indicative of production and subsistence activities than domestic ones. However, they confirm the characterization of a grouped settlement at Col de Ceyssat. The discovery of a considerable number of millstones in a concentrated area may indicate the presence of a bakery, although this hypothesis remains unconfirmed by the excavations. A trachyte quarry located in the Kilian crater, situated to the southwest of the settlement, has been occasionally associated with the settlement at Col de Ceyssat. However, no evidence of quarrying activities dating to the Roman era has been identified at this site.

The issue of water management plays a pivotal role in this settlement, which was constructed on terraces. Apart from the formidable border ditch that was unearthed in the lower section, no evidence of rainwater drainage systems or cisterns has been uncovered. While the possibility of a water supply originating from sources situated a few kilometers away has been contemplated, the discovery of a considerable number of jugs and kettles during the surveys of the cult area indicates that rainwater was purified in these containers before any domestic or cult-related usage.

== Identification and characterization ==
=== Rediscovery of a settlement ===
As early as the nineteenth century, the hypothesis of the presence of a small town was considered. In this regard, Jean-Baptiste Bouillet regarded it as a "Roman villa or one of those military posts called mansio, statio, mutatio, which the Romans placed along roads," while Baron La Force referred to it as a "fortress" or even a "village," and Louis De Laigue as a "small inhabited center." In the initial stages of his investigation, Pierre-Pardoux Mathieu postulated that the site might be a "fortress, a military post." He subsequently proposed that it could be identified as a "residence." In 1875, Mathieu concluded his analysis of Col de Ceyssat, posing the question, "Was it a stop for the traveler, or a halt for the pilgrim who climbed higher?" At the beginning of the following century, Auguste Audollent offered a more precise indication:

It is not only at the summit of the puy but also on its slopes (Redon, Col de Ceyssat), at its base (La Tourette d'Enval), that important archaeological remains have been found. These are undoubtedly mostly inns (mansiones) for travelers or pilgrims. But in this whole, more than one object directly relates to Mercury (statuettes and inscriptions). So, one is authorized to believe that alongside the upper temple, this god also had a lower temple, perhaps for those of his devotees whom the ascent of the mountain would have frightened.

— Auguste Audollent, "Letter to Mr. Kurth on the Temple of Puy de Dôme," October 31, 1907

Following a period of relative obscurity during the 20th century, the various remnants failed to capture the attention of Francis Tassaux when he compiled the list of secondary settlements in Roman Aquitaine in 1994. Similarly, the authors of the Carte archéologique du Puy-de-Dôme did not categorize Col de Ceyssat as a settlement and distributed the ancient discoveries with a high degree of precision at the tripoint of the communes of Ceyssat, Saint-Genès-Champanelle, and Orcines.

In the course of a master's thesis that concentrated on the commune of Ceyssat, it was feasible to situate the ancient discoveries within a broader context, while nevertheless treating them as discrete sites. It was only as a result of the storm of 1999 and the implementation of preemptive excavation operations that the possibility of "considering the hypothesis of a secondary settlement linked to the temple of Mercury" could be explored.

In addition to the prospecting and preventive excavation operations conducted at the turn of the 2000s, the surveys conducted by Frédéric Trément corroborated the archaeological characterization of the site as a secondary settlement and provided archaeological documentation, diverging from the bibliographical and literary analyses of the 19th century. By this designation of a secondary settlement, French archaeologists of the late 20th and early 21st centuries have defined such settlements as those situated between the capital of a city and the dispersed habitat represented by rural establishments.

In the mid-2000s, an updated assessment of secondary settlements in Auvergne still classified Col de Ceyssat among the "sites likely to correspond to settlements," though the available documentation was deemed incomplete. Following this presentation, a discussion allowed Frédéric Trément to reaffirm the density of the remains and their interpretation.

This interpretation is corroborated by a study on secondary Roman settlements in the Massif Central, which identifies Col de Ceyssat as a definitively established settlement. Rediscovered at the turn of the 2000s, this secondary settlement had already been interpreted as a grouped habitat as early as the 19th century, although not based on archaeological remains.

=== Ubrilium of the Peutinger Table? ===
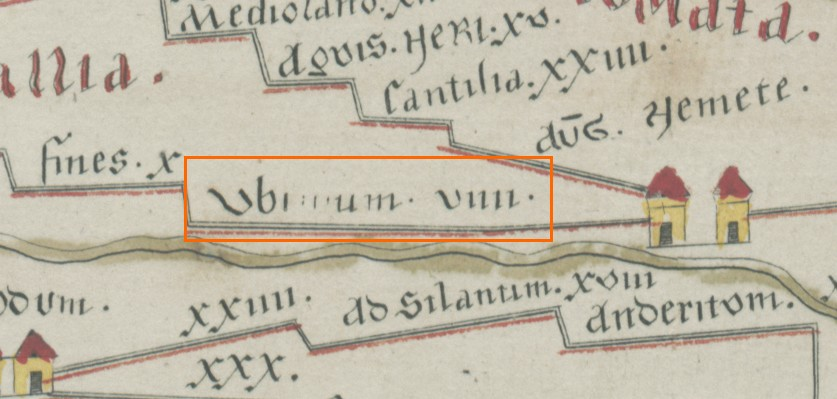
Location of the Ubrilium station on the Peutinger table.

The proposed location of the Ubrilium station was once Col de Ceyssat. Under the hypothesis proposed by Jean-Baptiste Bourguignon d'Anville, Pierre-François Fournier identified the location with the town of Olby. However, an examination of the toponymy and the distance separating the settlement from Augustonemetum revealed inconsistencies that cast doubt on this identification. In contrast, Pierre Denimal proposed associating the station with the village of Mazaye. Frédéric Trément advanced the hypothesis that the settlement at Col de Ceyssat should be identified with Ubrilium, whose distance from Augustonemetum corresponds exactly to what is indicated on the Peutinger Table (equivalent to 13 km). However, this hypothesis was subsequently abandoned in favor of Mazaye, located in the vicinity of the Fung Pond.

=== A sanctuary at the foot of the temple of Mercury ===
The possibility of a cultic area at the base of Puy de Dôme was first posited at the end of the 19th century by De Laigue, who proposed the theory of a sacellum in the wake of the discovery of a funerary stele. This stele was linked to the sanctuary of La Tourette:

A votive inscription suggests that, aside from the monumental temple erected at the summit of Puy de Dôme, there might have been a more or less significant sacellum near the southern base of this mountain and at the entrance to the Ceyssat pass.

There are numerous associations between the summit sanctuary and the constructions discovered at La Tourette, particularly concerning the presence of priests devoted to the cult of Mercury Dumias. Pierre-Pardoux Mathieu, who was the first to establish a link between the remains at the pass and the proximity to the Temple of Mercury, wrote:

It was at the foot of the Wasson, (Note: From 1872 onward, the Mercury sanctuary on Puy de Dôme has been associated with the Vasso Galate described by Gregory of Tours (History of the Franks, I, 32). However, the assimilation was refuted by Pierre-François Fournier as early as 1936 and then in 1947 (Fournier, Pierre-François (1947). "Les fouilles de l'École Nestor-Perret à Clermont-Ferrand". Comptes rendus des séances de l'Académie des Inscriptions et Belles-Lettres (in French). 91 (3): 496–501. Archived from the original on 19 August 2024.) and several times since, in favor of the sanctuary discovered west of Jaude Square (Fournier, Pierre-François (1965). "Le monument dit Vasso de Jaude à Clermont-Ferrand". Gallia (in French). 23 (1): 103–150. doi:10.3406/galia.1965.2221. ISSN 0016-4119. Archived from the original on 19 August 2024.). The most recent studies dedicated to the sanctuaries go in the same direction (Mitton, Claire (2010). "Les grands sanctuaires des cités arverne et vellave : un bilan contrasté". La Praxis municipale dans l'Occident romain (in French). pp. 471–478.).) a thriving town under the influence of Roman civilization, which must have been, during the winters, the residence of ministers attached to the sanctuary.

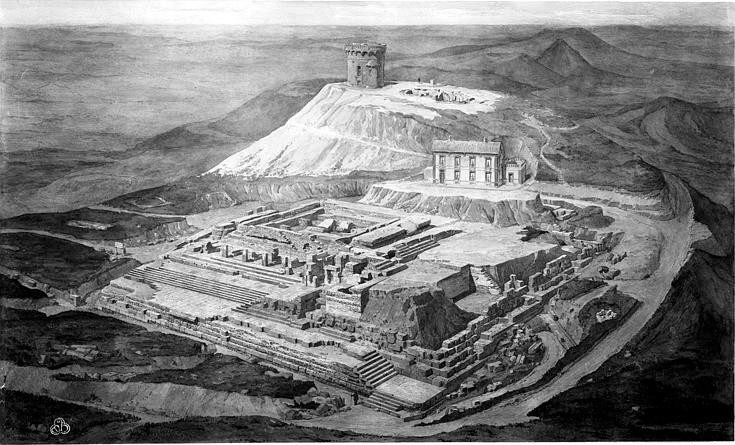
Puy de Dôme excavations with the observatory in the background (watercolor by Louis-Clémentin Bruyerre, 1876).

In a subsequent publication, Auguste Audollent articulated a more nuanced perspective on the constructions at the Ceyssat pass, suggesting that they were intended to provide accommodation for travelers and pilgrims. He also offered a detailed analysis of the sanctuary of La Tourette:

Those who were afraid of the ascent, due to their age or frail health, could, it seems, satisfy their piety without exposing themselves to such fatigue. At the Ceyssat pass and on the western flank of the Puy, at a place called 'Redon,' where the automobile road intersects the path with its sixteen bends, archaeological remains have been unearthed. If these are likely shelters or inns for travelers and pilgrims, one might not say the same for La Tourette d'Enval, in the territory of Montrodeix, on the southern plateau, where inscriptions and statuettes of Mercury have been unearthed. There might have been a sanctuary more accessible to the infirm than that at the summit. But most devotees would have insisted on bringing their homage and prayers to the god on the Dôme itself, and hanging their ex-votos on the walls and vaults of his temple.

The sanctuary of the Ceyssat Pass settlement is a potential residence for the priests of the cult of Mercury and is a necessary passageway to access Puy de Dôme. Marc Migeon posits that the summit sanctuary represents the culmination of a series of sanctuaries that have been identified along a path extending from the Ceyssat pass, through the Laschamps plain, and culminating at the summit of Puy-de-Dôme. This notable interconnection between the road station and the cultic areas, extending from the summit of Puy de Dôme and the northern portion of the Ceyssat pass settlement, prompted Jérôme Trescarte to draw a playful comparison between the Mercury sanctuary and the sanctuary of Lourdes. He observed that in Lourdes, numerous accommodations, restaurants, and shops selling souvenirs and religious items have become so prominent that it has effectively overshadowed the Marian sanctuary itself.

=== Ceyssat, a settlement in a network ===
Florian Baret's doctoral research on secondary agglomerations in the Massif Central permitted the repositioning of the Ceyssat pass settlement in a broader regional context. This was achieved through a critical review of the archaeological documentation associated with each case. Of the 147 sites studied, 93 were classified as hypothetical and confirmed agglomerations. Of these, 56 are situated within the territory of the Arverni city.

From this series, several key insights can be derived. The settlement is situated within a marginal range of sites in terms of its altitudinal placement. It belongs to a class that represents only 5.05% of settlements, with an altitude between 1000 and 1200 meters, while the average altitude is 506 meters. The city's polynuclear organization is not a singular phenomenon; other sites within the Arverni city, including Blot-l'Église, Usson-en-Forez, and Lezoux, provide evidence to this effect. However, on the scale of the Massif Central, it is the sole secondary settlement situated at the summit of a pass. This polynuclearity, situated in proximity to the east–west axis of the Agrippa road and a route leading to the summit of Puy de Dôme, renders it a road junction analogous to that observed at Voingt. Additionally, the peripheral placement of a cultic area is a notable feature, as evidenced by the archaeological site of the Croix de la Pierre in Charbonnier-les-Mines.

== Bibliography ==
=== Printed sources ===
- Baret, Florian (2015). Les agglomérations « secondaires » gallo-romaines dans le Massif Central (cités des Arvernes, Vellaves, Gabales, Rutènes, Cadurques et Lémovices) : Ier siècle avant J.-C. – Ve siècle après J.-C (PhD thesis) (in French). Clermont-Ferrand: Blaise-Pascal University.
- Baret, Florian (2016). "Le réseau des agglomérations antiques dans les cités du Massif central (Arvernes, Vellaves, Gabales, Rutènes, Cadurques et Lémovices) entre le Ier s. av. J.-C. et le Ve s. ap. J.-C". Gallia (in French). 73–2: 169–212. doi:10.4000/gallia.2732. ISSN 0016-4119. Archived from the original on 9 February 2022.
- Baret, Florian (2022). Origines de la ville dans le Massif Central. Les agglomérations antiques. Villes et Territoires (in French). Tours: Presses Universitaires François-Rabelais. ISBN 978-2-86906-804-9.
- Mathieu, Pierre-Pardoux (1875). "Le puy de Dôme, ses ruines, Mercure et les matrones". Mémoires de l'Académie des Sciences, Belles-Lettres et Arts de Clermont-Ferrand (in French). XVII: 227–440. Archived from the original on 19 August 2024.
- Migeon, Marc (2020). Le culte de Mercure en Narbonnaise, dans les Trois Gaules et en Germanies. Approche épigraphique, Ier siècle : IVe siècle après J.-C. Monographies Instrumentum (in French). Vol. 69. Drémil-Lafarge: Mergoil. ISBN 978-2-35518-108-5.
- Mitton, Claire (2007). "Les sanctuaires arvernes et vellaves hors des chefs-lieux de cités du Ier s. av. J.-C. au IVe s. ap. J.-C. : approche typologique et spatiale". Revue archéologique du Centre de la France (in French). 45–46. ISSN 1951-6207. Archived from the original on 7 June 2020.
- Paillet, Jean-Louis; Tardy, Dominique (2012). "Le sanctuaire de Mercure au sommet du puy de Dôme : le cadre architectural d'un circuit processionnel". Étudier les lieux de culte de Gaule romaine. Archéologie et histoire romaine (in French). Vol. 24. Montagnac: Monique Mergoil. pp. 197–207. ISBN 978-2-35518-029-3.
- Provost, Michel; Mennessier-Jouannet, Christine (1994). Le Puy-de-Dôme. Carte archéologique de la Gaule (in French). Vol. 63/2. Paris: Académie des inscriptions et belles-lettres. ISBN 978-2-87754-031-5.
- Rémy, Bernard (1996). Inscriptions latines d'Aquitaine. Arvernes (in French). Bordeaux: De Boccard. ISBN 978-2-910023-05-8. Archived from the original on 29 November 1998.
- Lemée, Georges; Carbiener, Roland (1956). "La végétation et les sols des volcans de la chaîne des Puys". Bulletin de la Société Botanique de France (in French). 103 (2): 7–29 [25–26]. doi:10.1080/00378941.1956.10835059. ISSN 0037-8941. Archived from the original on 19 August 2024.
- Trément, Frédéric (2004). De la Gaule méditerranéenne à la Gaule centrale. Paysages et peuplements à l' ge du Fer et à l'époque romaine. Archéologie et paléoenvironnement des campagnes de Provence et d'Auvergne (Thesis) (in French). Aix-en-Provence: Université de Provence. Archived from the original on 19 August 2024.
- Trément, Frédéric (2000). "Le programme "Histoire de l'occupation du sol et évolution des paysages dans le bassin de Clermont-Ferrand". Archéologie spatiale et archéologie du paysage". Revue d'Auvergne (in French). 114 (554/555 « Nouvelles archéologiques. Du terrain au laboratoire… »): 111–127. ISSN 1159-7151. Archived from the original on 19 August 2024.
- Trément, Frédéric (2002). "La cité arverne à l'époque romaine". L'identité de l'Auvergne (in French). Nonette: Créer. pp. 194–217. ISBN 2-909797-70-8. Archived from the original on 19 August 2024.
- Trément, Frédéric, ed. (2013). Les Arvernes et leurs voisins du Massif Central à l'époque romaine. Une archéologie du développement des territoires. Revue d'Auvergne (in French). Vol. 2. Clermont-Ferrand: Alliance Universitaire d'Auvergne. ISSN 1269-8946.
  - Dacko, Marion. "Le réseau routier antique dans les territoires arverne et vellave". In Trément (2013), pp. 105–125.
  - Ducreux, Aurélie. "La consommation de mobilier métallique dans les établissements urbains et ruraux de la cité arverne et de ses marges septentrionales à l'époque romaine". In Trément (2013), pp. 261–276.
  - Trément, Frédéric (2013b). "Une agglomération routière et cultuelle au col de Ceyssat (Puy-de-Dôme)". In Trément (2013), pp. 71–89.
- Trément, Frédéric (2021a). "Au-dessous du volcan. Les hospitalia du temple de Mercure au scanner du lidar". Dossiers d'Archéologie (in French) (406): 44–49. ISSN 1141-7137. Archived from the original on 19 August 2024.
- Trément, Frédéric; Humbert, Lucile (2004). "Une incinération spectaculaire au pied du puy de Dôme. Le bûcher funéraire du col de Ceyssat (Saint-Genès-Champanelle)". Autocélébration des élites locales dans le monde romain : contextes, images, textes, IIe s. av. J.-C.-IIIe s. ap. J.-C. Erga (in French). Vol. 7. Clermont-Ferrand: Presses Universitaires Blaise Pascal. pp. 463–500. ISBN 2-84516-271-5. Archived from the original on 19 August 2024.
- Trescarte, Jérôme (2007). "Céramiques communes en contexte cultuel : le cas du puy de Dôme, sanctuaire sommital et agglomération du col de Ceyssat (Puy-de-Dôme)". Actes du congrès de Langres. 17–20 mai 2007 (in French). Marseille: Société française d'étude de la céramique antique en Gaule. pp. 367–394.

=== Operations summaries ===
- Arnaud, Philippe (2005). "Orcines/Ceyssat. Col de Ceyssat – base du puy de Dôme". Bilan scientifique de la région Auvergne 2003 (in French). Clermont-Ferrand: SRA Auvergne. pp. 98–99.
- Bet, Philippe (2002). "Orcines. Chemin d'accès au puy de Dôme". Bilan scientifique de la région Auvergne 2000 (in French). Clermont-Ferrand: SRA Auvergne. p. 130.
- Humbert, Lucile (2002a). "Prospection inventaire. Ceyssat, Orcines et Saint-Genès-Champanelle". Bilan scientifique de la région Auvergne 2000 (in French). Clermont-Ferrand: SRA Auvergne. pp. 50–51.
- Humbert, Lucile (2002b). "Orcines. Chemin d'accès au puy de Dôme". Bilan scientifique de la région Auvergne 2000 (in French). Clermont-Ferrand: SRA Auvergne. pp. 130–131.
- Mortagne de Sury, Brigitte (2001). "Ceyssat/Orcines. Col de Ceyssat". Bilan scientifique de la région Auvergne 1999 (in French). Clermont-Ferrand: SRA Auvergne. pp. 87–88.
- Trément, Frédéric (2002b). "Sondage, Ceyssat. Col de Ceyssat". Bilan scientifique de la région Auvergne 2000 (in French). Clermont-Ferrand: SRA Auvergne. pp. 135–136.
- Trément, Frédéric (2002c). "Sondage, Saint-Genès-Champanelle. Col de Ceyssat – Bois de Manson". Bilan scientifique de la région Auvergne 2000 (in French). Clermont-Ferrand: SRA Auvergne. pp. 142–143. Archived from the original on 19 August 2024.
- Trément, Frédéric (2002d). "Prospection-thématique et sondage, Ceyssat – Saint-Genès-Champanelle – Orcines. Col de Ceyssat". Bilan scientifique de la région Auvergne 2001 (in French). Clermont-Ferrand: SRA Auvergne. pp. 118–120. Archived from the original on 19 August 2024.
- Trément, Frédéric (2004a). "Orcines. Col de Ceyssat". Bilan scientifique de la région Auvergne 2002 (in French). Clermont-Ferrand: SRA Auvergne. p. 106. Archived from the original on 19 August 2024.
- Trément, Frédéric (2005). "Sondage, Ceyssat. Col de Ceyssat". Bilan scientifique de la région Auvergne 2003 (in French). Clermont-Ferrand: SRA Auvergne. pp. 108–111. Archived from the original on 19 August 2024.
- Trément, Frédéric (2021b). "Ceyssat, Orcines, Saint-Genès-Champanelle – L'agglomération antique du col de Ceyssat". Archéologie de la France – Informations (in French). ISSN 2114-0502. Archived from the original on 10 November 2023.
- Trément, Frédéric (2022). "Ceyssat – L'agglomération antique du col de Ceyssat. Prospection thématique (2021)". Archéologie de la France – Informations (in French). ISSN 2114-0502. Archived from the original on 10 November 2023.
- Vernet, Gérard; Vernet, Brigitte (2001). "Ceyssat/Orcines. Col de Ceyssat". Bilan scientifique de la région Auvergne 1999 (in French). Clermont-Ferrand: SRA Auvergne. pp. 88–89.

=== Grey literature ===
- Trément, Frédéric (2003). L'agglomération antique du col de Ceyssat (Ceyssat, Orcines, Saint-Genès-Champanelle). Contribution à l'étude du contexte archéologique du temple de Mercure (Puy-de-Dôme) (in French). Clermont-Ferrand: Centre de recherches sur les civilisations antiques.
