= Temple of Mercury (Puy de Dôme) =

Romano-Celtic temple

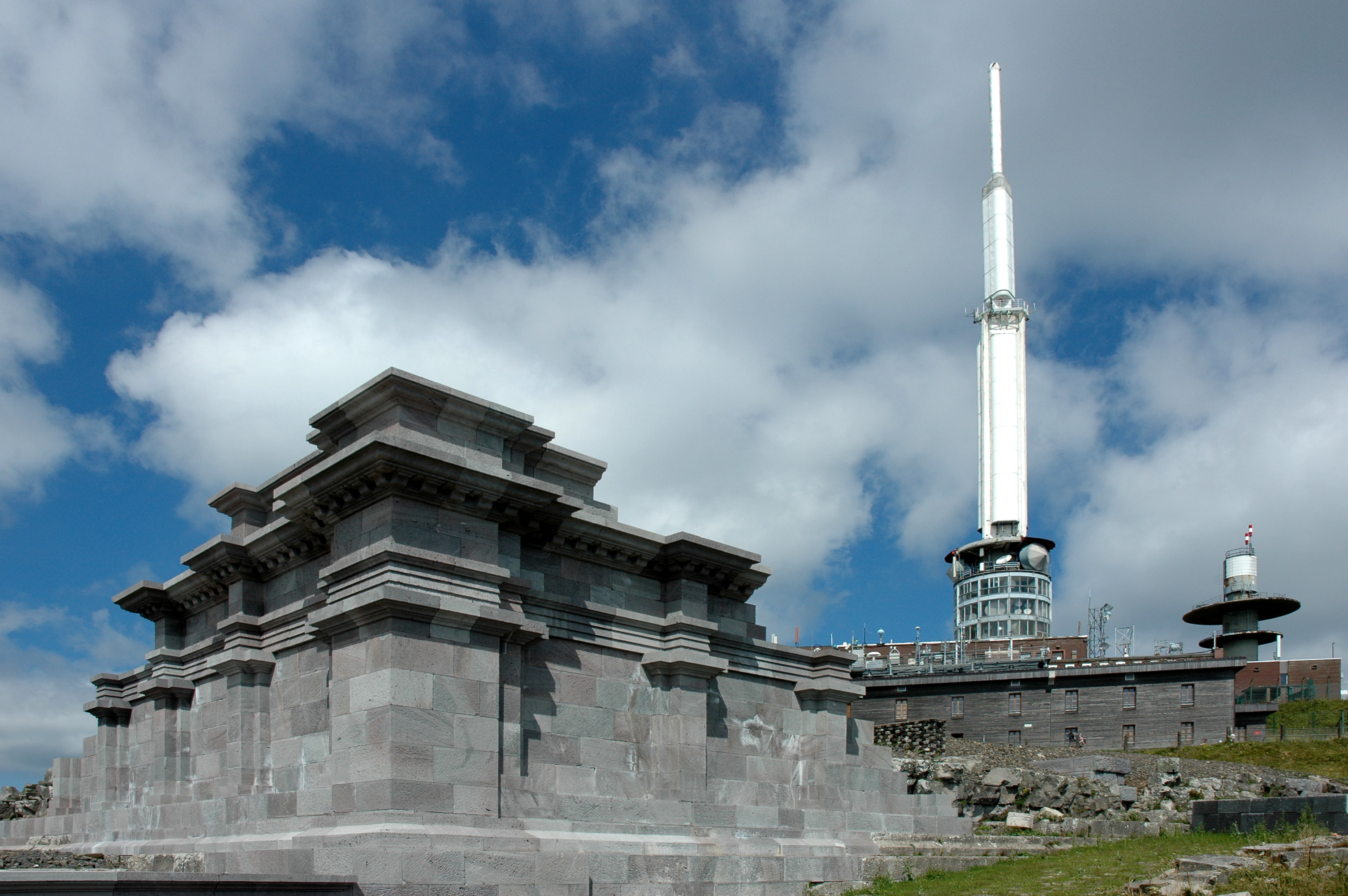
- The Temple of Mercury ruins in 2015, after partial restoration

- Location within France
- 45°46′18″N 2°57′52″E
- Type: Romano-Celtic Temple
- Periods: Classical Antiquity
- Cultures: Arverni, Gallo-Roman
- Location: Puy de Dôme, Auvergne, France
- Region: Auvergne

History
- Built: 2nd century CE
- Abandoned: 4th century CE

Site notes
- Material: Trachyte
- Elevation: 1,435 m (4,708 ft)
- Excavation dates: 1873 - 1878, 1900s, 2000 - 2004
- Condition: Ruined
- Owner: Département

Monument historique
- Designated: 1889

The Temple of Mercury at Puy de Dôme is a Gallo-Roman trachyte temple built in the 2nd century at the summit of the lava dome. It replaced a 1st-century arkose temple on the same site, which was apparently too small to accommodate the many pilgrims who visited. Its remains were revealed by excavation campaigns in 1875 and at the turn of the century.

== Archaeology ==
=== Initial discovery and research ===
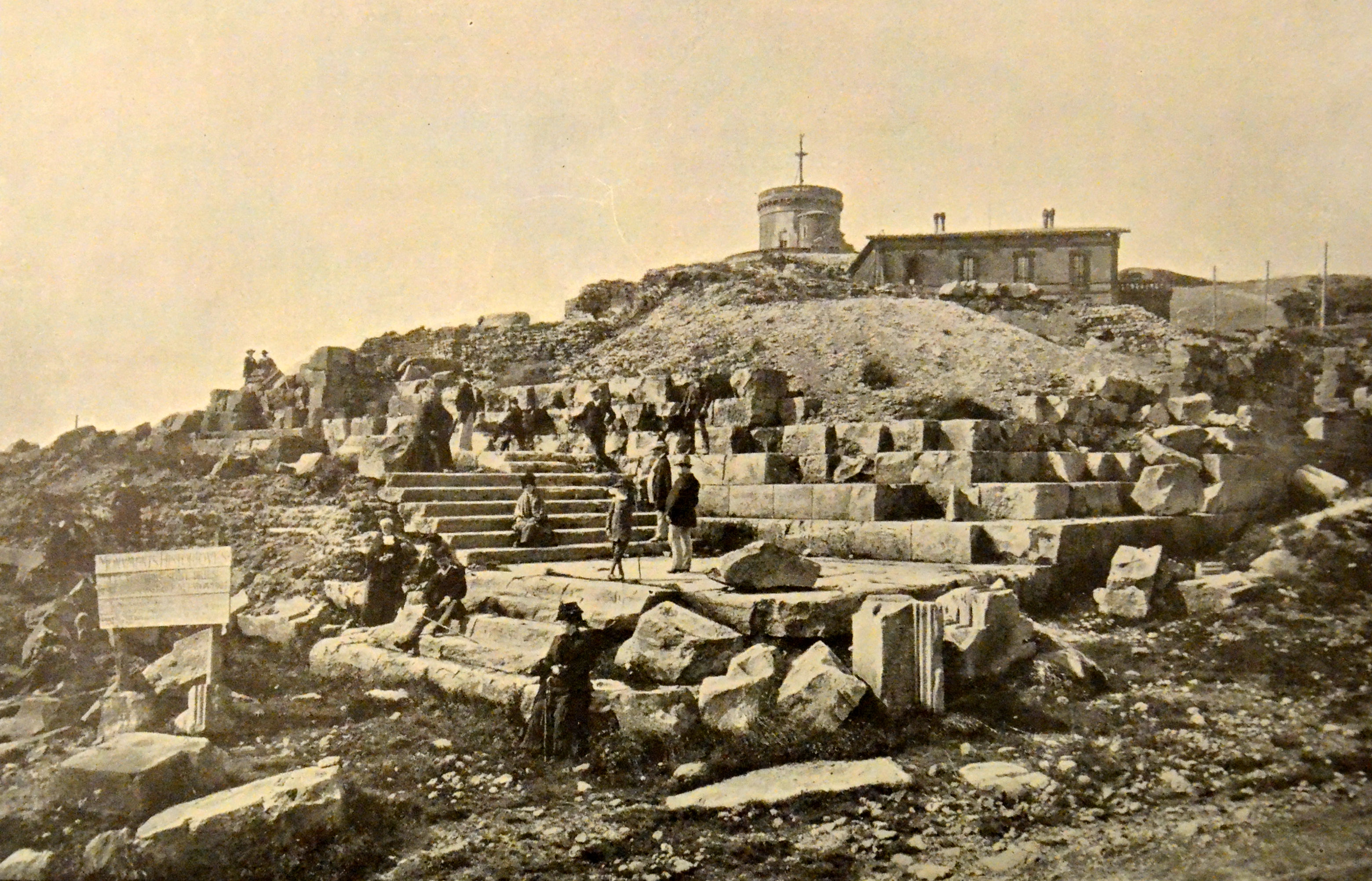
The temple and observatory, around 1900

The site was discovered in 1872 during the construction of a meteorological observatory. Very quickly, the first excavations took place between 1873 and 1878, conducted by The Academy of Sciences of Clermont-Ferrand, under Louis-Clémentin Bruyère's direction in 1875. This initial research made it possible to conceive of the first site plans.

The excavations were then stopped and the temple abandoned in that state. It was not until 1886 that steps were taken to protect it. It was classified as a historic monument in 1889.

A number of later discoveries led to a second series of excavations, under the direction of Auguste Audollent and Gabriel Ruprich-Robert. This series of campaigns particularly studied the surroundings of the site and discovered a small annex temple as well as a small statuette of Mercury beside it, further confirming the dedication of the place of worship.

=== Modern excavations ===
In 1956, the installation of a microwave relay located at the top of the dome, above the current temple, took place without preliminary excavations. The workers discovered scattered coins.

Deterioration due to bad weather led to some consolidation and repair work, including a major restoration in 1978.

Excavations did not resume intensively and regularly until 2000. These campaigns, carried out from 2000 to 2004 under the direction of Dominique Tardy and Jean-Louis Paillet, made it possible to complete a precise architectural survey, and modern excavation techniques have enabled significant advancements of knowledge about the site. The contributions of these campaigns were supplemented by the archaeological diagnosis carried out in 2008 prior to the tourist development of the site and its restoration.

=== Restoration ===
A partial restoration project of the lower parts of the sanctuary was conceived in 2008 by the state and département. It was carried out in two phases, the first of which lasted until 2014 and involved the reconstruction of a part of a terrace supported by the surrounding wall. The second phase will include clearing the site's view of obstructions caused by materials left behind from 19th-century excavations. The purpose of the restoration was stated to be the preservation of the ruins, which are subject to harsh climatic conditions, as well as imparting a better appreciation for the scale and appearance of the temple in its original state.

==== Controversy ====
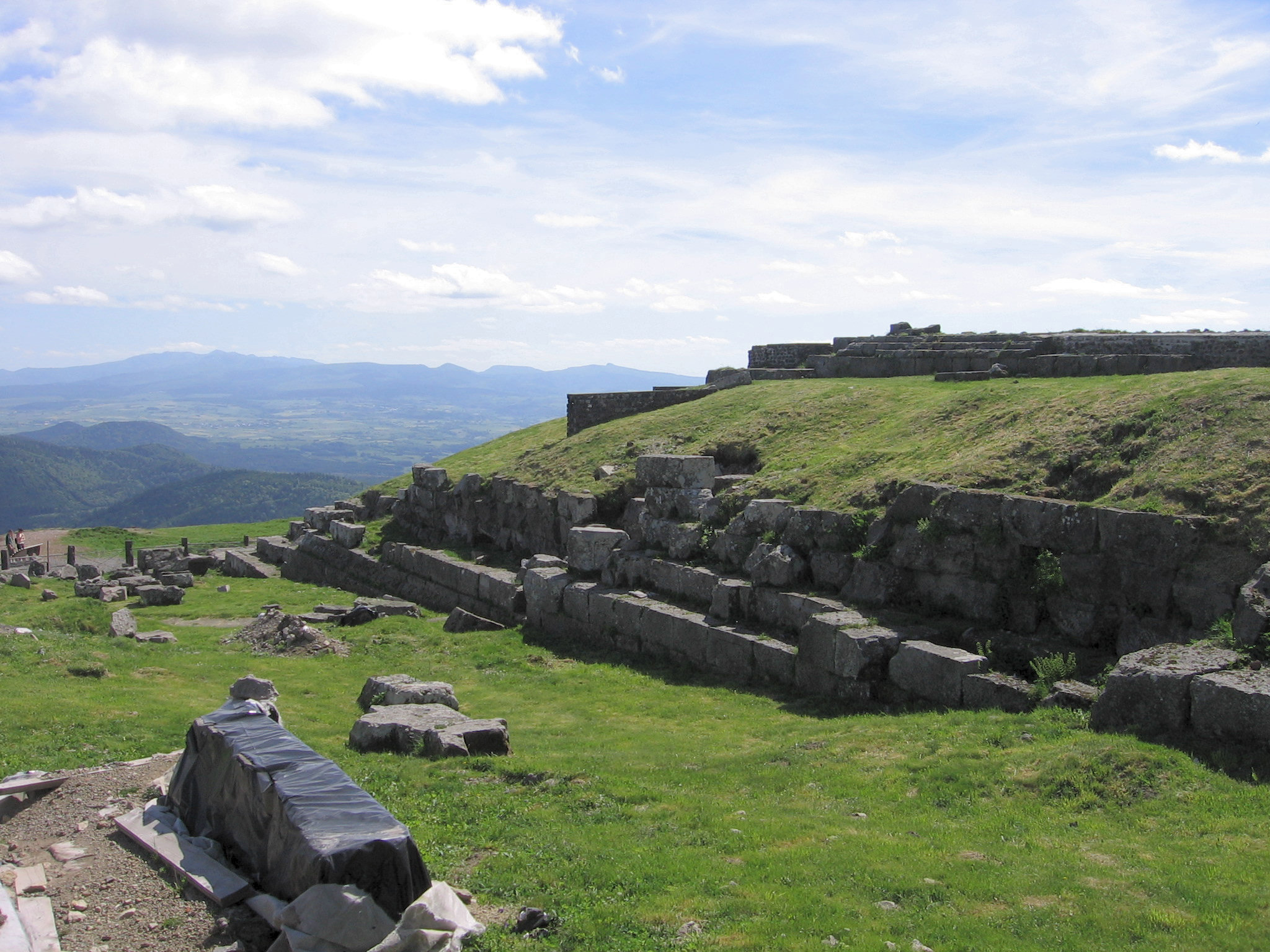
View of the ruins in 2005, prior to restoration

Some critics have denounced the restoration project for concealing the original ruins. Frédéric Trément, who excavated the site between 1999 and 2003, stated prior to the restoration that he was not consulted for the project and that, "the proposed reconstruction has the paradoxical consequence of making these ruins invisible behind an imposing and hideous Berlin Wall." Dominique Tardy similarly disapproved of the project:

Neither the reading of the site, from the vestiges alone, remains very obscure, nor the preservation of the authentic masonry - at least what remained of it - finds favor in this massive reconstruction, which also touches on the archaeological state of dismantling the edifice with particular regard to its southeast corner. We wanted to do this so that visitors understand better, but whether we go above or below, we no longer see the processional system; the result: people will certainly not understand more.

== Temple ==
=== Chronology ===
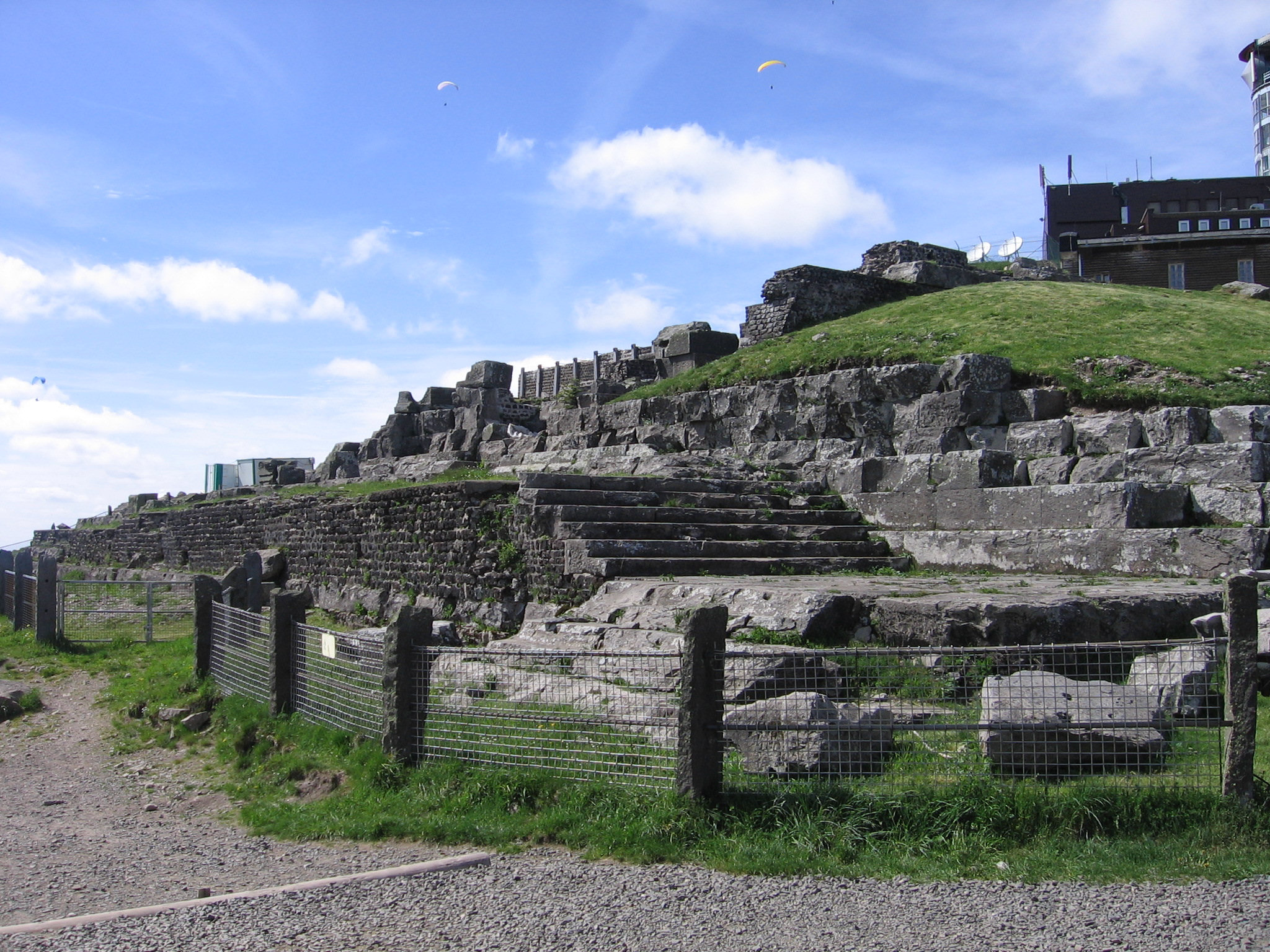
Temple of Mercury - access to the first terrace (prior to restoration project)

A first temple was built around 50 CE on the summit of Puy de Dôme. Although objects dating from prior to the Roman conquest have been discovered, no trace of a pre-Roman building has been found. As such, the site may have been the subject of only temporary visitation without permanent construction.

The 1st-century temple was destroyed around 150 CE and part of its materials used to build the second temple, lower on the slope, at an altitude around 1,435 meters. It is this temple which we can still see the remains of today.

Coins discovered at the site indicates that it was still in use in the 4th and 5th centuries, but the structure could have been ruined by this time, perhaps by the 3rd century, at the same time as the neighboring agglomeration of the Ceyssat Pass from which the path leads to the place of worship.

In the 12th century, a Romanesque church, built on the summit of the dome, was inhabited by a hermit.

=== Description ===
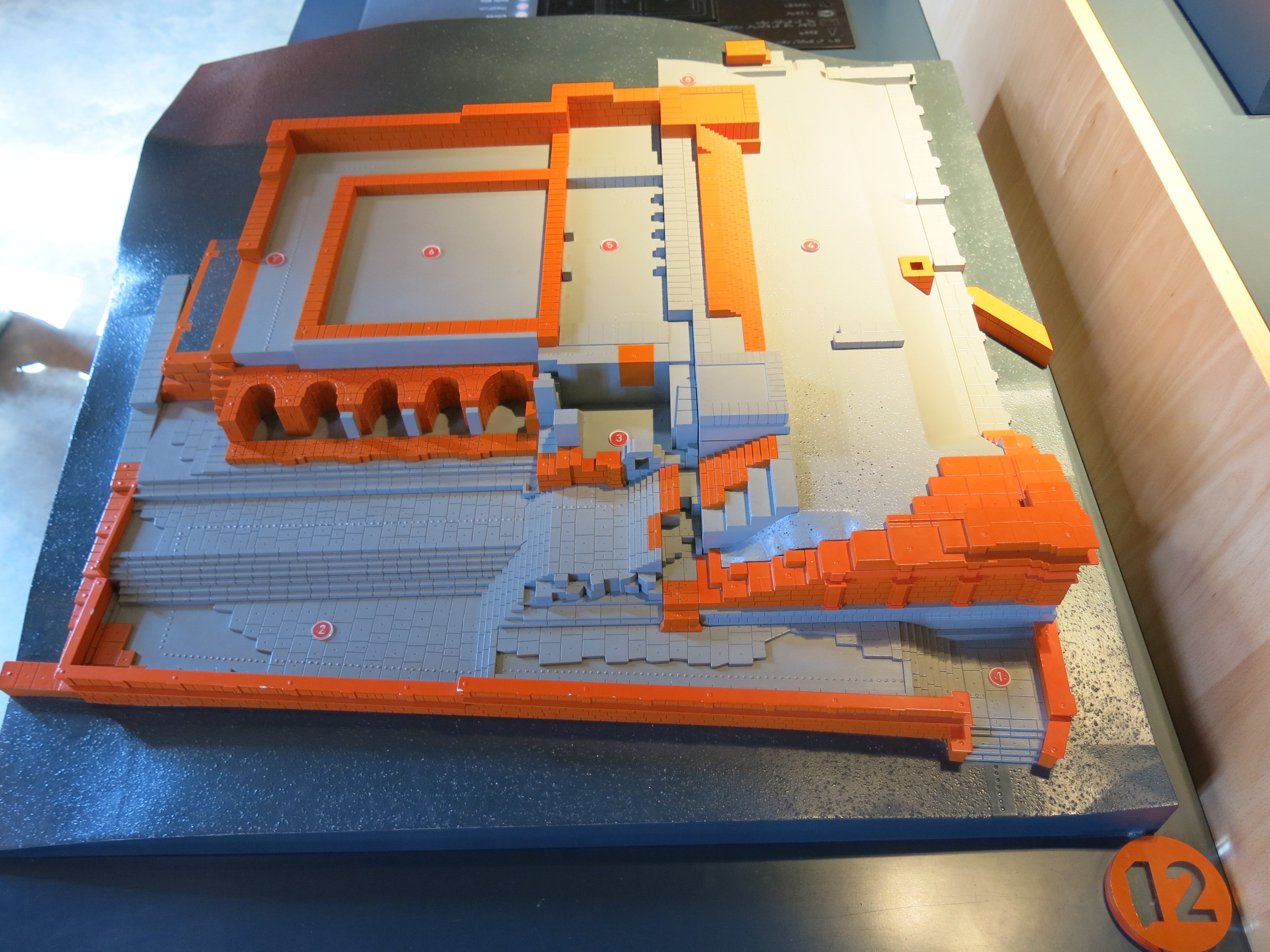
Model of the remains under reconstruction

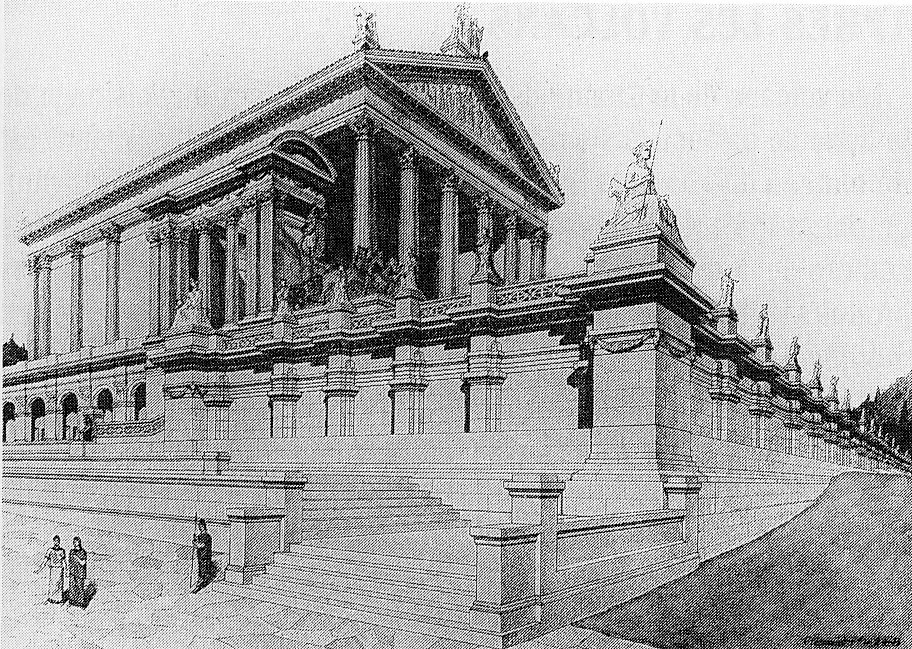
Proposed reconstruction (although there is no remaining evidence of the temple's roof design).

The 2nd-century temple was built on a strong terrace, a quadrilateral with 60-meter sides allowing it to compensate the slope of the ground descending from north to south. Its façade looked east towards the Limagne plain where Augustonemetum was located, and weather permitting, it could be seen from the city. The temple was built with local trachyte, assembled in large blocks for the visible parts, with filling made up of smaller trachyte blocks.

The raw material was extracted near the Ceyssat pass, located at the foot of the Puy de Dôme, but the decoration called on other types of stone with more distant origins—white and colored marbles for the pavements, Autun shales, and arkose column capitals, for example. Bronze was also used. Fragments of the paving are visible at the Bargoin museum in Clermont-Ferrand. In all, the building filled an area of around 3,600 m^{2}.

The actual plan of the temple was a hybrid, an intermediate between Celtic and Mediterranean traditions. Thus the sanctuary included a cella as found in the fana of Celtic tradition, fronted by a Mediterranean pronaos. This cella and pronaos ensemble was located at the top of a series of terraces, intended to punctuate and dramatize the visitor's journey.

Thus the pilgrim, after a steep climb from the Ceyssat pass, and perhaps devotions made at the chapels along the path, would arrive upon a terrace that rose up in tiers and was occupied by altars and statues. From this theater, which could be used for specific ceremonies, the pilgrim would then take a passage that led to the eastern terrace overlooking Augustonemetum and the plain of Limagne. From there, one could access the pronaos and perform devotions in front of and around the cella. A gift might have been made to the god, which, if precious, would have been stored in the nearby treasure room of the temple, located between the two terraces.

=== Dedication ===
During the 1974 excavations, a small bronze tablet with dovetailed handles was discovered, bearing a dedication to imperial power and the god Mercury "Dumiatis". (CIL 13, 1523)

NUM[inibus] AUG[ustorum] ET DEO MERCURI DUMIATI MATUTINIUS VICTORINUS D[onum] D[edit]

This dedication is generally translated as: "In the names of Augustuses and the god Mercury of The Dome, Matutinius Victorinus gave a gift". Archaeologists have since attributed the sanctuary to the deities mentioned. This attribution was later reinforced by Auguste Audollent's discovery of a small Mercury statuette during his excavations in the early 20th century.

Other inscriptions, found in Germany and elsewhere, also express worship of the god Mercury, well-established in the city of Arverne. The votive altar of Miltenberg am Main invokes a Mercury Arvernorix, "king of the Arverni".

Miltenberg (CIL 13, 6603)

MERCVRIO ARVERNORIC[I] COSSILLUS DONAVI ES VISV L(A)ETVS LIBE(N)S MERITO

This dedication can be translated as: "To Mercury, king of the Arverni. Cossillus made this offering voluntarily after a dream."

Inscriptions from Cologne, (Note: Cologne (CIL 13, 8235) MERCVR[IO] [A]RVERN[O] [S]ACRV[M] IVLIVS IV[.] [E]X IMP(ERIO) I[PS(IVS)]) Gripswald, (Note: Gripswald (CIL 13, 8579) MERCVRIO ARVERNO M(ARCVS) IVLIVS AVDAX PRO SE ET SVIS L(IBENS) M(ERITO)) (Note: Gripswald (CIL 13, 8580) MERCVRIO ARVERNO SEXT(VS) SEMPRONIVS SVPER L(IBENS) M(ERITO)) Wenau, (Note: Wenau (CIL 13, 7845) MERCVRIO ARVERNO VICINI V(OTVM?) V[...) and Roermond (Note: Roermond (CIL 13, 8709) MERCVRIO ARVERNO [A]ED(EM?) IRMIDIVS MA[CR]O EX I(VSSV?)) more simply mention a Mercury "Arvernus". It is generally thought that these dedications are the result of Arvernian contingents within the Roman legion stationed on the Limes Germanicus. The dedications are a product of Gallo-Roman syncretism, meaning that - except during official Roman ceremonies, celebrated by expatriate settlers - the "Mercury" worshipped here was not identical with that of Rome.

=== Zenodorus' statue ===
Pliny the Elder reported that a colossal bronze statue had been erected for an Arverni sanctuary by the sculptor Zenodorus.

But all the gigantic statues of this class have been beaten in our period by Zenodorus with the Hermes or Mercury which he made in the community of the Arverni in Gaul; it took him ten years and the sum paid for its making was 40,000,000 sesterces. Having given sufficient proof of his artistic skill in Gaul he was summoned to Rome by Nero, and there made the colossal statue, 106 ft. high, intended to represent that emperor but now, dedicated to the sun after the condemnation of that emperor's crimes, it is an object of awe.

He does not specify whether the Zenodorus Mercury was erected in the sanctuary of Puy de Dôme. If this was the case, no archaeological trace remains.

However, the temple that can be seen today was built almost a century after the events reported by Pliny the Elder. According to the hypothesis where Zenodorus' statue was actually there, it could have been erected with the first temple, whose archaeological vestiges were largely destroyed during the construction of the microwave relay in 1956.

There are arguments to place the erection of the Greek sculptor's work at the summit. First, the fact that the construction of the original temple and the creation of the statue are contemporary. The first temple dates from the middle of the 1st century. Zenodorus stayed in Gaul before working on the colossus of Nero which would adorn the Domus Aurea before its transfer to the Colosseum. The second argument that can be used is that of visibility. The colossal statue would have been almost as visible from the surrounding area as the microwave relay is today. This visibility made it possible to identify the sacred mount of the god and made it possible to evoke that this one, one of whose theonyms is Arvernorix, "king of the Arverni", thus watched over his people.

=== Vasso Galate ===
There has been some debate over whether a mention of an Arverni temple called Vasso Galate in Gregory of Tours's Historia Francorum could refer to the Temple of Mercury at Puy de Dôme. Gregory describes it briefly without, however, mentioning its location.

It is generally considered, since the work of Pierre-François Fournier that the Vasso Galate is the temple located at rue Rameau in Clermont-Ferrand and whose vestiges are also called Mur des Saracens or "Temple of Jaude". On the other hand, Auguste Audollent thought that the sanctuary mentioned by Gregory of Tours was that at Puy de Dôme. He was also surprised at the persistence of attendance in a supposedly destroyed temple. The confusion comes in part from the expression veniens vero arvernus which can be translated as "Coming to Auvernis" or "Coming to Clermont" (at the time of Gregory of Tours, Clermont-Ferrand was called Arvernis).

The term "Jaude" designating the district where the Clermont ruins are found would be related to "Galate" via a medieval form "Jalde". However it has also been argued that the Bishop of Tours' description of the Vasso Galate seems to agree better with the plan and ornamentation of the Puy de Dôme sanctuary. But on the other hand, the design of the temple of Clermont remains generally poorly known. Another consideration is a dedication to Mercury found in Germany which invokes the theonym Vassocaleti. Many authors have connected this epithet to Gregory's term for the temple.

The two temples are contemporary, with the Clermont site having produced coins dating from the reign of Augustus. And if the dedication of the sanctuary of Clermont remains unknown, there is consensus for considering the temple to be located at rue Rameau.

== Surroundings ==
=== Ceyssat Pass ===
The Puy de Dôme sanctuary was serviced by a path that started from the Roman road linking Lugdunum (Lyon) to Mediolanum Santonum (Saintes), at the level of the Ceyssat Pass. There was a secondary town with at least one temple allowing the traveler in a hurry to fulfill their devotion to Mercury without having to climb to the top. A building acting as a road relay is also suspected. There are also traces of an artisanal district around the trachyte quarry which supplied the summit temple with the stone necessary for its construction. Finally, a funerary area is nearby.

This secondary agglomeration fully participates in the sacralization of the mount, the road which leads to the sanctuary being dotted with temples, at the foot of the volcano, with the temple of the Tourette d'Enval in Orcines, passing through those, intermediate, from the Ceyssat Pass to the summit temple.

=== Other cult sites ===
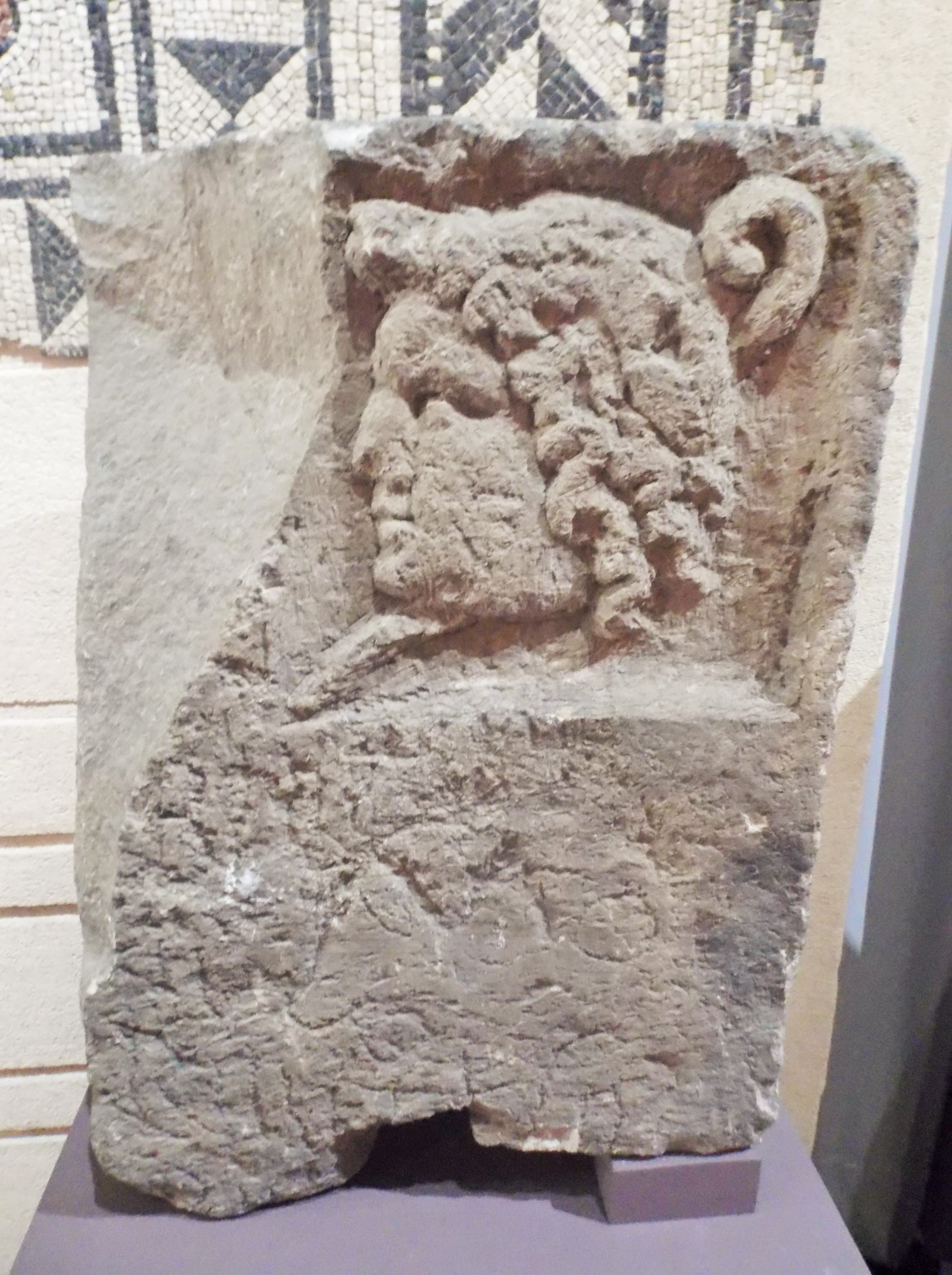
Stele from Orcines with a relief of Mercury. Temple of Mercury complex, 2nd century CE.

The very name of the Arverni capital in Roman times, Augustonemetum, "Sanctuary of Augustus", suggests the presence of an imperial cult within the city. This imperial cult, however, did not leave any tangible traces and the only sanctuary attested is that whose remains are called Mur des Saracens, located at rue Rameau in Clermont-Ferrand and identified, without the debate being settled, as the Vasso Galate mentioned by Gregory of Tours.

Augustonemetum had, however, a certain number of peri-urban sanctuaries, of various importance, such as the sanctuary of Source des Roches in Chamalières, whose activity did not reach the 1st century CE; the temple des Côtes in Blanzat, discovered by P. Eychart in the 1950s; that of Trémonteix, a private sanctuary linked to an ancient domain, discovered in 2012; or the Fanum of Brezet nearby Aulnat.

One of these sanctuaries, the Tourette d'Enval temple in Orcines can be directly associated with the cult complex formed by the Puy de Dôme sanctuary and the agglomeration of the Ceyssat Pass. Dedicated to Mercury, it marks the beginning of the ascent of the mountain.

A wider circle around Puy de Dôme also includes the sanctuaries of the Corent and Gergovie oppida, the first dating back to the 2nd century BCE and which remained active until the 3rd century CE, the second dating from the Augustan Age. A third fanum, that of La Sauvetat, below Puy de Corent to the south, can also be mentioned.

Finally, on the same ancient route as the agglomeration of the Ceyssat Pass, but located near the Lemovices border, was a secondary agglomeration provided with a sanctuary excavated in 1882 and in the 1950s. This sanctuary, the site of Beauclair on the territory of the municipalities of Giat and Voingt, produced graffiti naming the god Toutatis.

== See also ==
- List of Ancient Roman temples
- Arverni
- Augustonemetum
- Gallo-Roman culture
- Gaulish Mercury
- Puy de Dôme
- Roman Settlement of the Col de Ceyssat

== Bibliography ==
- Audollent, Auguste (1900). "Les ruines du temple de Mercure Dumias au sommet du Puy-de-Dôme". Comptes rendus des séances de l'Académie des Inscriptions et Belles-Lettres (in French). 44 (3): 329–331. OCLC 754301648.
- Audollent, Auguste (1906). "Note sur une statuette de Mercure découverte au sommet du Puy de Dôme". Comptes rendus des séances de l'Académie des Inscriptions et Belles-Lettres (in French). 50 (6): 393–399.
- Clémençon, B.; Ganne, P.M. (June 20, 2008), Toutatis chez les Arvernes !, Association pour la Recherche sur l'Age du Fer en Auvergne (ARAFA), archived from the original on February 2, 2017
- Dartevelle, Hélène. "Le temple de Mercure". Augustonemetum (in French).
- Dartevelle, Hélène. "Le Vasso Galate". Augustonemetum (in French).
- Félix, Ravaisson (1886). "Visite du temple de Mercure découvert au sommet du Puy de Dôme". Comptes rendus des séances de l'Académie des Inscriptions et Belles-Lettres (in French). 30 (2): 172–173. OCLC 754304181.
- Fournier, Pierre-François (1965). "Le monument dit Vasso de Jaude à Clermont-Ferrand". Gallia (in French). 23 (1). Revue Gallia; CNRS Editions: 103–150. doi:10.3406/galia.1965.2221. JSTOR 43604464.
- Héron de Villefosse, Antoine (1901). "Découverte d'antiquités romaines sur le Puy-de-Dôme". Comptes rendus des séances de l'Académie des Inscriptions et Belles-Lettres (in French). 45 (4): 567.
- Paillet, Jean-Louis; Tardy, Dominique (2003), "Un site archéologique en milieu extrême : le temple de Mercure au sommet du puy de Dôme", Vestiges archéologiques en milieu extrême, Idées et débats (in French), Paris: Institut nationale du patrimoine, pp. 32–49, ISBN 2-85822-748-9
- Paillet, Jean-Louis; Tardy, Dominique (2012), "Le sanctuaire de Mercure au sommet du puy de Dôme : le cadre architectural d'un circuit processionnel", in de Cazanove, Olivier; Méniel, Patrice (eds.), Étudier les lieux de culte de Gaule romaine, Archéologie et histoire romaine (in French), vol. 24, Montagnac: Monique Mergoil, pp. 197–207, ISBN 978-2-35518-029-3
- "Petrae". Petrae- Fiche Petrae.
- Pliny the Elder. "XVIII". Naturalis Historia. Vol. XXXIV.
- Manry, André-Georges (1993). Histoire de Clermont-Ferrand (in French). Bouhdiba. p. 28. ISBN 2903377154.
- Mitton, Claire (April 8, 2008). "Les sanctuaires arvernes et vellaves hors des chefs-lieux de cités du ier s. av. J.-C. au ive s. ap. J.-C. : approche typologique et spatiale". Revue archéologique du Centre de la France (in French). Tome 45-46.
- Rykner, Didier (October 14, 2014). "À quoi sert la législation des monuments historiques ? (6) : le temple de Mercure". latribunedelart.com (in French). La tribune de l'art.
- Poux, Matthieu; Garcia, Magali; Beck, Noémie (n.d.), De Mercure Arverne à Mercure Dumias: Sanctuaires périurbains, géosymboles et lieux de mémoire en Basse Auvergne, pp. 319–347
- Thivat, Geneviève (January 31, 2017). "Offrir tout le caractère monumental du Temple de Mercure, en haut du puy de Dôme". La Montagne (in French).
- Trément, Frédéric (2013), "Une agglomération routière et cultuelle au col de Ceyssat (Puy-de-Dôme)", in Trément, Frédéric (ed.), Les Arvernes et leurs voisins du Massif Central à l'époque romaine : une archéologie du développement des territoires, Revue d'Auvergne (in French), vol. Tome 2, Clermont-Ferrand: Alliance Universitaire d'Auvergne, pp. 71–89, ISSN 1269-8946
- "Le temple de Mercure : une splendeur vénérée dans toute la Gaulle". Connaît Clermont: Fiches patrimoine (in French). Ville de Clermont-Ferrand. October 1, 1998. Archived from the original on December 14, 2013.
