= Chassaigne =

Chassaigne is a French surname. Notable people with the surname include:

- André Chassaigne (born 1950), French politician
- Anne-Marie Chassaigne (1869–1950), better known as Liane de Pougy, French courtesan, dancer and novelist
- Francis Chassaigne (1847–1922), Belgian-born French classical composer

== See also ==
- Jean Bouillet de la Chassaigne (1654–1733)
