= Vicus =

Ancient Roman term for a rural village or neighborhood

In Ancient Rome, the Latin term vicus (plural vici) designated a village within a rural area (pagus) or the neighbourhood of a larger settlement. During the Republican era, the four regiones of the city of Rome were subdivided into vici. In the 1st century BC, Augustus reorganized the city for administrative purposes into 14 regions, comprising 265 vici. Each vicus had its own board of officials who oversaw local matters. These administrative divisions are recorded as still in effect at least until the mid-4th century.

The word "vicus" was also applied to the smallest administrative unit of a provincial town within the Roman Empire, referring to an ad hoc provincial civilian settlement that sprang up close to and because of a nearby military fort or state-owned mining operation.

== Local government in Rome ==
Each vicus elected four local magistrates (vicomagistri) who commanded a sort of local police force chosen from among the people of the vicus by lot. Occasionally the officers of the vicomagistri would feature in certain celebrations (primarily the Compitalia) in which they were accompanied by two lictors.

== Ad hoc settlements ==
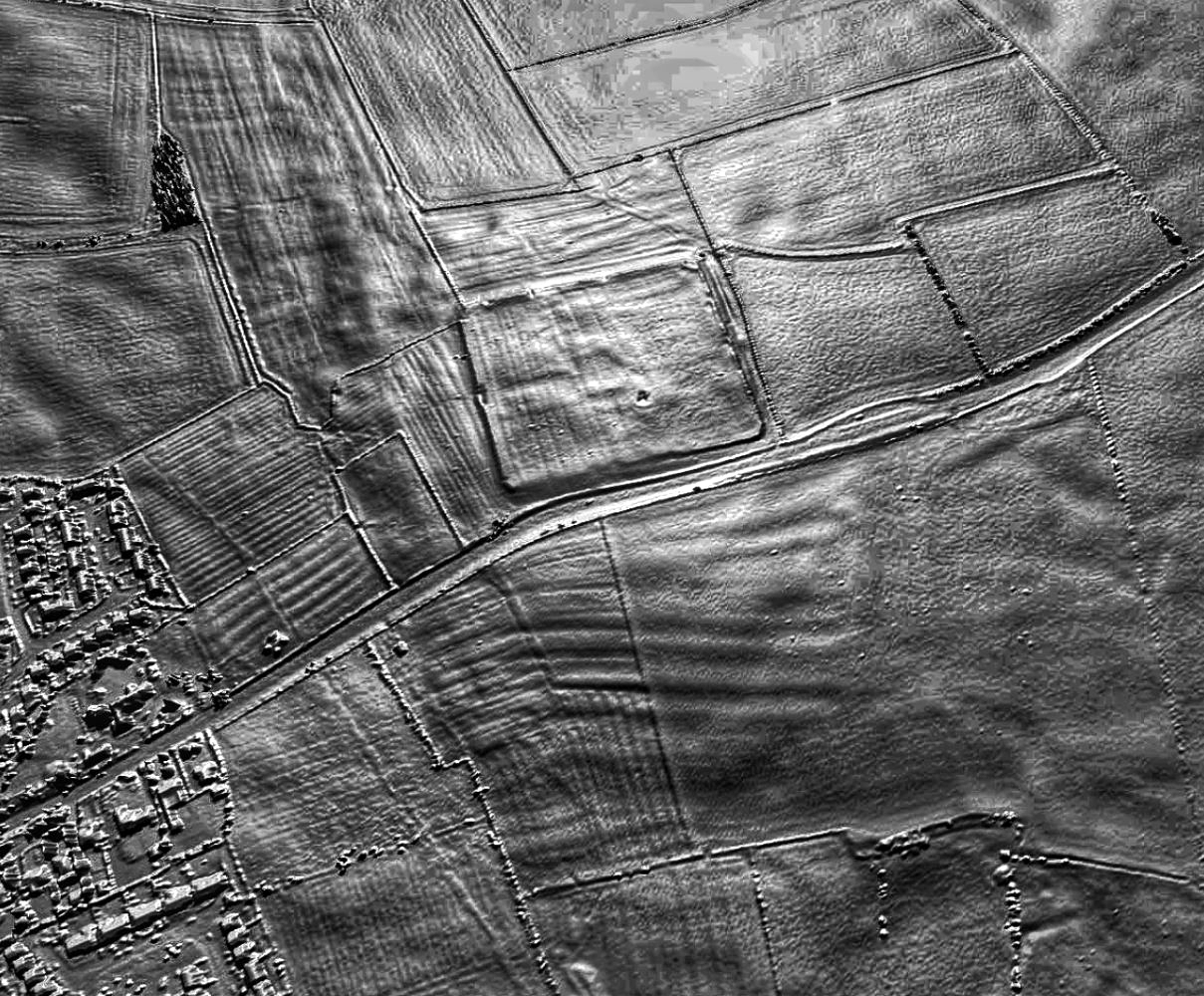
A lidar view of Lanchester Roman fort Longovicium and vicus in Durham, England.

These vici differed from the planned civilian towns (civitates), which were laid out as official, local economic and administrative centres, the coloniae, which were settlements of retired troops, or the formal political entities created from existing settlements, the municipia. Unplanned, and originally lacking any public administrative buildings, vici had no specific legal status (unlike other settlements) and often developed in order to profit from the presence of Roman troops. As with most garrison towns, they provided entertainment and supplies for the troops, but many also developed significant industries, especially metal and glass working. Some vici seem not to have had direct connections to troop placement (e.g., the Vicus Martis Tudertium).

Vici is the term used for the extramural settlements of forts for military units (e.g. alae and cohorts), while canabae is generally used to describe extramural settlements of the major legionary fortresses, e.g. Eboracum (York), Vindobona (Vienna), Durostorum (Silistra, Bulgaria). Initially ephemeral, many vici were transitory sites that followed a mobile unit; once a permanent garrison was established they grew into larger townships. Often the number of official civitates and coloniæ were not enough to settle everyone who wished to live in a town and so vici also attracted a wider range of residents, with some becoming chartered towns where no other existed nearby. Some, such as that at Vercovicium (Housesteads), outgrew their forts altogether, especially in the 3rd century once soldiers were permitted to marry.

Early vici had no civilian administration and were under the direct control of the Roman military commander. Those that attracted significant numbers of Roman citizens were later permitted to form local councils and some, such as the vicus at Eboracum (York), grew into regional centres and even provincial capitals.

== Modern placenames ==
The Latin term, pronounced with an initial 'u', was adopted into Old English as wic, wick, wich, or wych. It became one of the most widely occurring common placename elements, e.g. Wyck, Hackney Wick, Gatwick, Exwick, Wickham, Aldwych, Dulwich, Ipswich, Norwich, and indirectly York, from Eoforwic via Old Norse Jorvik. In the Brittonic languages, the cognate word is gwig in Welsh and Cornish and guic in Breton; all now meaning "village". The place-name Wigan may directly reference the Roman vicus of Coccium. In continental languages, the term became Old High German wih "village", Modern German Weichbild "municipal area", Dutch wijk "quarter, district", Old Frisian wik, Old Saxon wic "village".

== See also ==
- 14 regions of Augustan Rome
- Pagus
- Roman Settlement of the Col de Ceyssat
