= Mazaye =

- Commune
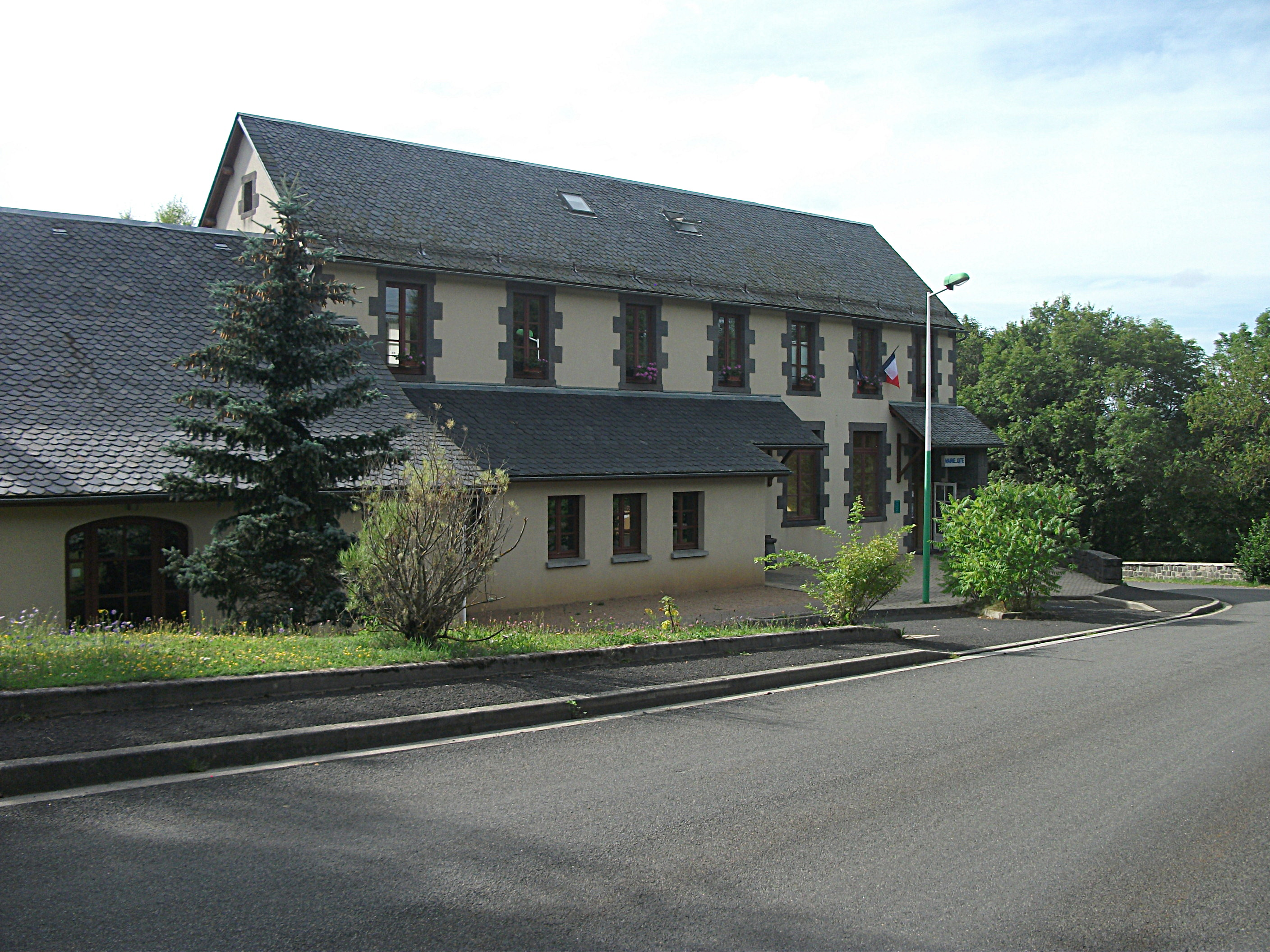
- Town hall
- Location of Mazaye
- Location within France Location within Auvergne-Rhône-Alpes
- Coordinates: 45°47′11″N 2°51′37″E
- Country: France
- Region: Auvergne-Rhône-Alpes
- Department: Puy-de-Dôme
- Arrondissement: Issoire
- Canton: Orcines
- Intercommunality: Dômes Sancy Artense

Government
  - Mayor (2020–2026): Patrick Durand
- Area^{1}: 21.73 km^{2} (8.39 sq mi)
- Elevation: 695 m (2,280 ft)
- Highest elevation: 958 m (3,143 ft)
- Lowest elevation: 676 m (2,218 ft)
- Population (2023): 719
  - Density: 33.1/km^{2} (85.7/sq mi)
- Time zone: UTC+01:00 (CET)
  - Summer (DST): UTC+02:00 (CEST)
- INSEE/Postal code: 63219 /63230
- ^{1} French Land Register data, which excludes lakes, ponds, glaciers > 1 km^{2} (0.386 sq mi or 247 acres) and river estuaries.

Mazaye (French pronunciation: [mazaj]; Occitan: Masaia) is a commune in the Puy-de-Dôme department in Auvergne-Rhône-Alpes in central France.

== See also ==
- Communes of the Puy-de-Dôme department
