= Terra nigra =

Stoneware produced in early Gaul

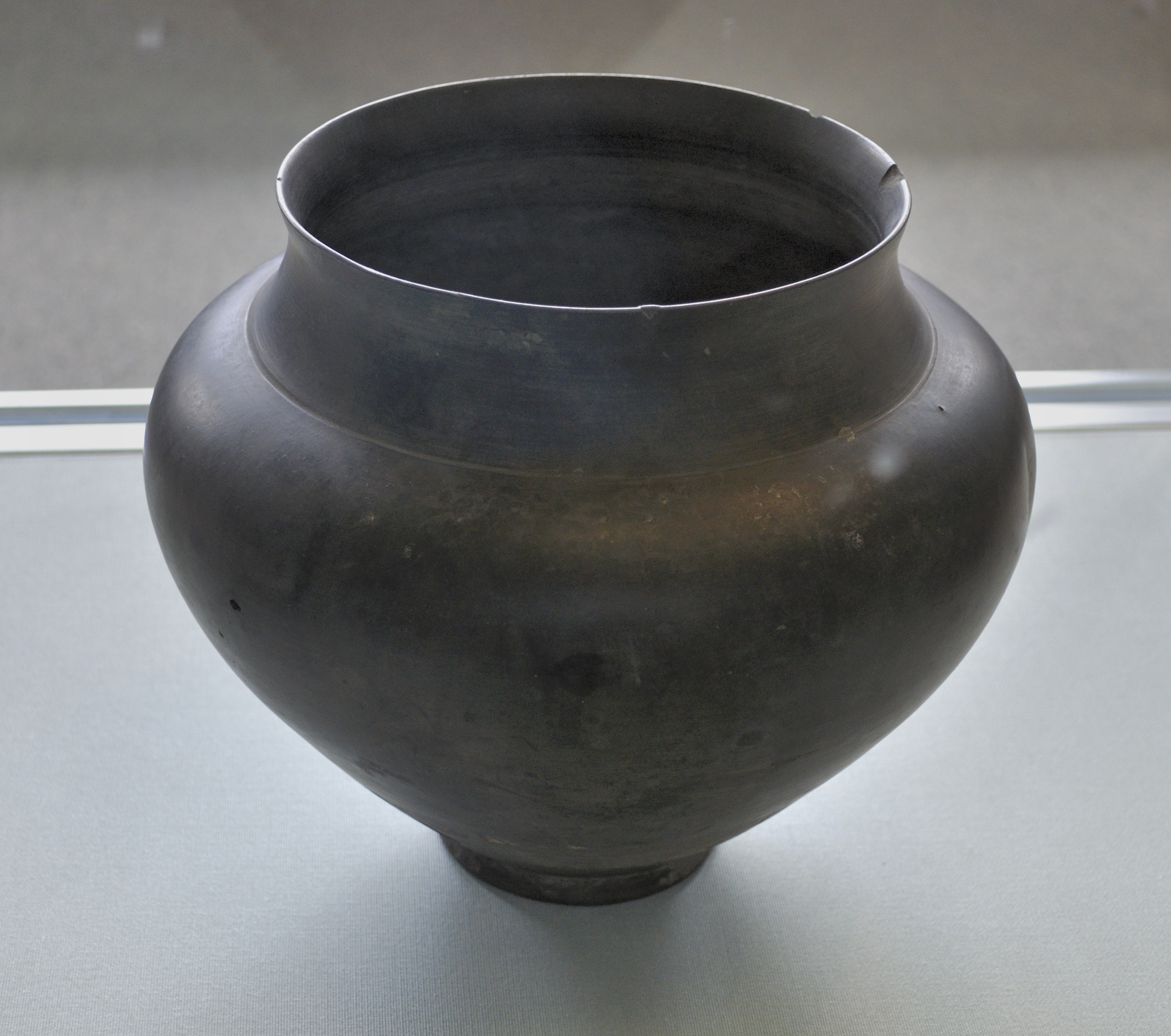
Roman shoulder pot, Hetjens Museum Düsseldorf

Terra nigra refers to black or silver-grey stoneware such as plates or cups produced between the first century BC and the first century AD in northern Gaul, distributed across northeast Gaul and southeast Britain, now most often found in Britain.
