= Orcines =

- Commune
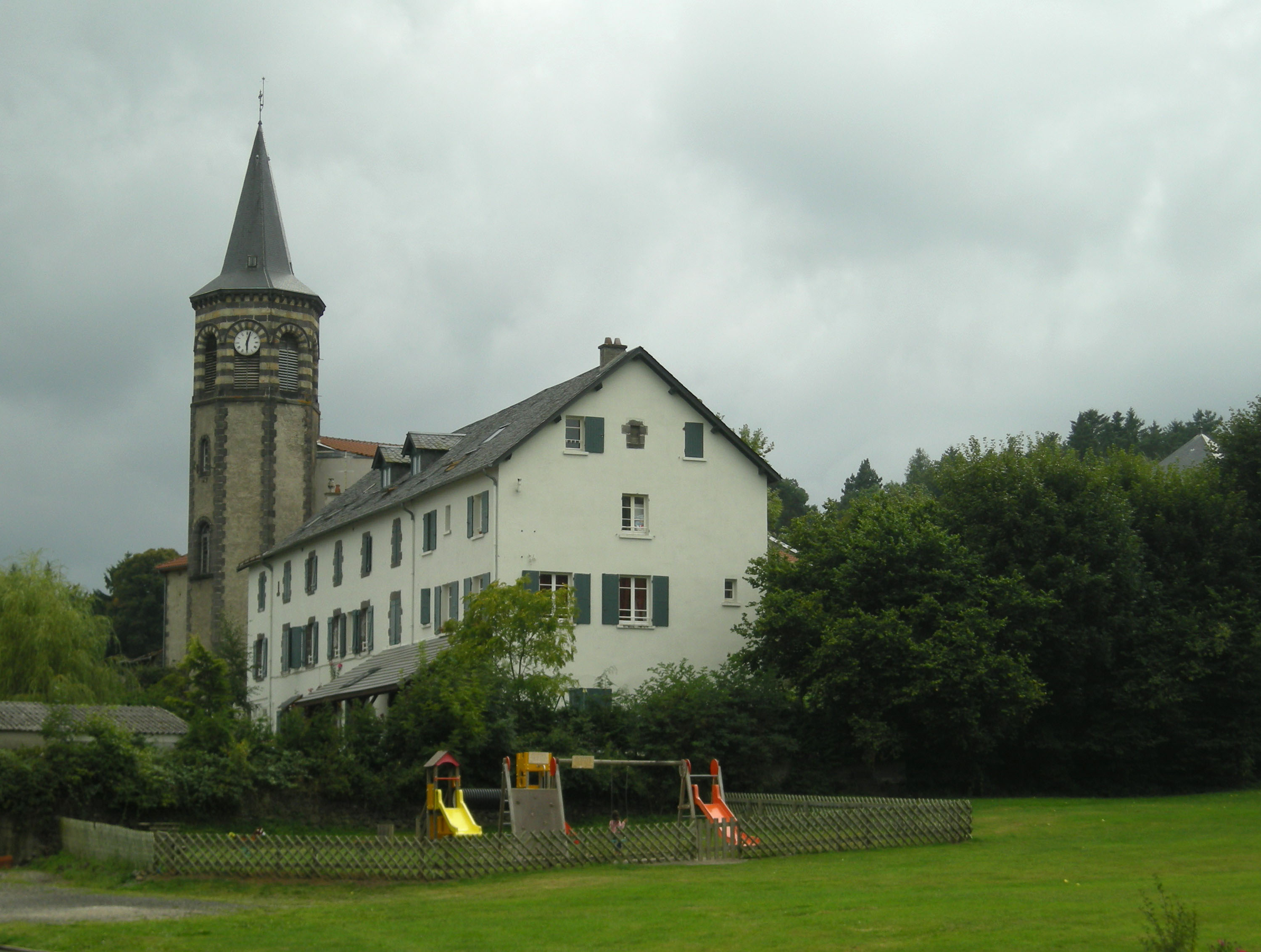
- Church Orcines
- Location of Orcines
- Location within France Location within Auvergne-Rhône-Alpes
- Coordinates: 45°47′00″N 3°00′47″E
- Country: France
- Region: Auvergne-Rhône-Alpes
- Department: Puy-de-Dôme
- Arrondissement: Clermont-Ferrand
- Canton: Orcines
- Intercommunality: Clermont Auvergne Métropole

Government
  - Mayor (2020–2026): Jean-Marc Morvan
- Area^{1}: 42.73 km^{2} (16.50 sq mi)
- Elevation: 836 m (2,743 ft)
- Highest elevation: 1,465 m (4,806 ft)
- Lowest elevation: 480 m (1,570 ft)
- Population (2023): 3,609
  - Density: 84.46/km^{2} (218.8/sq mi)
- Time zone: UTC+01:00 (CET)
  - Summer (DST): UTC+02:00 (CEST)
- INSEE/Postal code: 63263 /63870
- ^{1} French Land Register data, which excludes lakes, ponds, glaciers > 1 km^{2} (0.386 sq mi or 247 acres) and river estuaries.

Orcines (French pronunciation: [ɔʁsin]) is a commune in the Puy-de-Dôme department in Auvergne in central France. Located at the foot of the Chaine des Puys, Orcines is an important village for the hikers who come visiting the natural heritage in Auvergne. The town belongs to the rural area of Clermont-Ferrand.

== Geography ==
Apart from Orcines proper, the commune also includes fifteen villages : Ternant, Sarcenat, La Fontaine du Berger, Chez Vasson, Le Gressigny, Solagnat, La Baraque, Villars, La Font de l'Arbre, Montrodeix, where the small river Tiretaine originates, Enval, Le Cheix, Bonnabry, Bellevue et Fontanas, one of the most sizeable.

== Population ==
Historical population
Year	Pop.	±% p.a.
1968	1,814	—
1975	2,104	+2.14%
1982	2,516	+2.59%
1990	2,873	+1.67%
1999	3,067	+0.73%
2007	3,238	+0.68%
2012	3,296	+0.36%
2017	3,388	+0.55%
2023	3,609	+1.06%
Source: INSEE

== People ==
- Rev. Pierre Teilhard de Chardin, S.J.
- The population in this village is relatively older than the average in France (see French article).

== See also ==
- Communes of the Puy-de-Dôme department
