= Jean Bouillet de la Chassaigne =

Canadian politician

Jean Bouillet de la Chassaigne (June 1654 – January 31, 1733) was a soldier in New France. He served as governor of Trois-Rivières from 1726 to 1730 and as governor of Montreal from 1730 to 1733. He was also known as Jean-Baptiste.

The son of Gaudefroy Bouillet, a lawyer and seigneur of the fief of La Chassagne, and Anne Bartaud, he was born at Paray in France and joined the Régiment de Navarre in 1672, reaching the rank of lieutenant. In 1677, he became a captain in the Régiment de Condé and, in 1687, was given command of a company of the colonial regular troops in Canada. In 1690, La Chassaigne was commander of Fort Lachine. He became a midshipman in 1693, a captain in the following year and a naval sub-lieutenant in 1695. In 1699, he married Marie-Anne, the daughter of Charles le Moyne de Longueuil, Baron de Longueuil. He served as town major of Montreal in 1710. In 1711, he was awarded the Cross of Saint-Louis. He became town major of Quebec City in 1716, king's lieutenant at Montreal in 1720, governor of Trois-Rivières in 1726 and governor of Montreal in 1730. La Chassaigne died in Montreal at the age of 78.

During his life he owned 2 slaves.
