= Auguste Audollent =

French historian, archaeologist and Latin epigrapher (1864–1943)

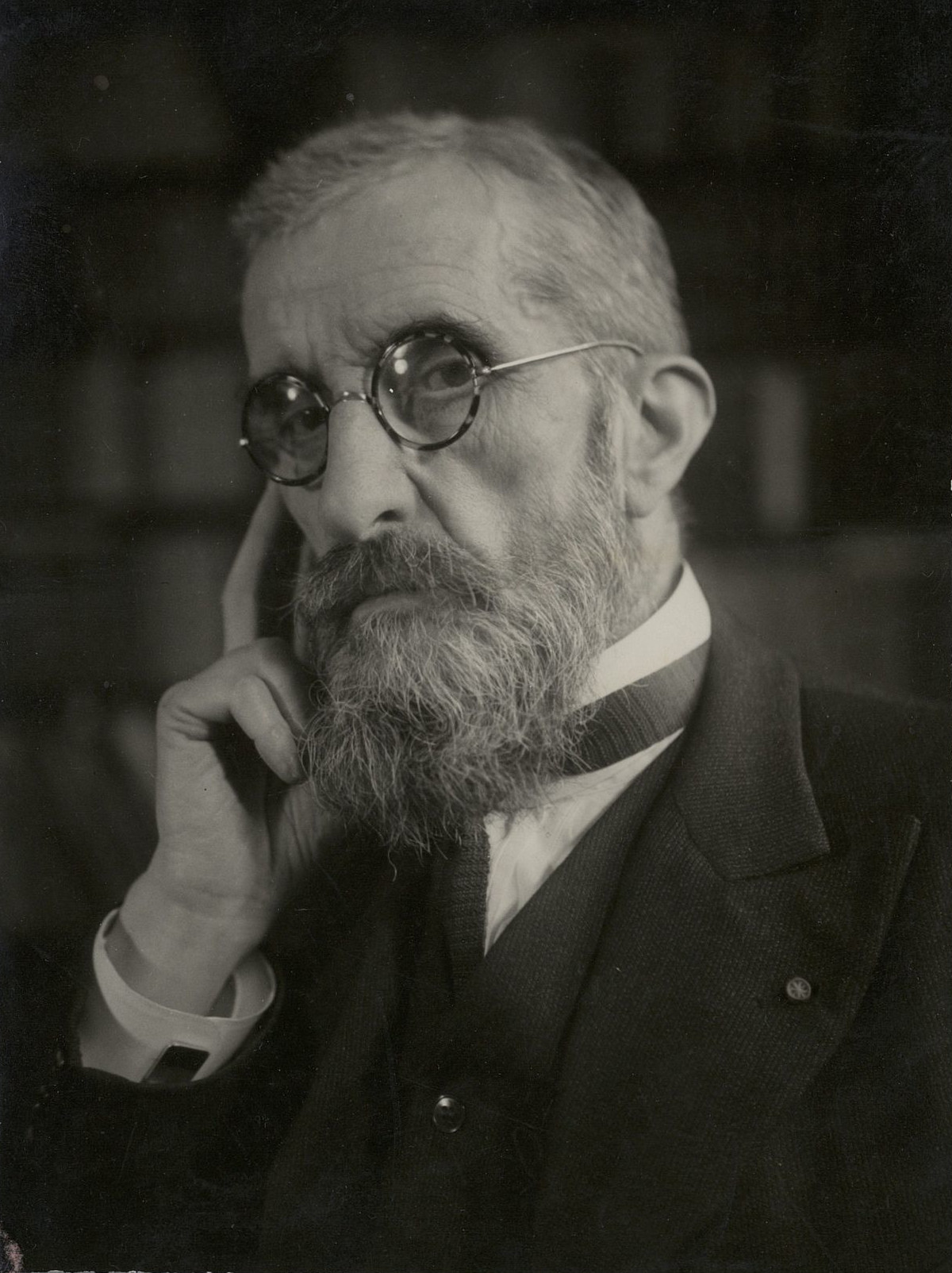
- Born: 14 July 1864; Paris, France
- Died: 7 April 1943 (aged 78); Clermont-Ferrand, France
- Occupations: Historian; Archaeologist; Epigrapher

Auguste Audollent (14 July 1864 – 7 April 1943) was a French historian, archaeologist and Latin epigrapher, specialist of ancient Rome, in particular the magical inscriptions (tabellæ defixionum). His main thesis was devoted to Roman Carthage.

He was elected a member of the Académie des Inscriptions et Belles-Lettres in 1932.

== Publications ==
- 1890: Mission épigraphique en Algérie de MM. Aug. Audollent et J. Letaille octobre 1889 à février 1890. Rapport rédigé par M. Audollent, ASIN B001CH4WJU
- 1901: Carthage romaine : 146 avant Jésus-Christ - 698 après Jésus-Christ, Paris, Fontemoing, (doctorate thesis).
- 1905: Les Tabellae defixionum d'Afrique, Extrait du 'Bulletin archéologique'
- 1911: Les tombes à incinération du musée de Clermont-Ferrand, ASIN B0000DUK01
- 1927: L'énigme de Glozel.

== Bibliography ==
- Gustave Dupont-Ferrier, Éloge funèbre de M. Auguste Audollent, Comptes rendus de l'Académie des inscriptions et belles-lettres, 1943, (p. 194–199).
- Auguste Diès, Notice sur la vie et les travaux de M. Auguste Audollent, membre de l'Académie, Comptes rendus des séances de l'Académie des inscriptions et belles-lettres, 97e année, n° 3, 1953, (p. 334–350).
