= Ceyssat =

- Commune
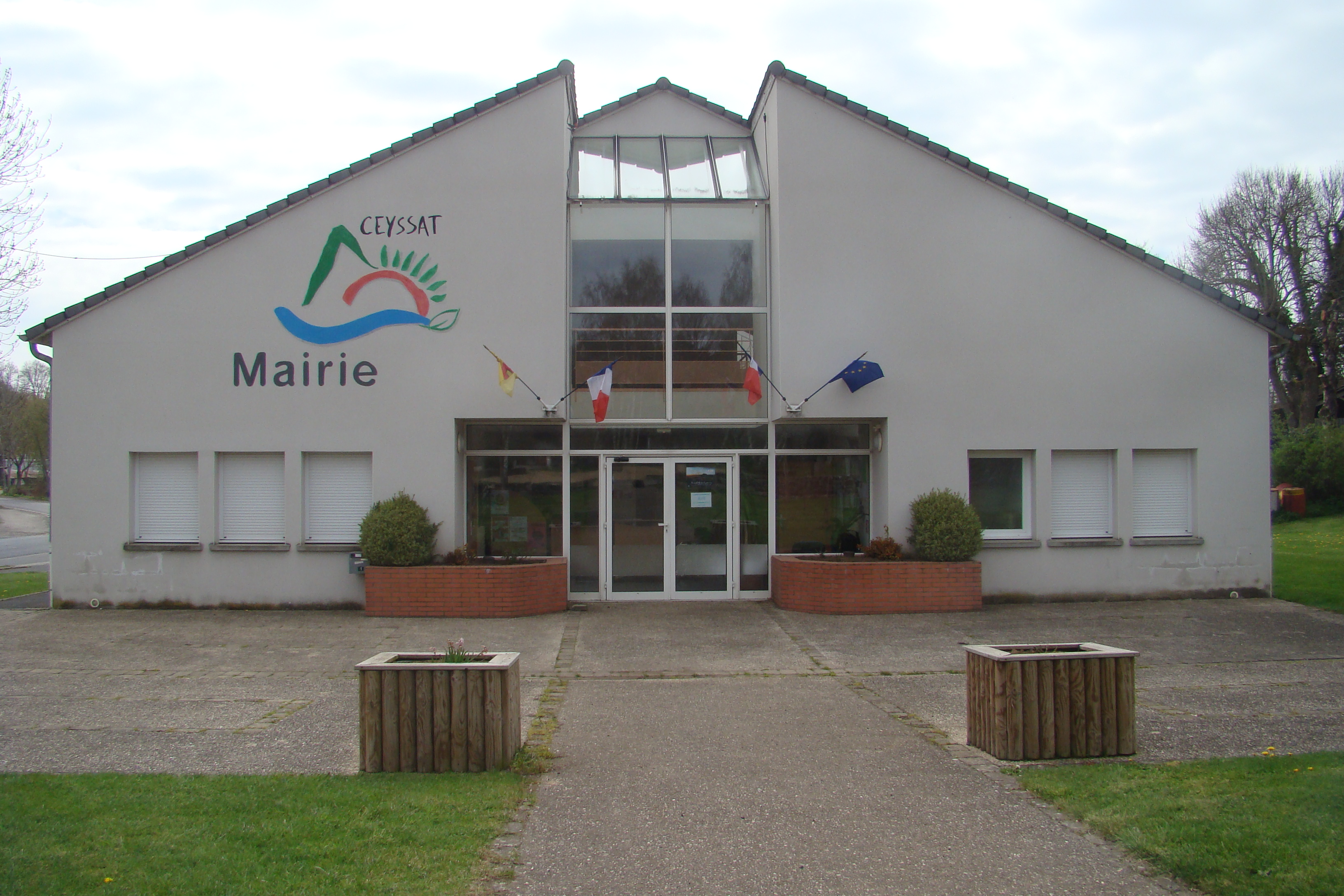
- The town hall in Ceyssat
- Location of Ceyssat
- Location within France Location within Auvergne-Rhône-Alpes
- Coordinates: 45°45′59″N 2°53′50″E
- Country: France
- Region: Auvergne-Rhône-Alpes
- Department: Puy-de-Dôme
- Arrondissement: Issoire
- Canton: Orcines

Government
  - Mayor (2020–2026): Gilles Allauze
- Area^{1}: 30.17 km^{2} (11.65 sq mi)
- Elevation: 790 m (2,590 ft)
- Highest elevation: 1,410 m (4,630 ft)
- Lowest elevation: 757 m (2,484 ft)
- Population (2023): 697
  - Density: 23.1/km^{2} (59.8/sq mi)
- Time zone: UTC+01:00 (CET)
  - Summer (DST): UTC+02:00 (CEST)
- INSEE/Postal code: 63071 /63210
- ^{1} French Land Register data, which excludes lakes, ponds, glaciers > 1 km^{2} (0.386 sq mi or 247 acres) and river estuaries.

Ceyssat (French pronunciation: [sesa]; Occitan: Ceissac) is a commune in the Puy-de-Dôme department in Auvergne-Rhône-Alpes in central France.

== See also ==
- Communes of the Puy-de-Dôme department
