= Voingt =

- Commune
- Location of Voingt
- Location within France Location within Auvergne-Rhône-Alpes
- Coordinates: 45°48′26″N 2°32′15″E
- Country: France
- Region: Auvergne-Rhône-Alpes
- Department: Puy-de-Dôme
- Arrondissement: Riom
- Canton: Saint-Ours
- Intercommunality: Chavanon Combrailles et Volcans

Government
  - Mayor (2026–32): Josias Garcia
- Area^{1}: 6.48 km^{2} (2.50 sq mi)
- Elevation: 754 m (2,474 ft)
- Highest elevation: 814 m (2,671 ft)
- Lowest elevation: 715 m (2,346 ft)
- Population (2023): 58
  - Density: 9.0/km^{2} (23/sq mi)
- Time zone: UTC+01:00 (CET)
  - Summer (DST): UTC+02:00 (CEST)
- INSEE/Postal code: 63467 /63620
- ^{1} French Land Register data, which excludes lakes, ponds, glaciers > 1 km^{2} (0.386 sq mi or 247 acres) and river estuaries.

Voingt (French pronunciation: [vwɛ̃]; Occitan: Vint) is a commune in the Puy-de-Dôme department in Auvergne in central France.

== See also ==
- Communes of the Puy-de-Dôme department
