= Girija =

Girija is one of the names of Parvati, the wife of the Hindu god Shiva. The word in Sanskrit means "one who is born to mountain (Giri)".

Girija may refer to:

== People ==
- Girija (actress) (1938–1995), Telugu film actress
- Shruti (actress), born Girija, Indian actress
- V. M. Girija (born 1961), Indian poet and essayist

=== Given name ===
- Girija Shankar Bajpai (1891–1954), Indian civil servant and diplomat
- Girija Devi (1929–2017), Indian classical singer of the Banaras gharana
- Girija Prasad Koirala (1924–2010), Nepalese politician (1925–2010), President of the Nepali Congress and Prime Minister of Nepal
- Girija Shettar (born 1969), Indian actress
- Girija Vyas (born 1946), Indian politician, poet, and author
- Girija Keer (1933–2019), Indian Marathi language writer
- Girija Prasad Joshi (1939–1987), Nepalese poet
- Girija Oak (born 1987), Indian actress
- Girija Kumar Mathur (1918–1994), Indian writer of the Hindi language

== Other uses ==
- Girija (village), Lithuania
- Girija Dam, in India Maharashtra
- Vanaja Girija, a 1994 Indian Tamil-language comedy film directed by Keyaar
- Girija Kalyanam (lit. 'Marriage of Girija'), a novel by Indian writer Yaddanapudi Sulochana Rani, adapted into a film and a TV series
