= Geographical midpoint of Europe =

Geographical centre of Europe

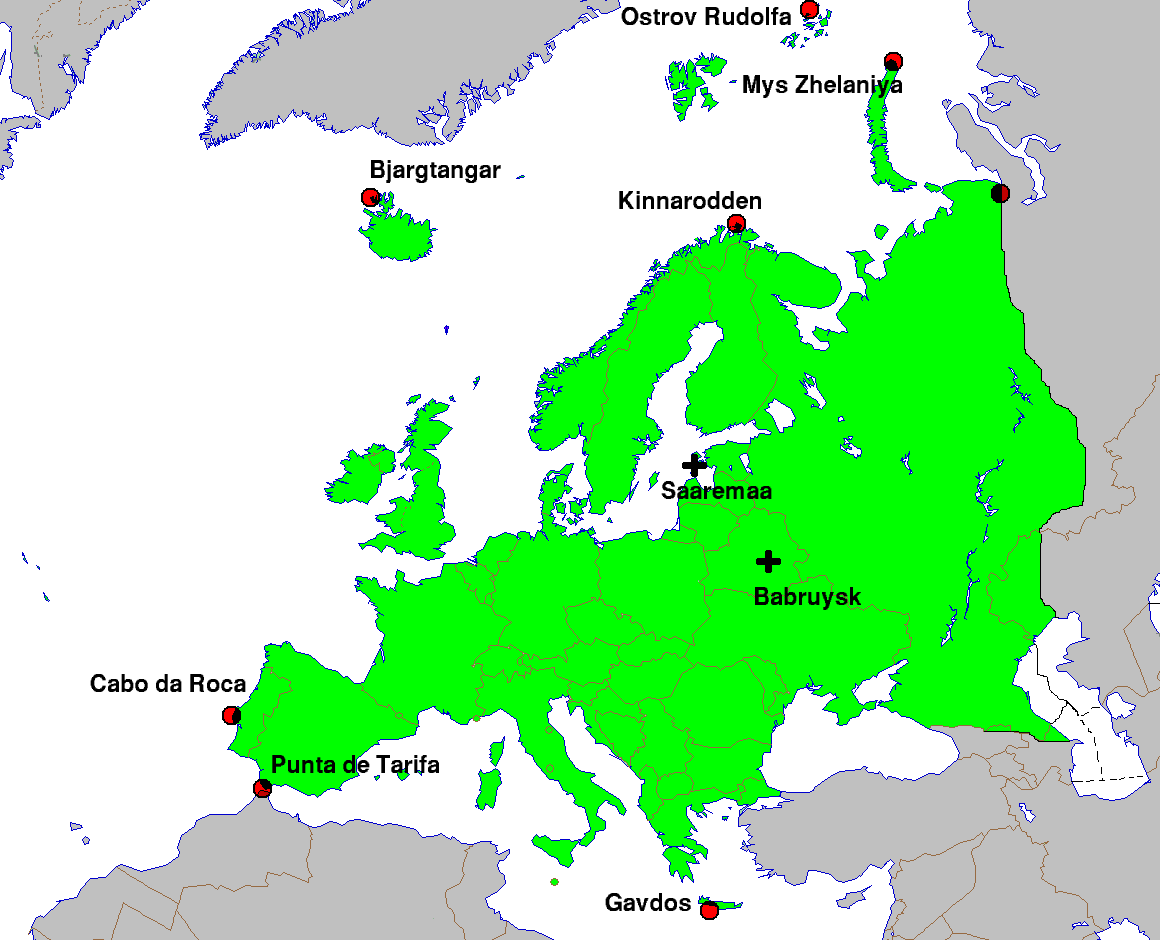
Extreme points of Europe and two of its geographic centres: the Saaremaa island in western Estonia, and Babruysk in Belarus.

The location of the geographical centre of Europe depends on the definition of the borders of Europe, mainly whether remote islands are included to define the extreme points of Europe, and on the method of calculating the final result. Thus, several places claim to host this hypothetical centre.

== Current claimants ==
- The village of Kremnické Bane or the neighbouring village Krahule, near Kremnica, in central Slovakia
- The small town of Rakhiv, or the village of Dilove near Rakhiv, in western Ukraine
- The village of Girija, near Vilnius, in Lithuania
- A point on the island of Saaremaa in Estonia
- A point near Polotsk, or in Vitebsk, or near Babruysk, or near lake Sho in Belarus
- A point near the town of Tállya, in north-eastern Hungary
- The small historic town of Kouřim in Czech Republic

== Extreme points of Europe ==
The picture above shows the extreme points of Europe, northern, southern, and western. The northern, which are Ostrov Rudolfa or Rudolf Island, a Russian island, Kinnarodden, a tourist attraction in Norway, and Mys Zhelaniya or Cape Zhelaniya, the northernmost point of Severny Island, Russia. The extreme southern parts of Europe are Punta de Tarifa, the southernmost point on the Spanish mainland, and Gavdos, an island in Greece under the administrative region of Crete. The extreme westernmost point of the European mainland is Cabo da Roca in Portugal.

== History of claims ==
=== Poland ===
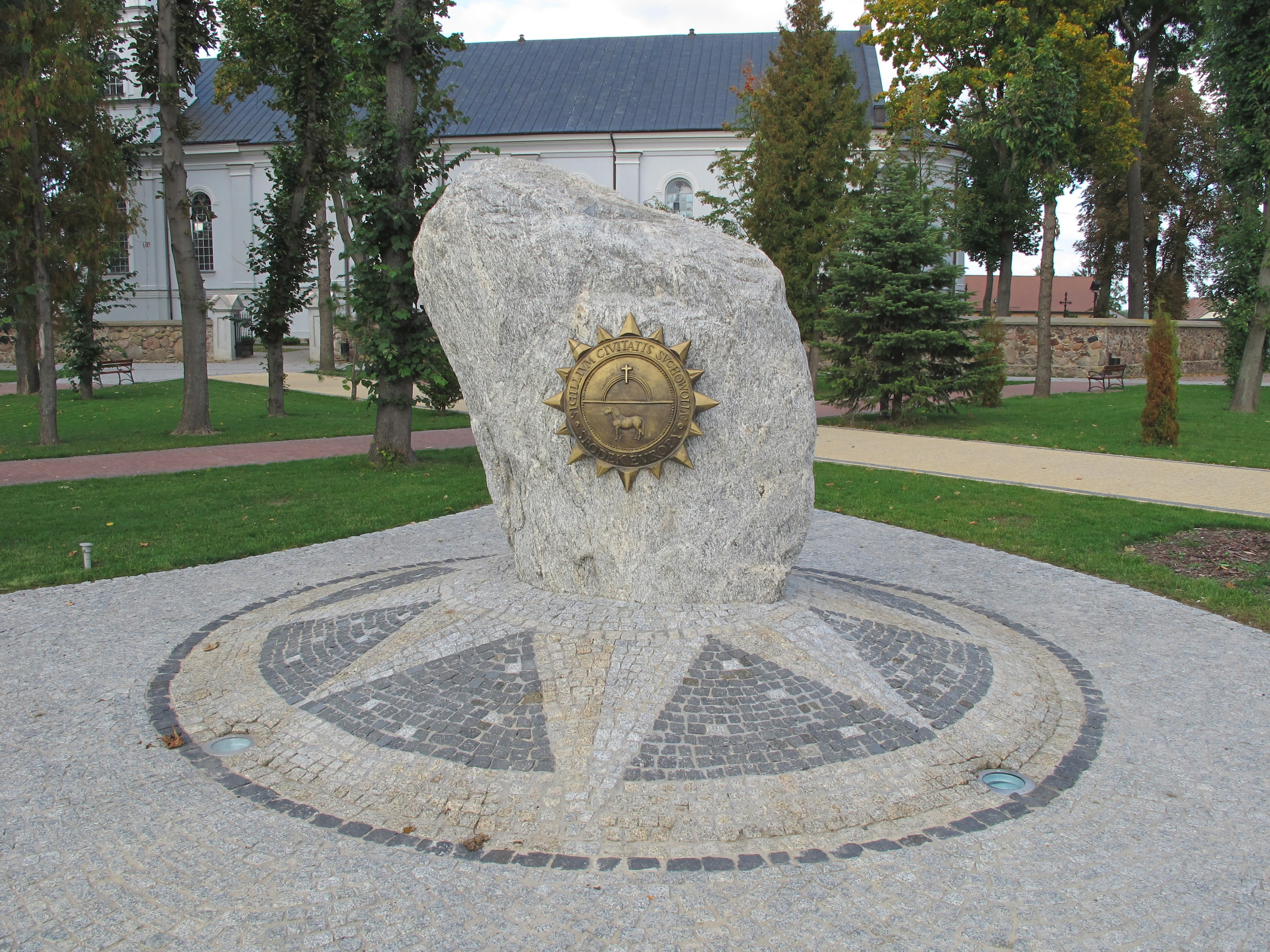
Monument in Suchowola, Poland

The first official declaration of the Centre of Europe was made in 1775 by the Polish royal astronomer and cartographer Szymon Antoni Sobiekrajski, who calculated it to be in the town of Suchowola near Białystok in modern north-eastern Poland. The method used was that of calculating equal distances from the extreme points of Europe: the westernmost point in Portugal; the easternmost point in the Central Urals; the northernmost point in Norway; and the southernmost point in Greece (islands were not taken into consideration). There is a monument commemorating that definition in Suchowola 53°34′39″N 23°06′22″E.

=== Slovakia ===
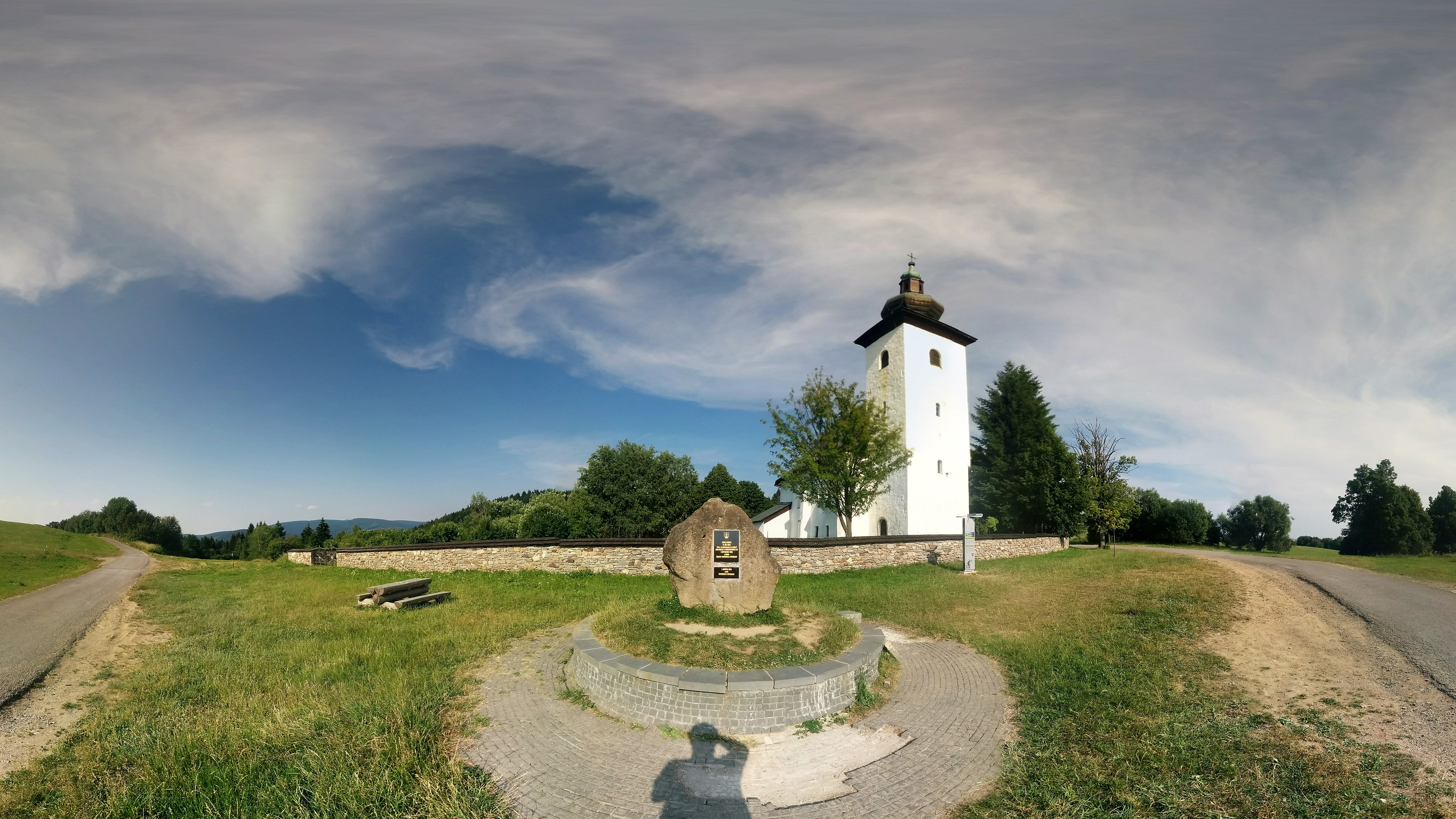
The marker stone in Kremnické Bane, Slovakia

In about 1815 there was a declaration that the centre of Europe was located near the mining town of Kremnica, on a hill that forms the water division between the basins of the Baltic Sea and Black Sea, near St. John Baptist Church. The method used for calculating is unknown, but from the description given on the commemorative plaque located near the church 48°44′37″N 18°55′50″E, it seems that it has been the centre of the smallest circle circumscribed on Europe (yet the limits of Europe taken into consideration are not known). The title of the "Centre of Europe" is also claimed by the neighbouring village Krahule (ancient Blaufuß), which used to belong to the same parish, now a famous centre for winter sports, with a hotel and recreation centre called "Stred Európy" ("Centre of Europe").

=== Ukraine ===
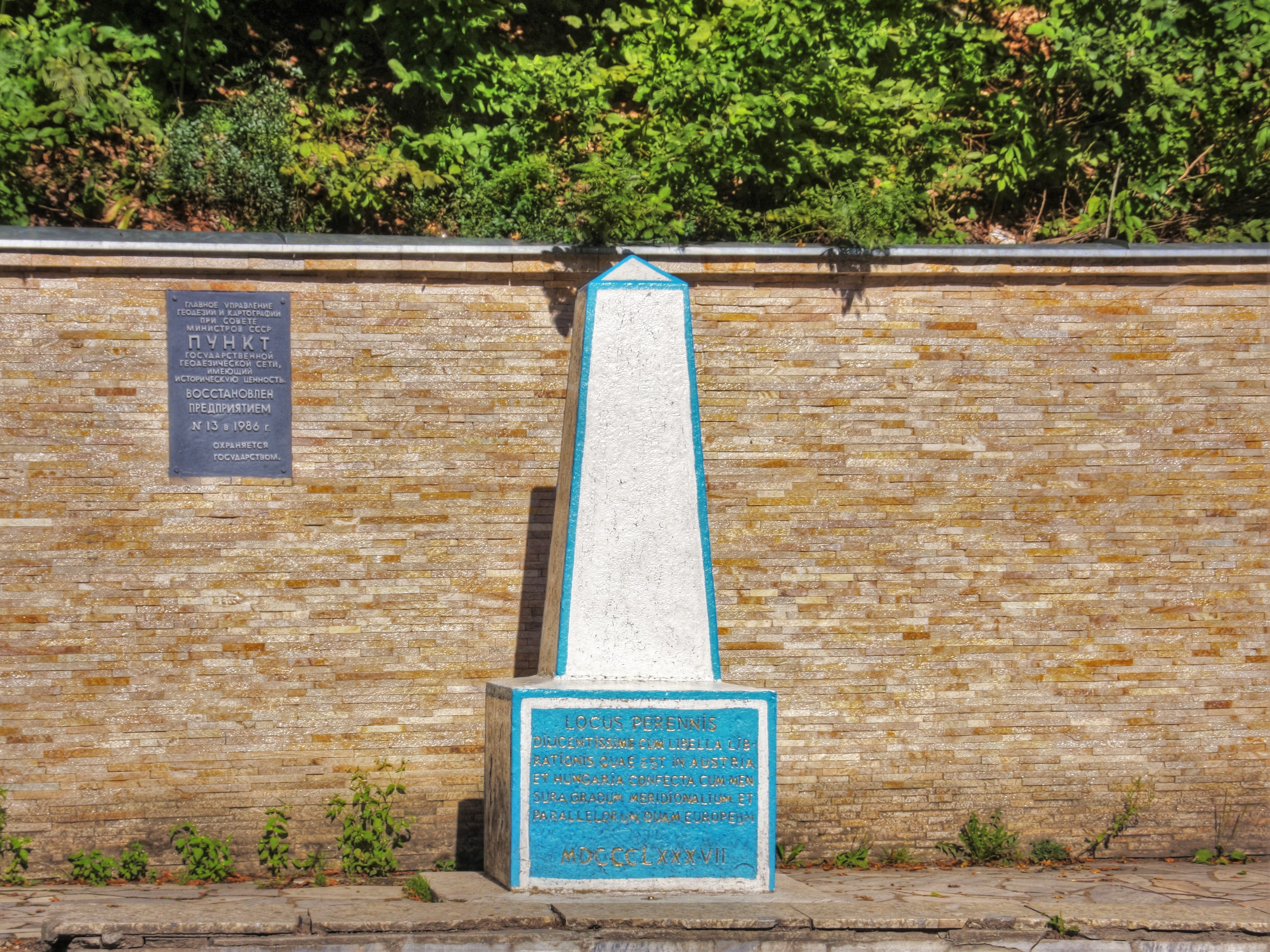
Austrian-Hungarian marker in Ukraine

In 1887, geographers from the Austro-Hungarian Empire set up a historical marker and a large stone in what is today a part of Ukraine, believed to mark the geographic centre of Europe. The interpretation of the worn Latin inscription on the monument is debated, with some claiming that the marker is merely one of a number of fixed triangulation points for surveying purposes established around the territory of the former empire. The external borders of Europe taken into account during the calculations are not known. According to the description, the methodology used for the calculation is that of the geometrical middle point of the extreme latitudes and longitudes of Europe, so the stone was located at 48°30′N 23°23′E. However, the actual location of the monument seems rather 47°57′46.47″N 24°11′14.4″E and not the coordinates to which they relate. This is near the village of Dilove located on the Tisza river, close to the Romanian border, in the county of Rakhiv in the Transcarpathian region.

==== Soviet measurements ====
Measurements done after World War II by Soviet scientists reconfirmed the Austria-Hungarian claim that Rakhiv and Dilove to be the geographical centre of Europe. The old marker in the small town was renewed, and a major campaign to convince everyone of its validity was undertaken.

=== Czech Republic ===
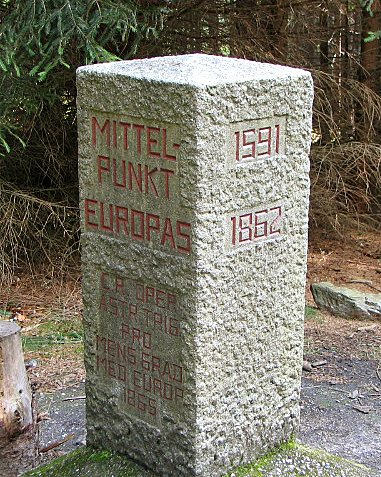
Marker near Tillenberg

Austrian geographers also marked the 939-metre-high Tillenberg (Dyleň) near the Bohemian city of Eger/Cheb with a copper plate as the centre of Europe. As the border to Germany/Bavaria runs 100 m west of the mountaintop, the German village of Bad Neualbenreuth uses this for promotional purposes. Bayerischer Rundfunk journalists asked the Institut für Geographie of LMU Munich to verify the claims. The institute concluded that the centre lies further to the south, in Hildweinsreuth near Flossenbürg.

=== Sweden ===
In 1988 using Spherical trigonometry with the three corners of Europe as Cabo de São Vincente in the west, Spitsbergen in the north and Astrakan in the east, Arne Wennberg calculated Landskrona as the midpoint of Europe. A monument is built on the town square in the form of a pen stuck in stone.

=== Lithuania ===
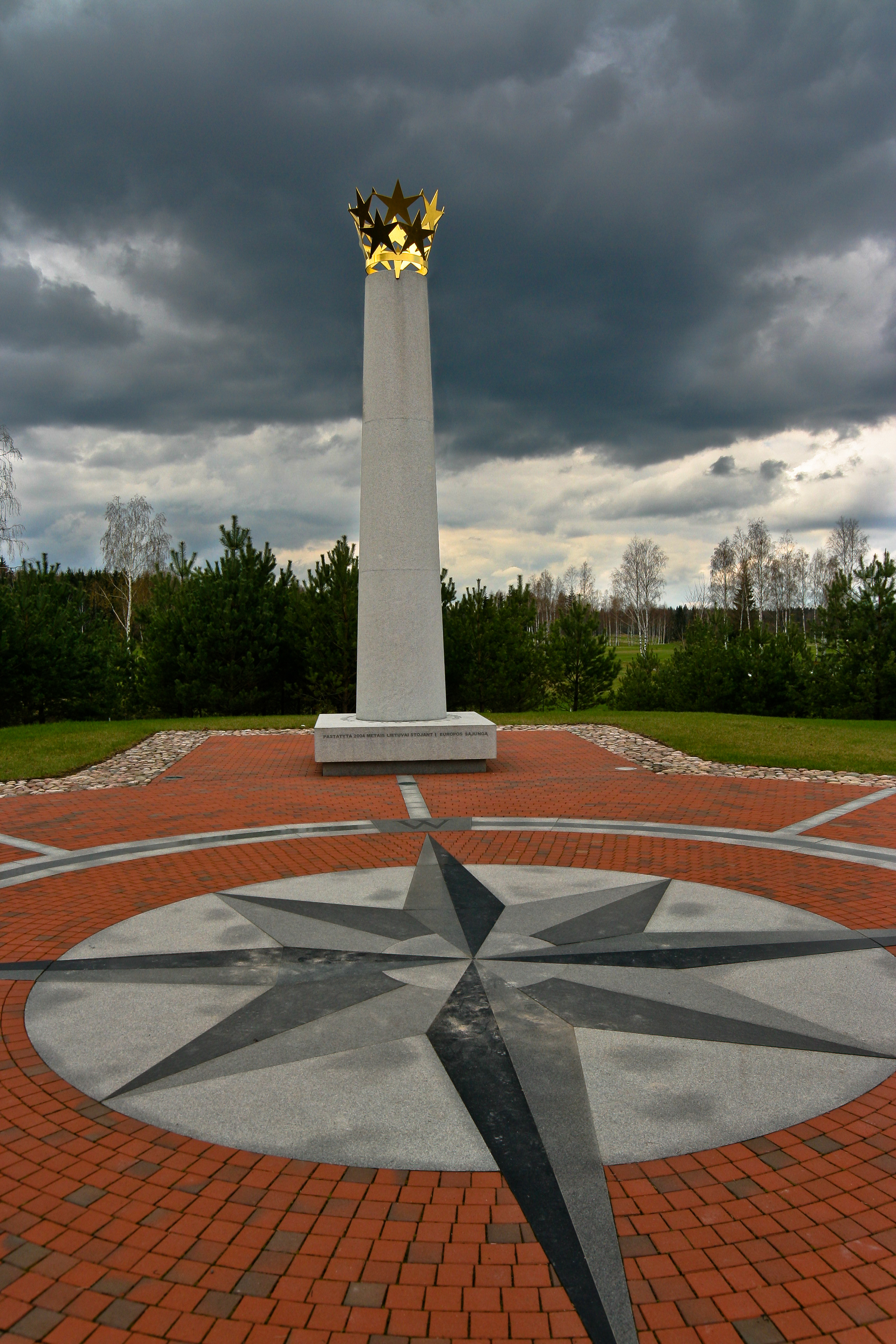
Monument in Girija, Lithuania

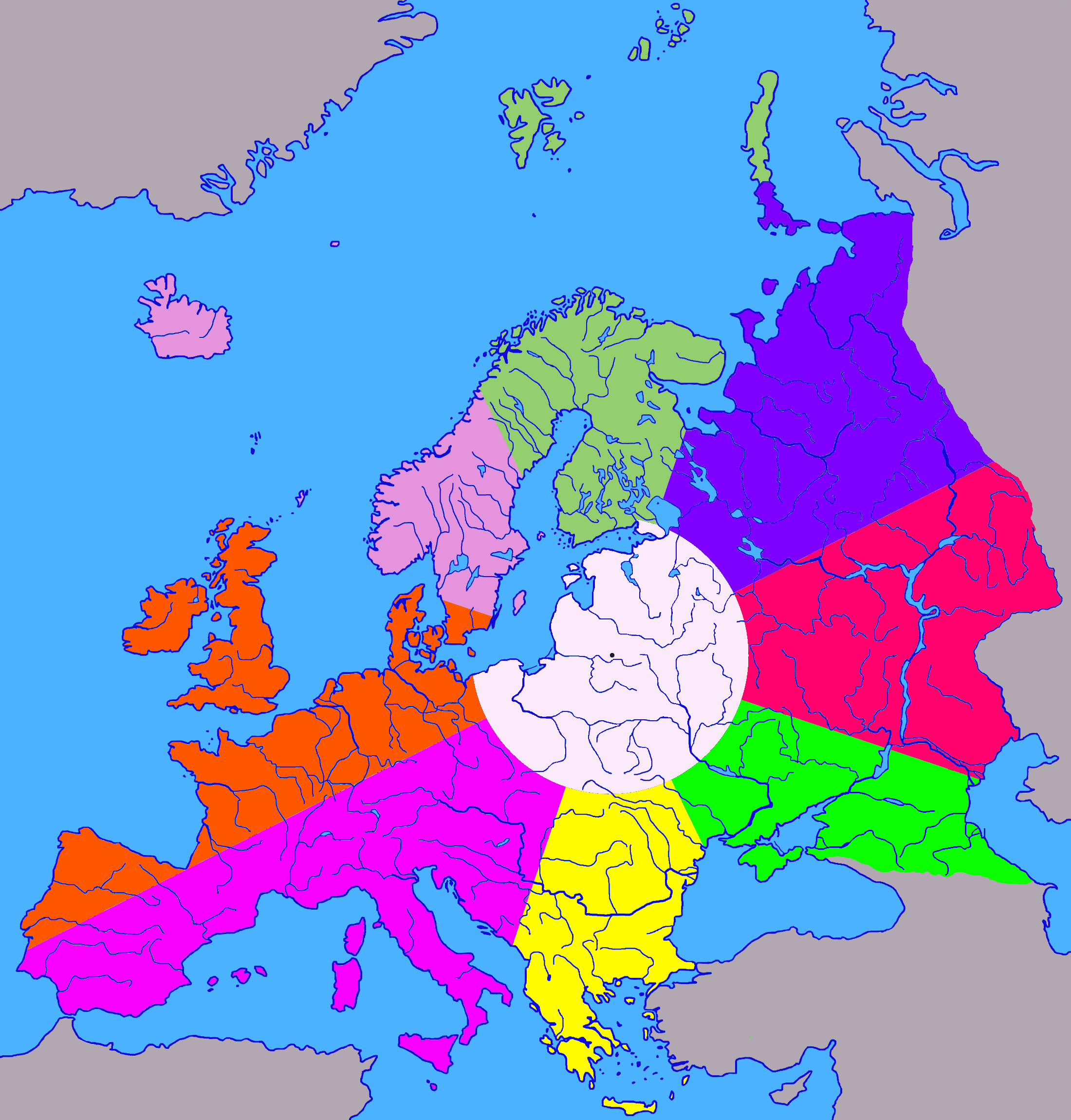
The division of Europe into the cardinal directions and the central part (with an area of 1/9 of Europe) from the geographical center in Lithuania

After a re-estimation of the boundaries of the continent of Europe in 1989, Jean-George Affholder, a scientist at the Institut Géographique National (French National Geographic Institute) determined that the geographic centre of Europe is located at 54°54′24″N 25°19′12″E. The method used for calculating this point was that of the centre of gravity of the geometrical figure of Europe. This point is located in Lithuania, near the village of Girija. A monument, composed by the sculptor Gediminas Jokūbonis and consisting of a column of white granite surmounted by a crown of stars, was erected at the location in 2004. An area of woods and fields surrounding the geographic centre point and including Lake Girija, Bernotai Hill, and an old burial ground, was set aside as a reserve in 1992. The State Tourism Department at the Ministry of Economy of Lithuania has classified the Geographic Centre monument and its reserve as a tourist attraction. 17 km away lies Europos Parkas, Open Air Museum of the Centre of Europe, a sculpture park containing the world's largest sculpture made of TV sets.

=== Hungary ===
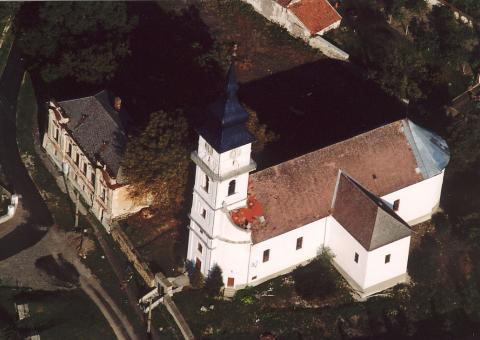
Church in Tállya

It is claimed that a 1992 survey found that the geometric centre of Europe is in the village of Tállya, Hungary 48.23610°N 21.22574°E. In 2000, a sculpture was erected in the village, with a table on it declaring the place the "Geometric Centre of Europe".

=== Belarus ===
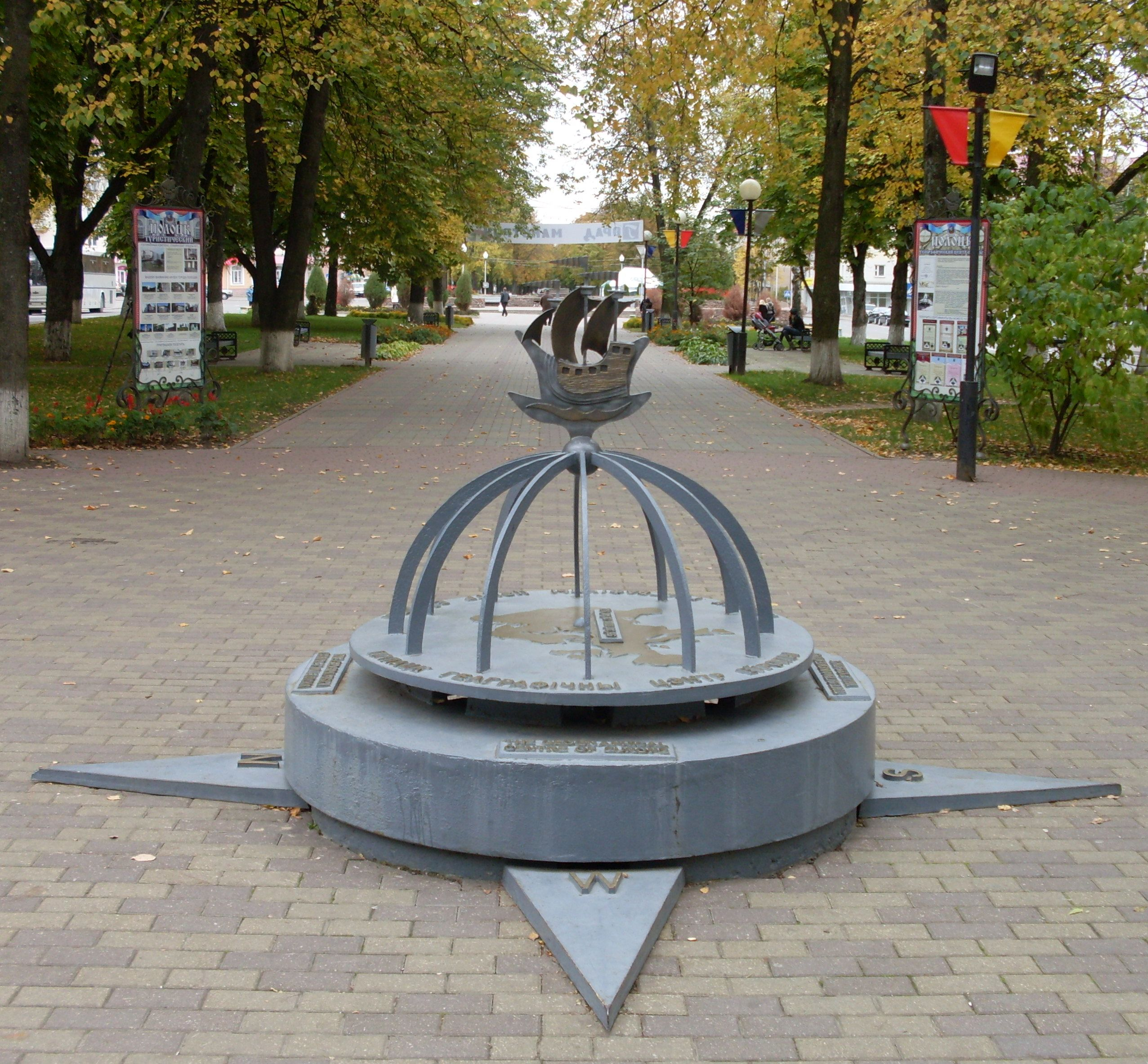
Monument to the Geographical Centre of Europe in Polotsk, Belarus

In 2000 Belarusian scientists Alexey Solomonov and Valery Anoshko published a report that stated the geographic centre of Europe was located near Lake Sho (55°10′55″N 28°15′30″E; Belarusian: Шо) in Vitebsk Region.

The scientists used a special computer program that takes Europe in a single entity – the White Sea and the Baltic Sea, Britain and Ireland were included in the program as continental zone objects. It is assumed that in the calculations to determine the center of Europe, one must take into account the inland waters of Europe and the Ural Mountains, the eastern border of Europe.

Scientists from the Russian Central Research Institute of Geodesy, Aerial Survey and Cartography (Russian: ЦНИИГАиК) confirmed the calculations of Belarusian geodesists that the geographical centre of Europe is located in Polotsk 55°30′0″N 28°48′0″E. A small monument to the Geographical Centre of Europe was set up in Polotsk on 31 May 2008.

=== Estonia ===
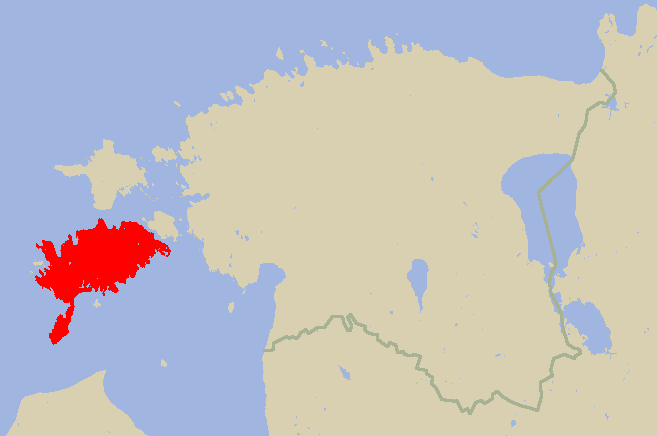
Saaremaa island in western Estonia

It is claimed that if all the islands of Europe – from the Azores to Franz Joseph Land and from Crete to Iceland – are taken into consideration then the centre of Europe lies at 58°18′14″N 22°16′44″E in the village of Mõnnuste, on Saaremaa island in western Estonia. Again, no author and no method of calculation have been disclosed. The local Kärla Parish is seeking to verify the location and to turn it into a tourist location.

== Geographic centre of the European Union ==
The French Institut Géographique National (IGN) has been calculating the changing location of what it estimates to be the geographical centre of the European Union (EU) since at least 1987. Its calculations exclude such extra-European territories of the EU as French Polynesia. As the European Union (or formerly – European Community) has grown in the last 50 years, the geographical centre has shifted with each expansion.

=== 1987–1990 ===
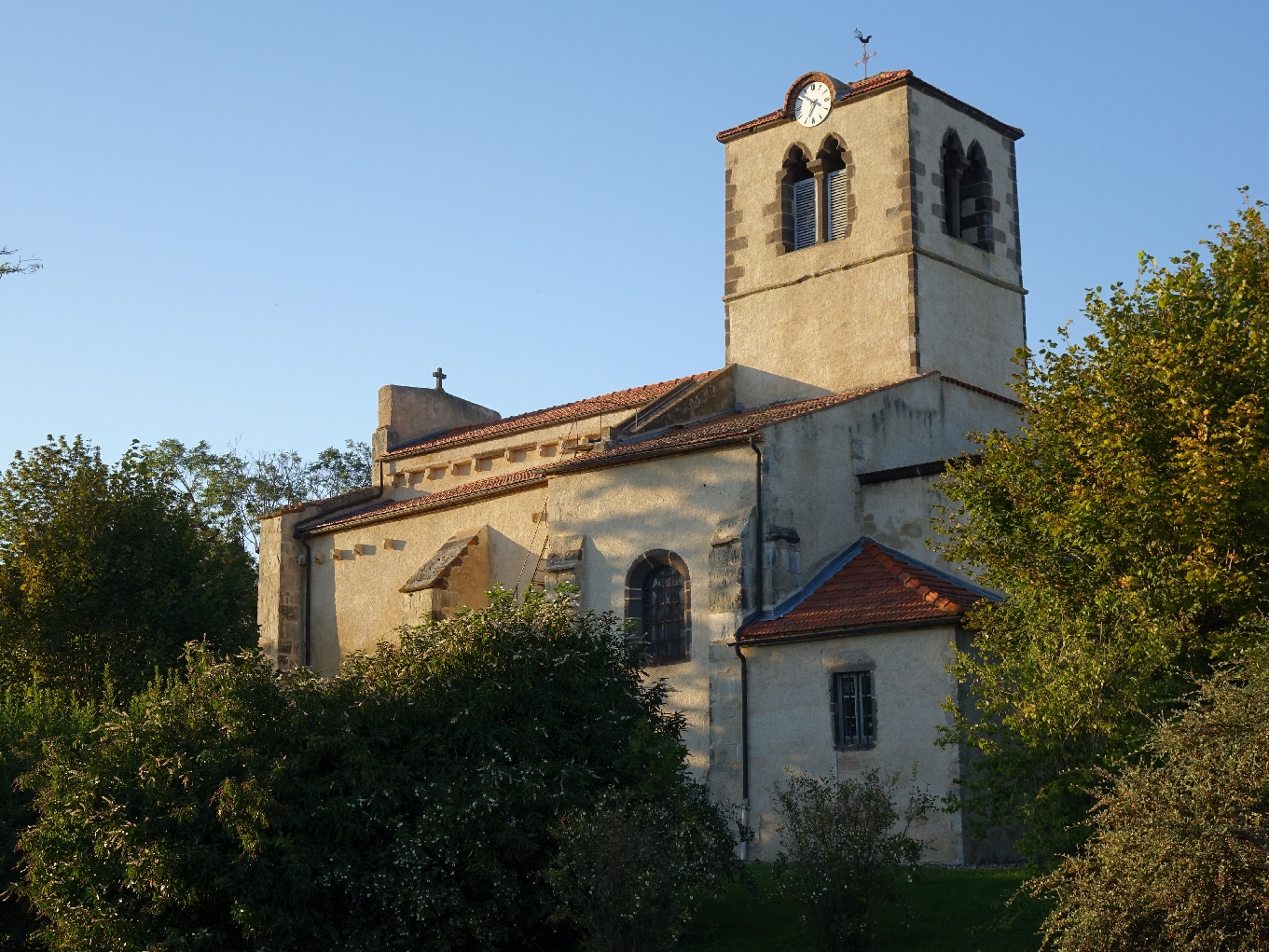
Church in Saint-André-le-Coq

12 members: In 1987 the centre of the European Community of the 12 members was declared to be in the middle of France, in the village of Saint-André-le-Coq, département of Puy-de-Dôme, région of Auvergne.

=== 1990–1995 ===
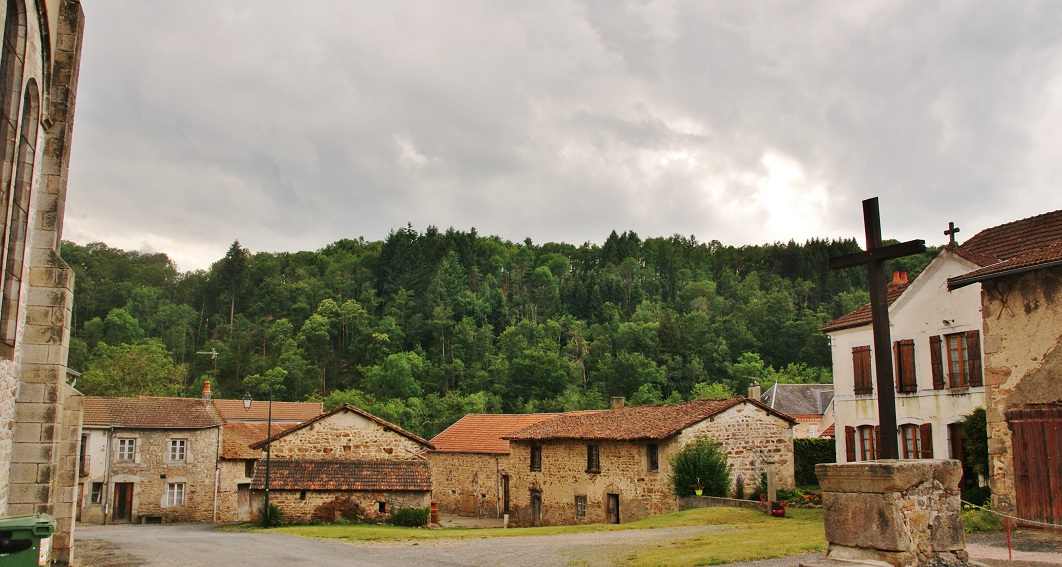
Village of Saint-Clément

12 members after the reunification of Germany. In 1990, the centre shifted some 25 km north-eastward, to the place called Noireterre in the village of Saint-Clément, département of Allier, the same région of Auvergne. A small monument commemorating the latter discovery still exists in Saint Clément.

=== 1995–2004 ===
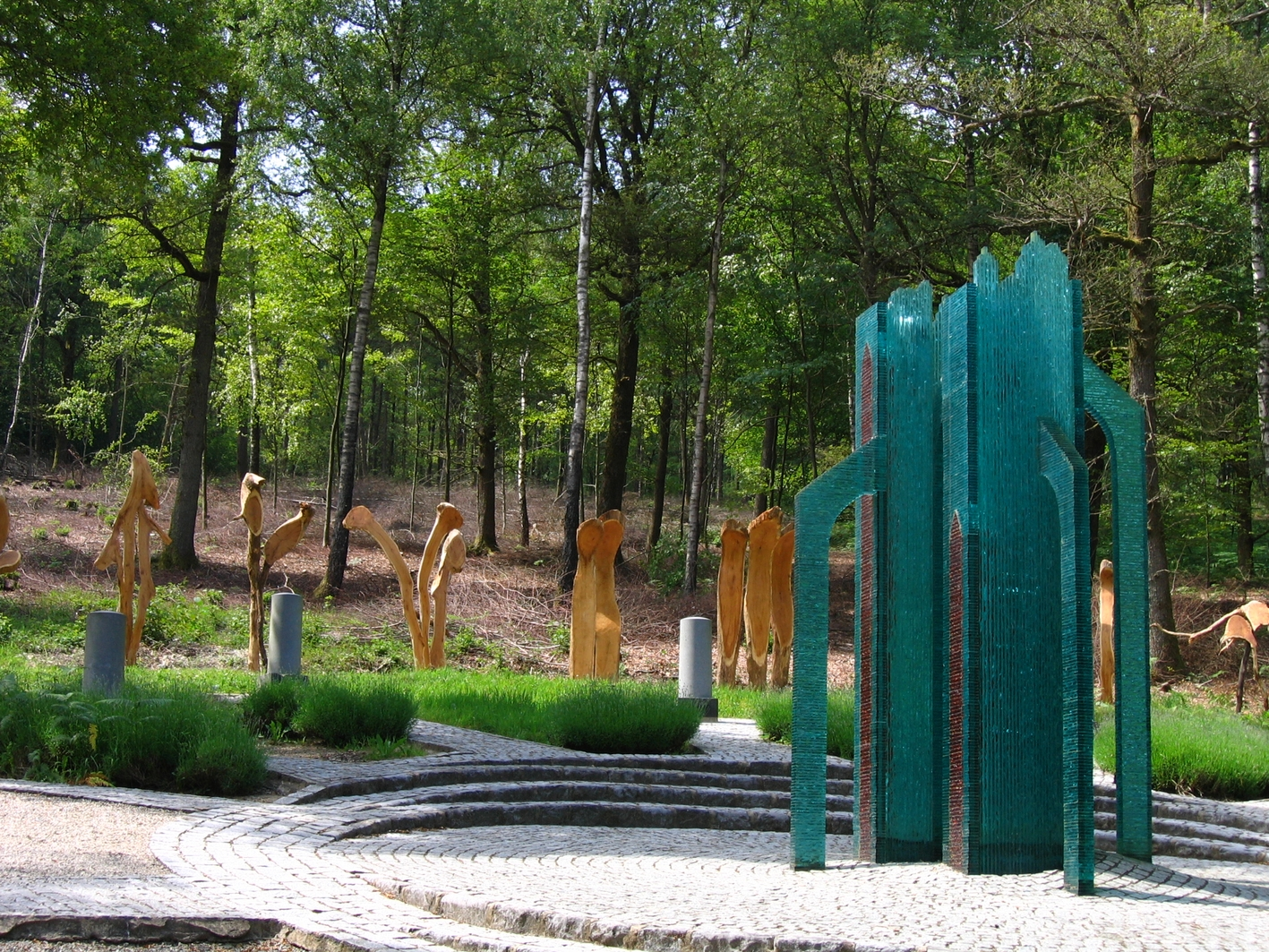
Memorial at Viroinval (15-member-EU)

15 members: Using the same techniques, the IGN has identified the geographic centre of the 15-member Union (1995–2004) to be in Viroinval, Belgium, at coordinates 50°00′33″N 4°39′59″E, and a monument there records that finding.

=== 2004–2007 ===
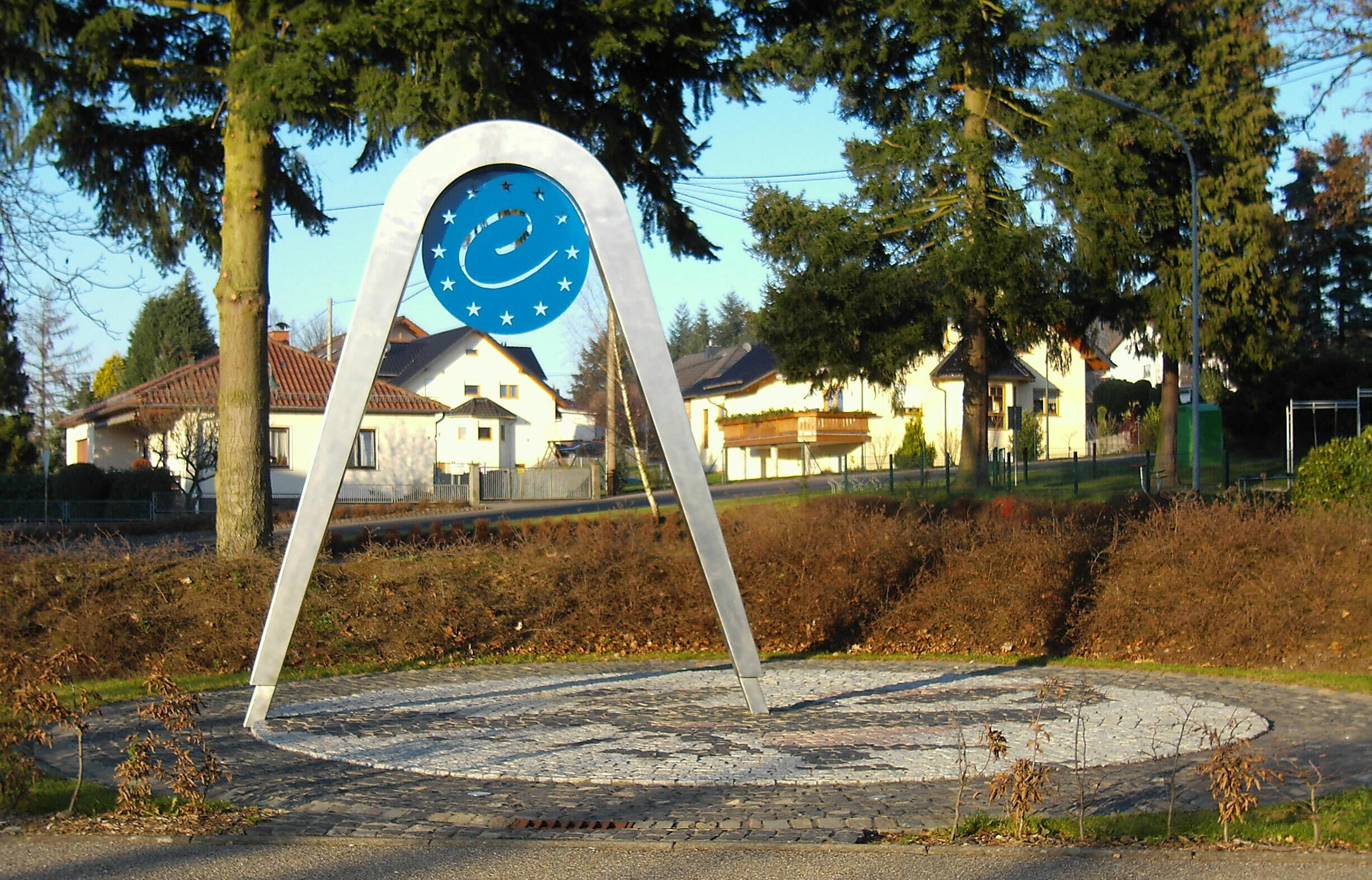
Memorial at Kleinmaischeid (25-member-EU)

25 members: The 25-member Union (2004–2007), had a centre calculated by the IGN to be situated at 50°31′31″N 7°35′50″E, in the village of Kleinmaischeid, Rhineland-Palatinate, Germany.

=== 2007–2013 ===
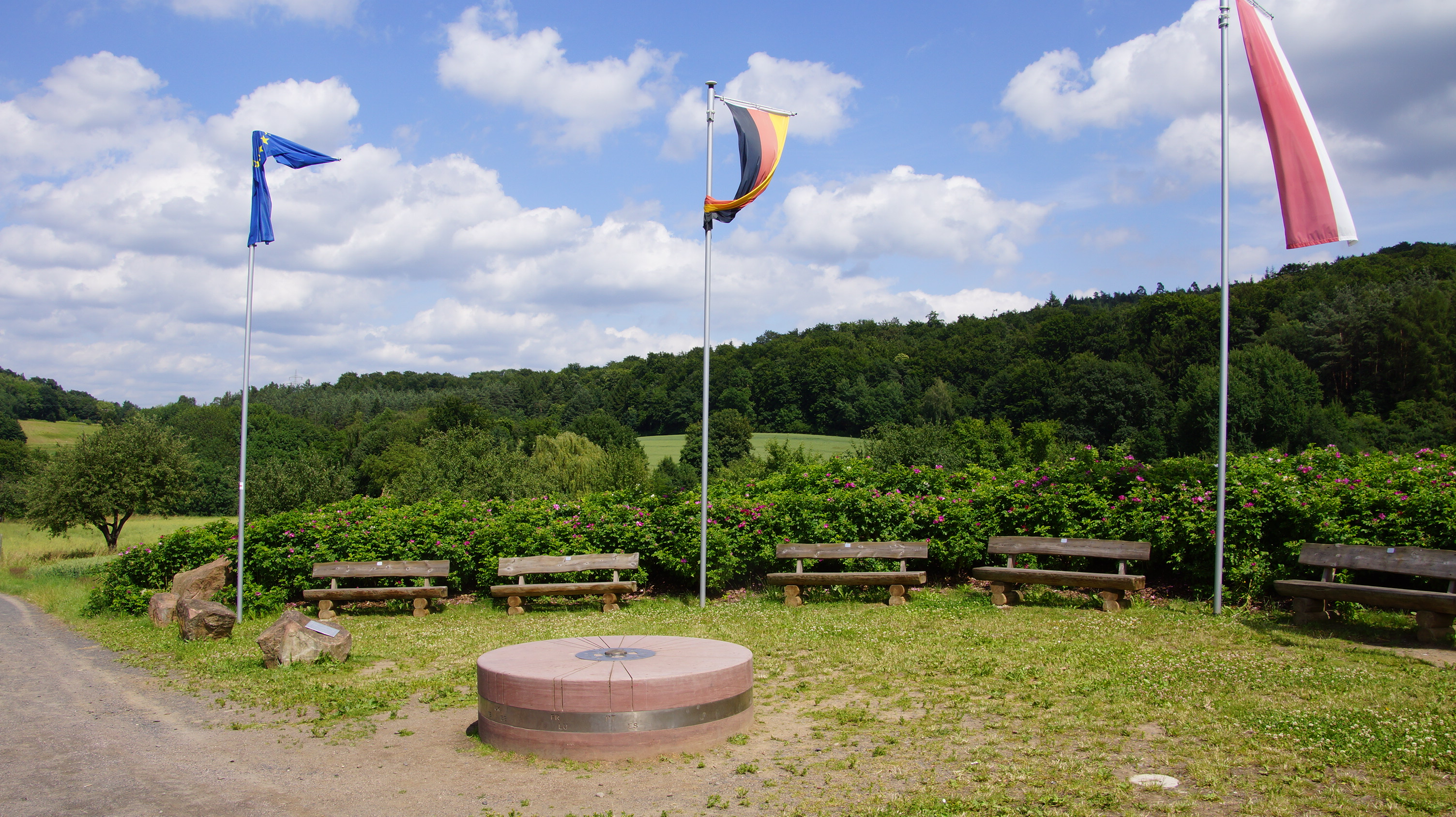
Memorial at Gelnhausen-Meerholz (27-member-EU)

27 members: On 1 January 2007, with the inclusion of Romania and Bulgaria in the European Union, the geographic centre of the European Union changed to a wheat field outside of the German town Gelnhausen, in the state of Hesse, 115 km east of the previous marker, at 50°10′21″N 9°9′0″E.

=== 2013–2020 ===
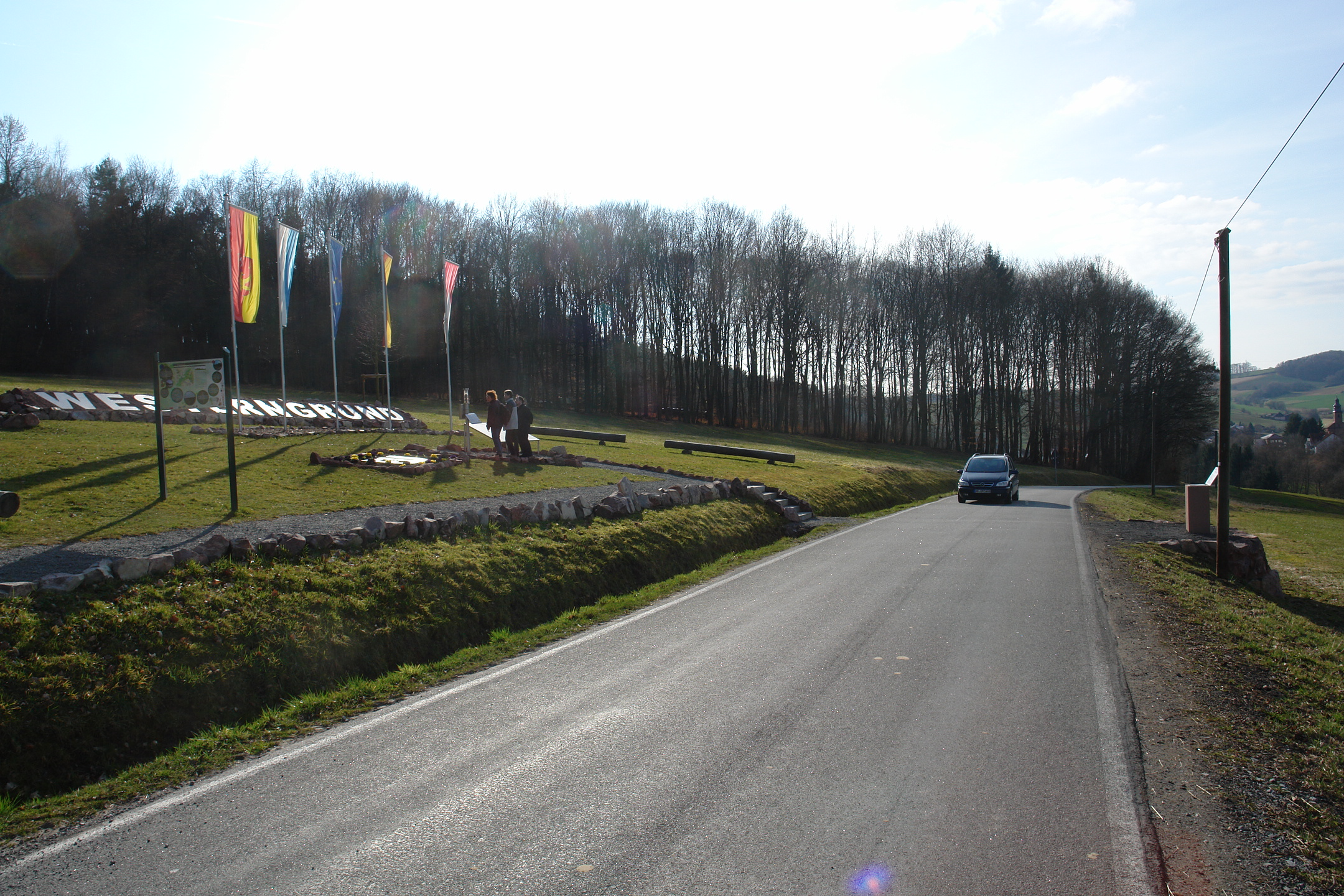
Geographical centre of the 28-member European Union including Mayotte (from 10 May 2014) in Westerngrund, Bavaria

28 members: On 1 July 2013, with the accession of Croatia, the geographic centre entered North-West Bavaria in the place Westerngrund at the river Schulzengrundbach at 50°7′2.23″N 9°14′51.97″E. When the French overseas department Mayotte (Indian Ocean island group between Southeast African mainland and Madagascar) joined the EU on 10 May 2014 (as part of France), the geographic center shifted by 500 m to 50°6′8.004″N 9°15′15.91″E, still at Westerngrund, beside a path. It is 40 km east of Frankfurt, Germany, which is headquarters to the European Central Bank.

=== 2020–present ===
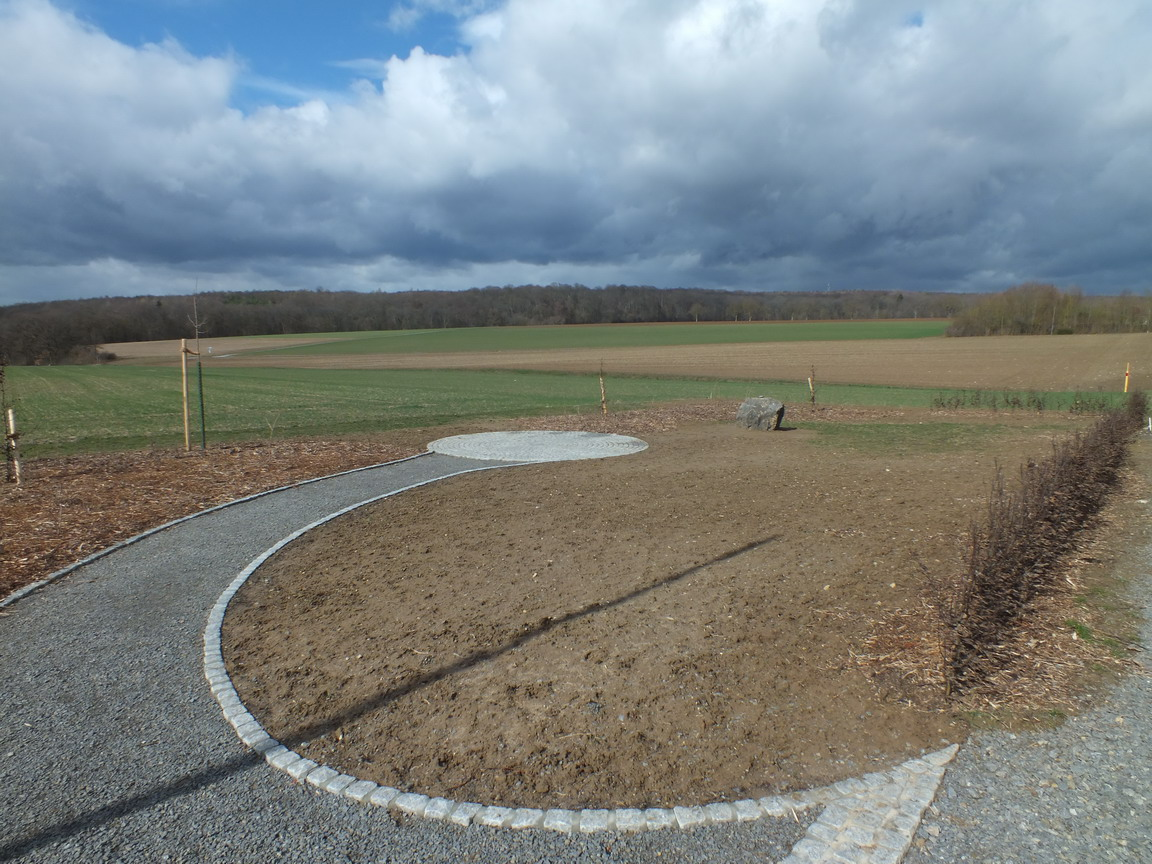
Gadheim, Bavaria

27 members after Brexit: On 31 January 2020, with the withdrawal of the United Kingdom from the EU, the geographical mid-point moved to Gadheim near Würzburg, Bavaria, at 49°50′34.8″N 9°54′07.4″E.

=== Other calculations ===
The geographical midpoint of the European Union is not free from disputes either. If some different extreme points of the European Union, like some Atlantic Ocean islands, are taken into consideration this point is calculated in different locations.

=== Eurozone ===
The original centre of the Eurozone is located in France. This location has changed with the accession of new countries into the Eurozone (e.g. Slovakia 2009 and Bulgaria 2026).

== Human-geographic centers of gravity ==
Human-geographic centers of gravity are subject to constant shift. The center of European population has been placed somewhere in southern Germany, with the center of gravity of urban population having shifted significantly over the centuries. The economic center of Europe has been calculated to have wandered since 1950 from western to southern Germany, most recently towards south-eastern Germany, while the ecenomic center of Europe by institution has been Frankfurt, with the seat of the European Central Bank, seated at one of Europe's cities with the largest capital markets.

== See also ==
- Central Europe
- Centroid
- Intermediate Region
- Geography of Europe
- Extreme points of the European Union
- Geographical centre of Earth
