= Keer =

The River Keer is a river in north west England.

Keer might also refer to:

- Anant Viththal Keer (pen name "Dhananjay Keer"), biographer from Maharashtra, India
- Caroline Keer, a British military nurse and nursing administrator
- Girija Keer, a Marathi writer from Maharashtra, India
- Leon Keer, a Dutch pop-surrealist artist
- Leon M. Keer (1934–2021), American engineer
- Kheer, a type of pudding from the Indian subcontinent
