= European Centre Golf Club =

Golf club in Lithuania

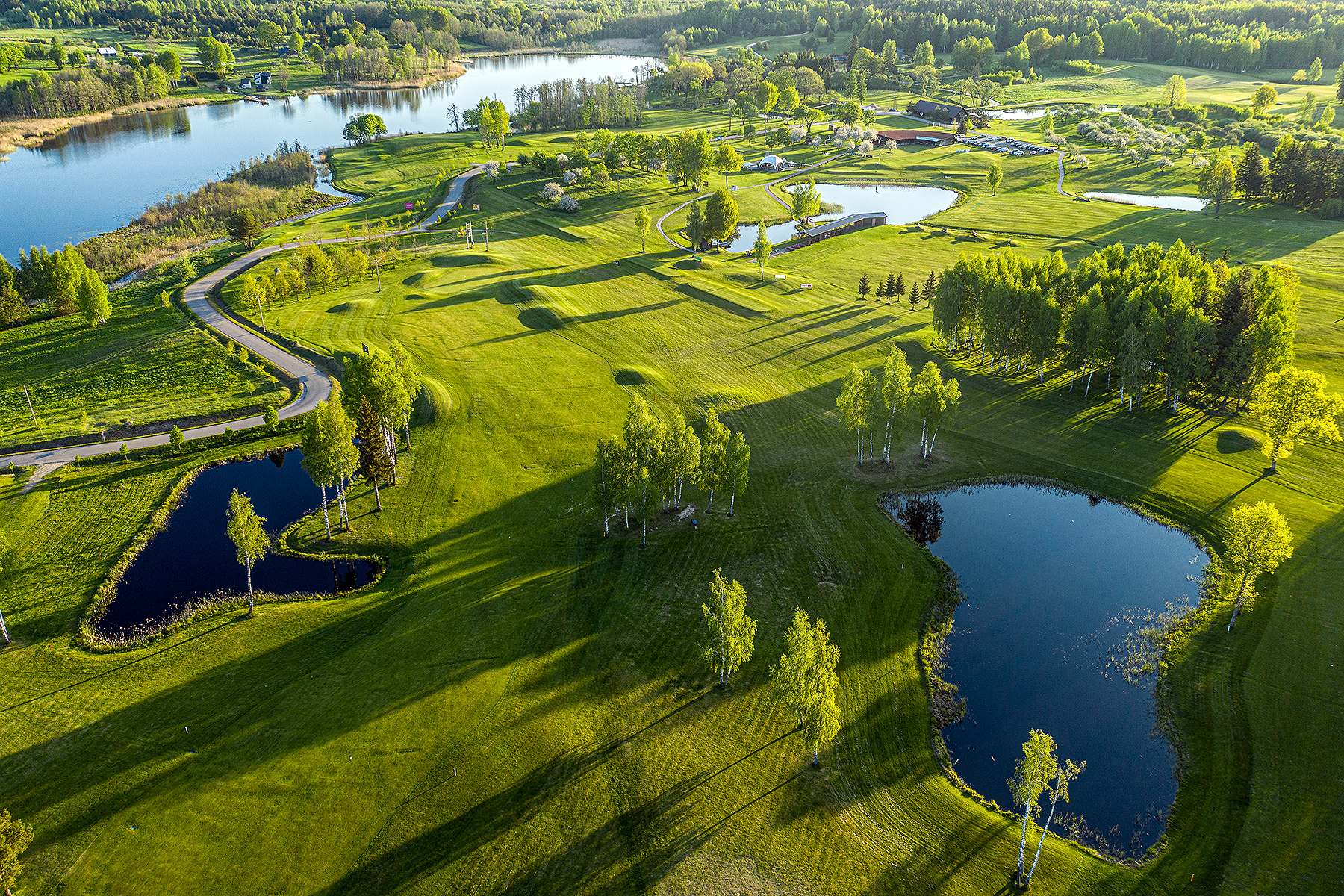
- Interactive map of European Centre Golf Club
- 54°54′24″N 25°19′3″E

Club information
- Location: Girija, Lithuania
- Established: 2005
- Owner: ERGOLAIN
- Total holes: 18
- Website: golfclub.lt

European Centre Golf Club is a golf club and course in Girija, Vilnius District Municipality.

The golf club was established in 2005 next to the geographical midpoint of Europe. During the winter the golf club becomes a 5 km cross-country skiing track.
