= Lipová (Cheb District) =

- Municipality
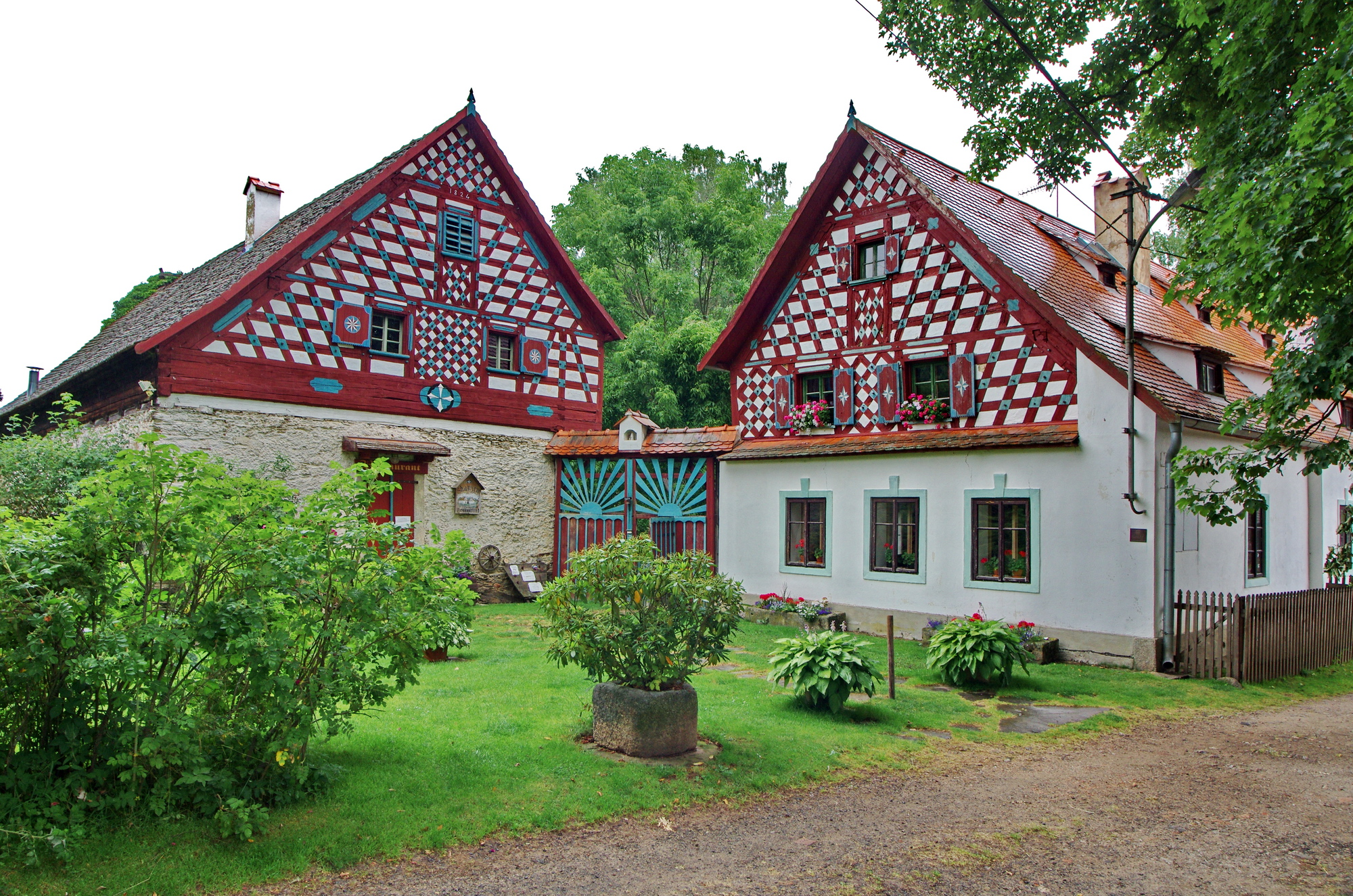
- Folk architecture houses in Doubrava

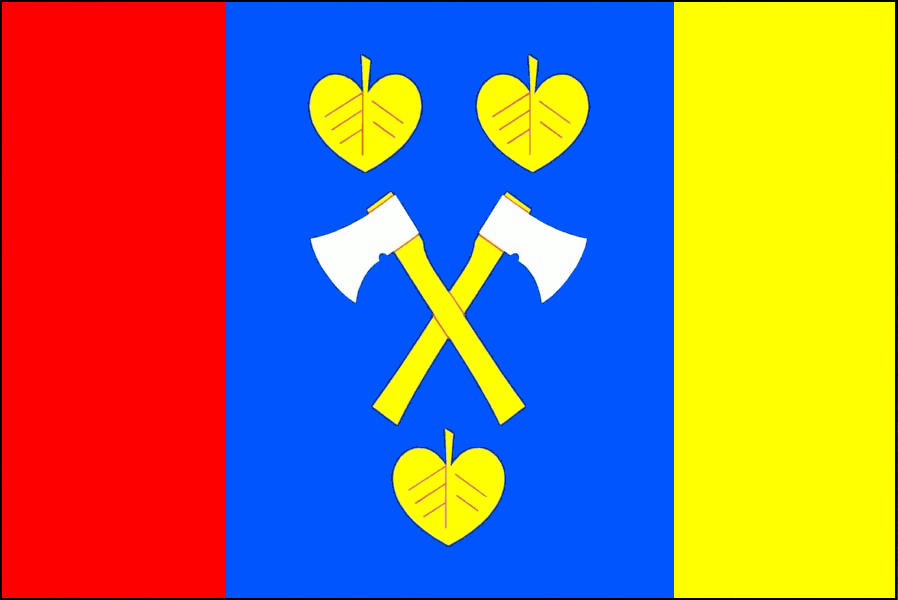
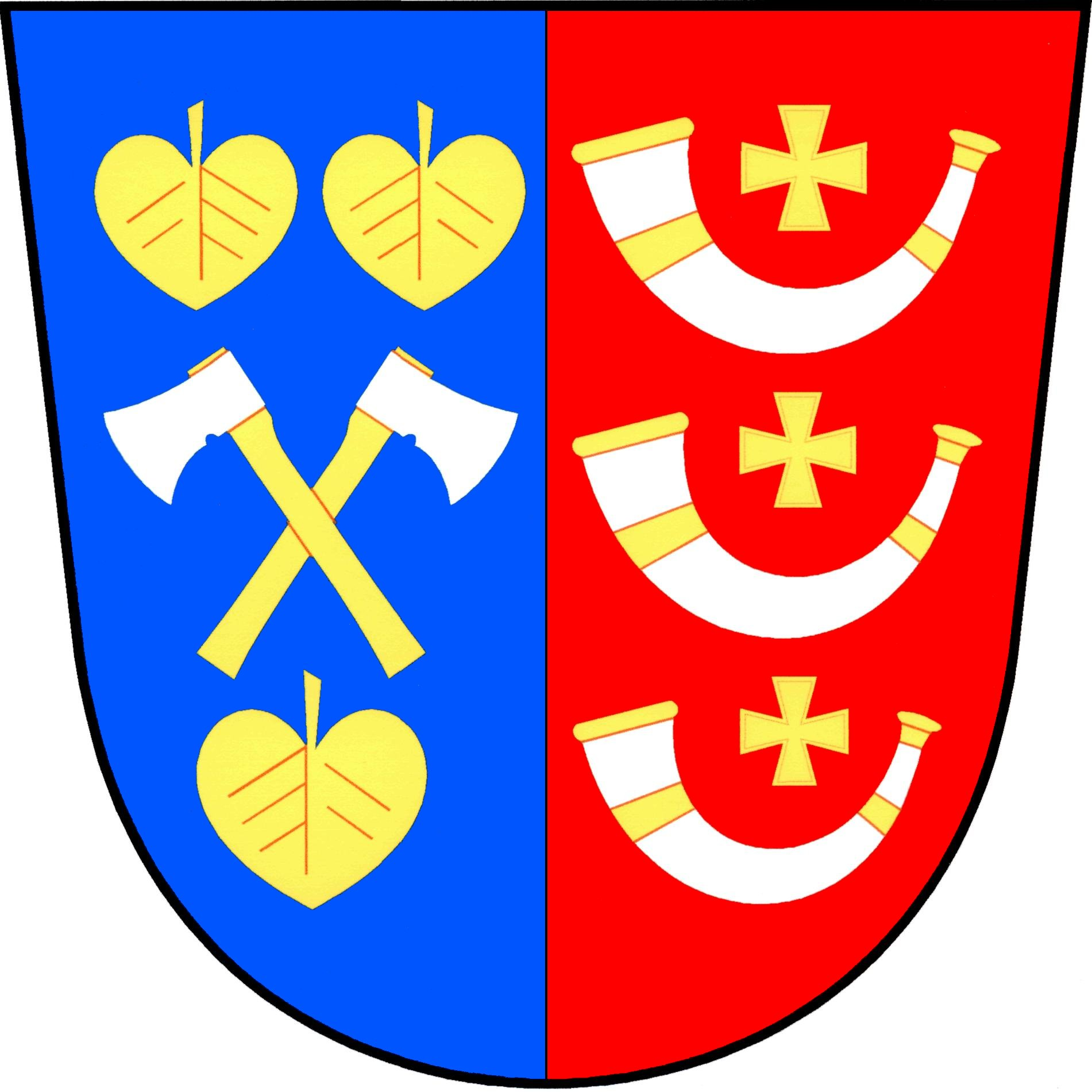
- Flag Coat of arms

- Location in the Czech Republic
- Coordinates: 50°2′11″N 12°26′56″E
- Country: Czech Republic
- Region: Karlovy Vary
- District: Cheb
- First mentioned: 1473

Area
  - Total: 45.76 km^{2} (17.67 sq mi)
- Elevation: 506 m (1,660 ft)

Population (2026-01-01)
  - Total: 752
  - Density: 16.4/km^{2} (42.6/sq mi)
- Time zone: UTC+1 (CET)
  - Summer (DST): UTC+2 (CEST)
- Postal code: 350 02
- Website: www.lipovauchebu.cz

Lipová (German: Lindenhau) is a municipality and village in Cheb District in the Karlovy Vary Region of the Czech Republic. It has about 800 inhabitants.

== Administrative division ==
Lipová consists of nine municipal parts (in brackets population according to the 2021 census):

- Lipová (321)
- Dolní Lažany (28)
- Dolní Lipina (33)
- Doubrava (44)
- Horní Lažany (35)
- Mechová (46)
- Mýtina (28)
- Palič (92)
- Stebnice (57)

== Etymology ==
Until 1948, the German name Lindenhau (meaning 'linden glade') was used both in Czech and German. In 1948, it was renamed Lipová (an adjective from the Czech word lípa, i.e. 'linden').

== Geography ==
Lipová is located about 6 kilometres (4 mi) southeast of Cheb and 35 km (22 mi) southwest of Karlovy Vary, on the border with Germany. The northern part of the municipality lies in the Cheb Basin. The southern part extends into the Fichtel Mountains and the southeastern part into the Upper Palatine Forest. The highest point is located on the southeastern municipal border, on the slopes of the Dyleň mountain, at 825 m (2,707 ft) above sea level. The northern municipal border is formed by the Jesenice Reservoir, built on the Wondreb river.

Near the village of Mýtina is the Železná hůrka National Nature Monument with an extinct Quaternary volcano.

== History ==
The first written mention of Lipová is from 1473. In 1960, the municipalities of Lipová, Mýtina and Palič were merged.

== Demographics ==
Historical population

Year	Pop.	±%
1869	2,191	—
1880	2,084	−4.9%
1890	1,848	−11.3%
1900	1,840	−0.4%
1910	1,870	+1.6%

Year	Pop.	±%
1921	1,816	−2.9%
1930	1,983	+9.2%
1950	837	−57.8%
1961	789	−5.7%
1970	606	−23.2%

Year	Pop.	±%
1980	556	−8.3%
1991	546	−1.8%
2001	562	+2.9%
2011	654	+16.4%
2021	684	+4.6%

Source: Censuses

== Transport ==
Lipová is located on the railway line Plzeň–Karlovy Vary.

== Sights ==
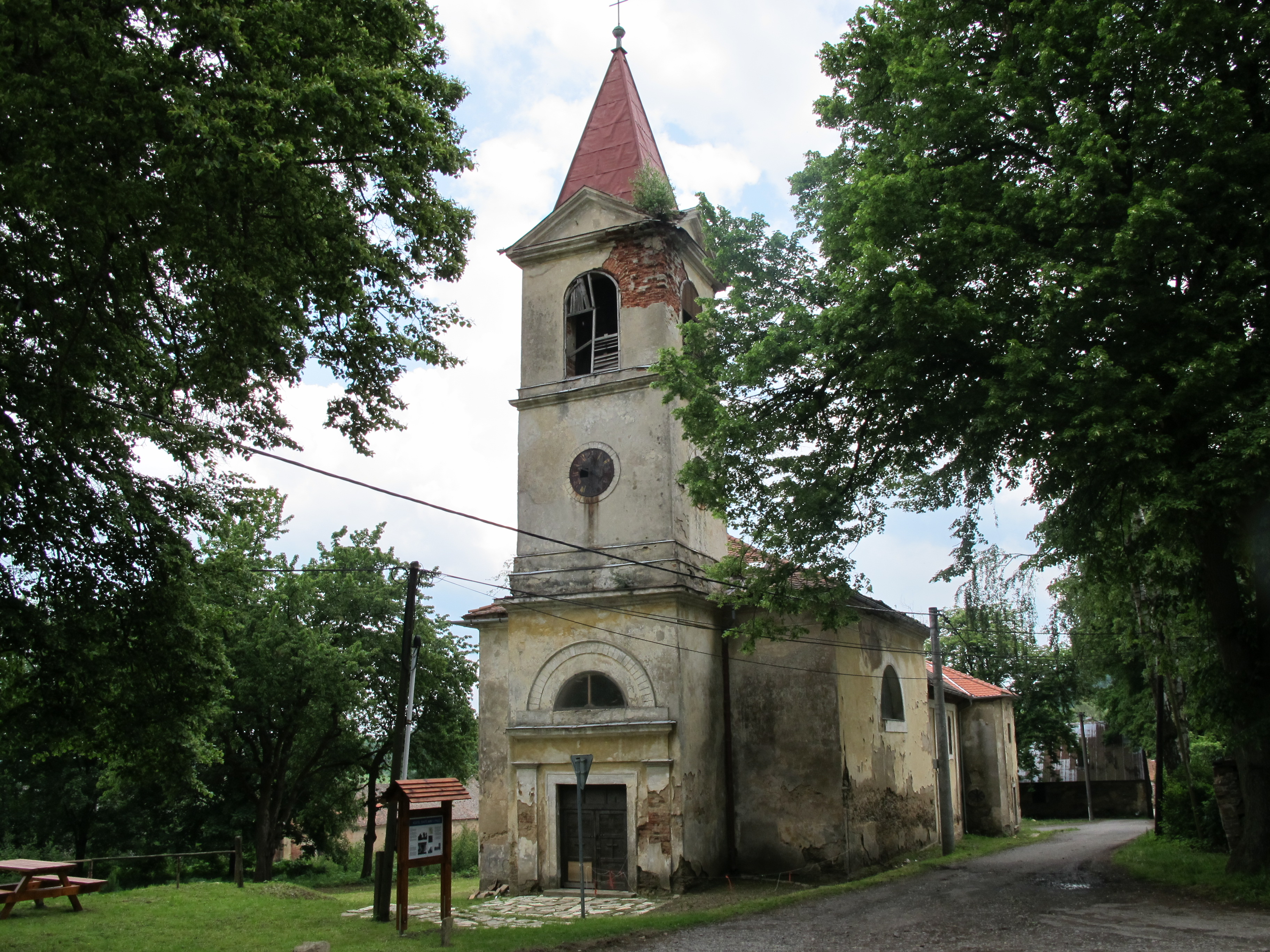
Church of Saint Anne

The village of Doubrava is a well-preserved set of half-timbered, timbered and brick buildings, dating from the 18th and 19th centuries. They are an example of folk architecture typical for this region. For its value, the village is protected as a village monument reservation. For similar reasons, the village of Dolní Lažany is protected as a village monument zone.

The Church of Saint Anne is located in Palič. It was built in the late Baroque style in 1751–1756. In the following years, it was rebuilt in the Neoclassical style into its present form.
