= Gadheim =

- Ortsteil of Veitshöchheim
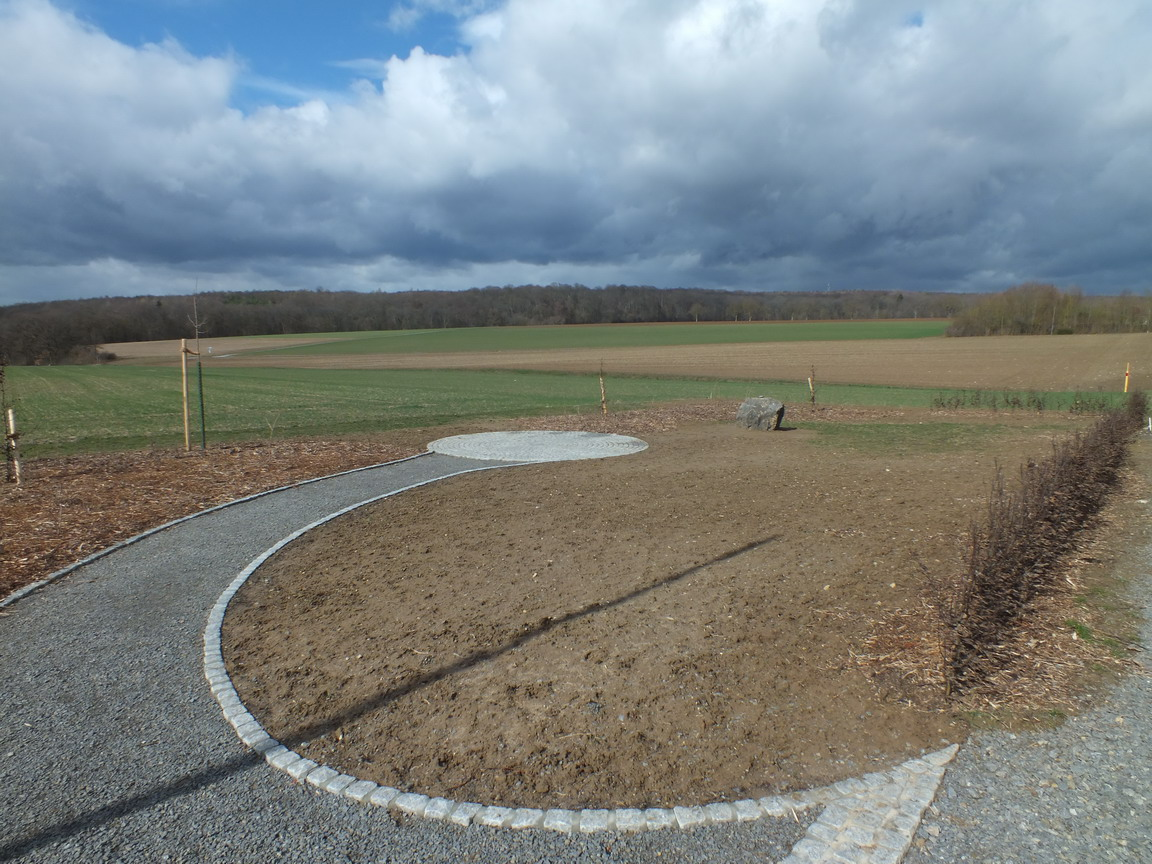
- The Center of post Brexit EU near Gadheim.
- Interactive map of Gadheim
- Location within Germany Location within Bavaria
- Coordinates: 49°50′44″N 9°54′22″E
- Country: Germany
- State: Bavaria
- Admin. region: Lower Franconia
- District: Würzburg
- Municipality: Veitshöchheim

Population (1987)
  - Total: 80
- Time zone: UTC+01:00 (CET)
  - Summer (DST): UTC+02:00 (CEST)

Gadheim is a village in Lower Franconia, in northern Bavaria belonging to the municipality of Veitshöchheim. It is located about 10 kilometers (6.2 miles) north of Würzburg. As of 31 January 2020, Gadheim is the site of the geodetic center of the European Union.
