= Kremnica =

Town in Slovakia

Kremnica Körmöcbánya
- Municipality
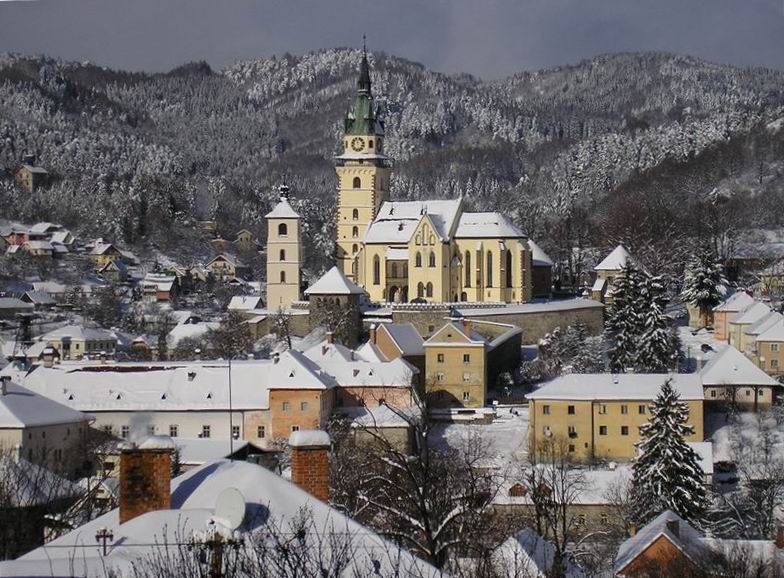
- Winter in Kremnica

- Flag Coat of arms

- Location of Kremnica in the Banská Bystrica Region Location of Kremnica in Slovakia
- Coordinates: 48.70°N 18.92°E
- Country: Slovakia
- Region: Banská Bystrica Region
- District: Žiar nad Hronom District
- First mentioned: 1328

Government
  - Mayor: Martin Novodomec (KDH)

Area
  - Total: 46.79 km^{2} (18.07 sq mi)
- (2022)
- Elevation: 564 m (1,850 ft)

Population (2025)
  - Total: 4,586

Population by ethnicity (2011)
  - Slovak: 87.5%
  - Roma: 1.1%
  - German: 0.8%
  - Czech: 0.5%
  - Others: 0.4%
  - Unreported: 9.7%

Population by religion (2011)
  - Roman Catholic: 53.9%
  - Lutheran: 4.6%
  - Greek Catholic: 0.4%
  - Congregationalist: 0.4%
  - Others: 0.6%
  - Non-religious: 24%
  - Unreported: 16.1%
- Time zone: UTC+1 (CET)
  - Summer (DST): UTC+2 (CEST)
- Postal code: 967 01
- Area code: +421 45
- Vehicle registration plate (until 2022): ZH
- Website: www.kremnica.sk

Kremnica (German: Kremnitz, Hungarian: Körmöcbánya) is a town in central Slovakia. It has around 5,300 inhabitants. The well-preserved medieval town built above important gold mines is the site of the oldest still-working mint in the world.

== Name ==
The name is derived from Slovak kremeň, kremenina (quartz) with a feminine suffix -ica, functioning to create local names.

== History ==
Kremnica was among the major mining towns of the world during the Middle Ages and in the modern era due to the abundant gold ore deposits in the Kremnica Mountains. However, the first evidence of sub-surface mining activities comes from the 9th century.

In the 13th century the inhabitants of this area were affected by the invasion of the Mongols. Following that difficult period, Hungarian kings invited new colonists from present-day Germany (more specifically Carpathian Germans/Zipser Germans) to settle in the region to help replenish the decimated population. Their innovative technology and knowledge restored the mining activities in the town. The first written reference to the town dates back to 1328, when it was granted royal town privileges by King Charles I of Hungary.

The town's mint was already in existence at the time of the granting of royal privileges. Starting in 1335 the mint produced golden florins and later the famous "Kremnica ducats", which were used as an international means of payment as a result of their consistently high purity of gold. It was the most important mint, and later the only one, in the Kingdom of Hungary, in Czechoslovakia and nowadays in Slovakia; the prosperity brought to the town led to it being given the nickname "Golden Kremnica".

In 1331, Kremnica became the seat of the Chamber Count (German: Kammergraf) who was the head of the most important mining and minting chamber of the Kingdom of Hungary. The Count administered all the mines and mints in twelve counties of the kingdom in the Middle Ages.

At the end of the 14th century, Kremnica became the capital of the mining towns in central Upper Hungary. The steady annual production of gold and silver guaranteed the prosperous development of the town. In the 15th century Kremnica was the second most important city in the Kingdom of Hungary. The town was continuously being granted new privileges and the deputies of the town occupied the second place in the Hungarian Diet (the first place was reserved for the representatives of Buda, the capital of the Kingdom). The population reached 10,000 in the 1840s.

Gold mining and coin production in Kremnica culminated in the 14th and 15th centuries. As one of the most important centers of Protestant Reformation in the country, the town belonged to the Protestant "League of Seven Mining Towns" together with Banská Belá, Banská Bystrica, Banská Štiavnica, Ľubietová, Nová Baňa, and Pukanec. In the 16th century, the town was a major centre of production of (mostly religious) medals, especially by Joachim Deschler. At the same time however, the miners had to dig deeper and deeper to reach new deposits and the mining conditions deteriorated because of underground water in the shafts. The cost of mining increased and the mining was becoming less profitable. The last gold was extracted in Kremnica in 1970, at which time all the mines were closed. The German population of the town and its surroundings was expelled in 1945 as the consequential punishment by the former Czechoslovak government after World War II.

== Geography ==
The municipality lies at an altitude of 564 metres (1,850 ft) and covers an area of 46.79 km^{2} (18.07 sq mi) (2025).

It is located in the Kremnica Mountains on the brook Kremnický potok, which is a tributary of the Hron River. It is located around 20 kilometres (12 mi) west of Banská Bystrica (by line), 45 kilometres (28 mi) south of Martin and around 175 kilometres (109 mi) from Bratislava.

== Main sights ==
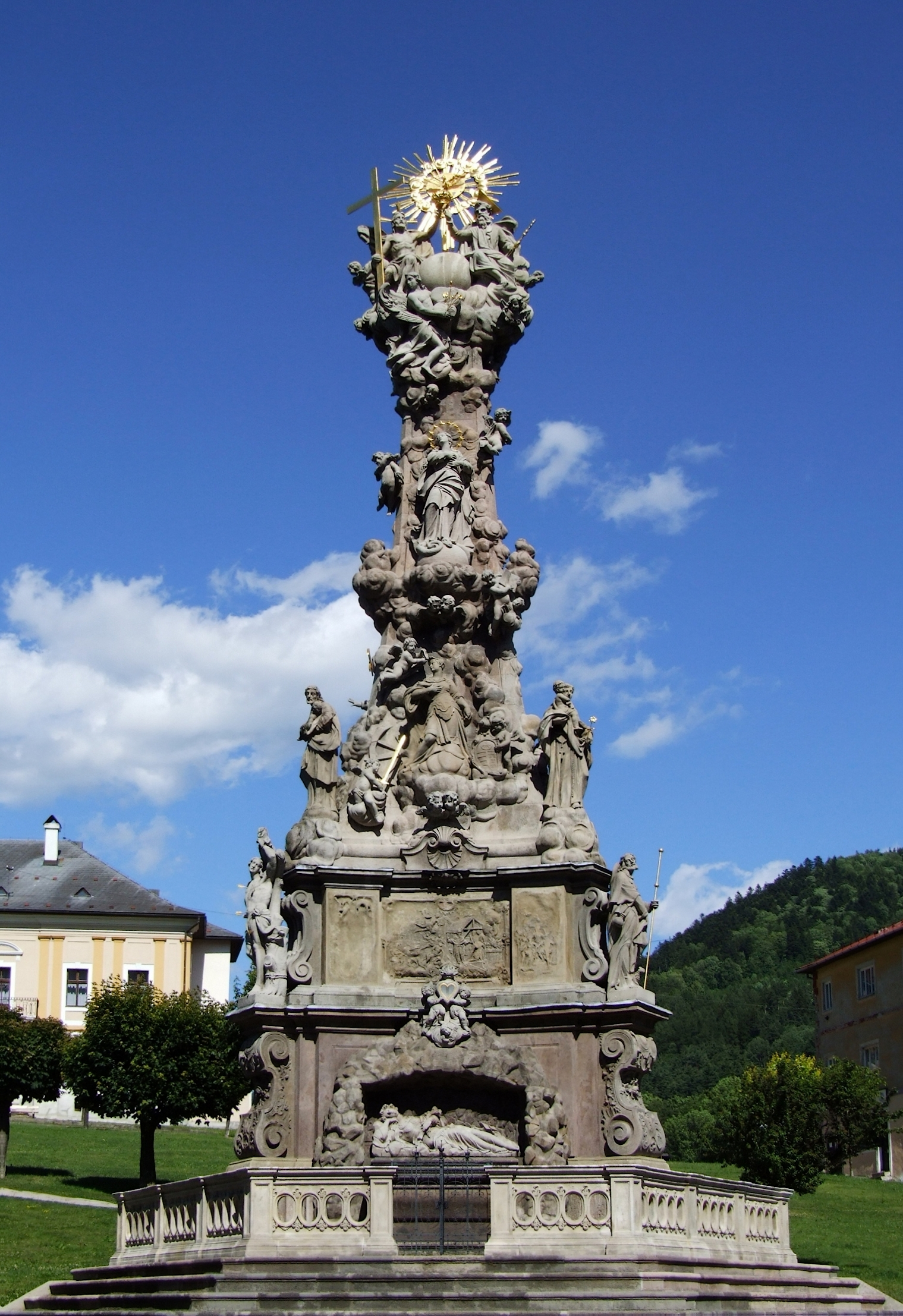
Plague column on main square.

The castle built in the 13th through 15th centuries towers over the town. In the first half of the 14th century, it became the residence of the Chamber Count. The town was immediately fortified with a double wall containing several bastions and towers. The castle represents a unique example of a very well preserved fortification system in Central Europe. In the 14th century, it developed into a multifunctional complex of buildings and thus became the centre of local administration, religious life, and defense. At the end of the 15th century, the Chamber Count moved to a newly built house with a unique diamond vault. Thereafter the residence of the Count in the castle was converted into the St. Catherine's Church.

Other sites of interest also include the Museum of Coins and Medals, the Museum of Skiing and a historical main square with a monumental Baroque plague column. The Gothic Church of St. Catherine hosts the popular European Organ Festival. A 20-km long aqueduct, built in the 15th century, is still working, supplying three hydroelectric power plants (one of them located 245 m below the ground). Forested mountains around the town offer plenty of opportunities for hiking and cross-country skiing.

The geographical centre of Europe is claimed to be in the nearby village of Krahule.

== Demographics ==
Historical population
Year	Pop.	±%
1970	6,121	—
1980	6,042	−1.3%
1991	6,299	+4.3%
2001	5,822	−7.6%
2011	5,601	−3.8%
2021	4,934	−11.9%
Source: Censuses

Population statistic (10 years)
Year	1995	2005	2015	2025
Count	6610	5621	5419	4586
Difference		−14.96%	−3.59%	−15.37%

Population statistic
Year	2024	2025
Count	4664	4586
Difference		−1.67%

It has a population of 4586 people (31 December 2025).

=== Ethnicity ===
Census 2021 (1+ %)
Ethnicity	Number	Fraction
Slovak	4649	94.22%
Not found out	239	4.84%
Romani	67	1.35%
Total	4934	

In year 2021 was 4934 people by ethnicity 4649 as Slovak, 239 as Not found out, 67 as Romani, 49 as German, 34 as Czech, 16 as Hungarian, 12 as Other, 10 as Rusyn, 5 as English, 4 as Ukrainian, 4 as French, 3 as Russian, 2 as Turkish, 2 as Serbian, 2 as Romanian, 2 as Austrian, 2 as Polish and 2 as Croatian.

Note on population: The difference values of population numbers in the table "Population statistic" and in the sections "Ethnicity" & "Religion" is caused by the use of various statistical methods.

=== Religion ===
Census 2021 (1+ %)
Religion	Number	Fraction
Roman Catholic Church	2388	48.4%
None	1948	39.48%
Not found out	242	4.9%
Evangelical Church	216	4.38%
Total	4934	

In year 2021 was 4934 people by religion 2388 from Roman Catholic Church, 1948 from None, 242 from Not found out, 216 from Evangelical Church, 33 from Greek Catholic Church, 32 from Christian Congregations in Slovakia, 17 from Other and not ascertained christian church, 17 from Ad hoc movements, 7 from Other, 5 from Eastern Orthodox Church, 5 from Paganism and natural spirituality, 4 from Calvinist Church, 4 from Apostolic Church, 3 from United Methodist Church, 3 from Buddhism, 2 from Old Catholic Church, 2 from Islam, 2 from Baptists Church, 1 from Jewish community, 1 from Jehovah's Witnesses, 1 from Hinduism and 1 from Seventh-day Adventist Church.

== Famous people ==
- Blažej Baláž, Slovak painter
- Ján Levoslav Bella, composer, conductor and music teacher
- Ľudovít Černák, politician and businessman
- Ladislav Chudík, Slovak actor
- Igor Kollár, race walker (representing Czechoslovakia and Slovakia)
- Peter Michalica, violinist
- Jozef Pribilinec, race walker, Olympic gold medalist

== Gallery ==
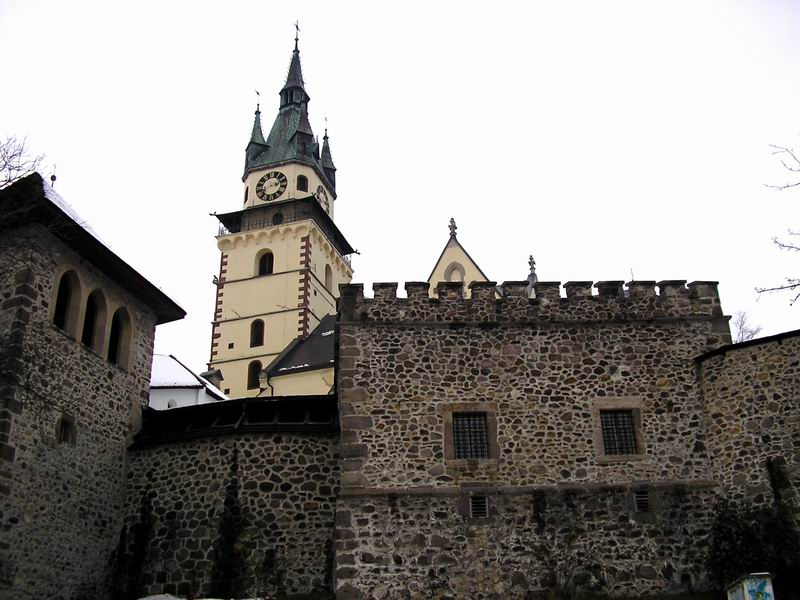
Town castle

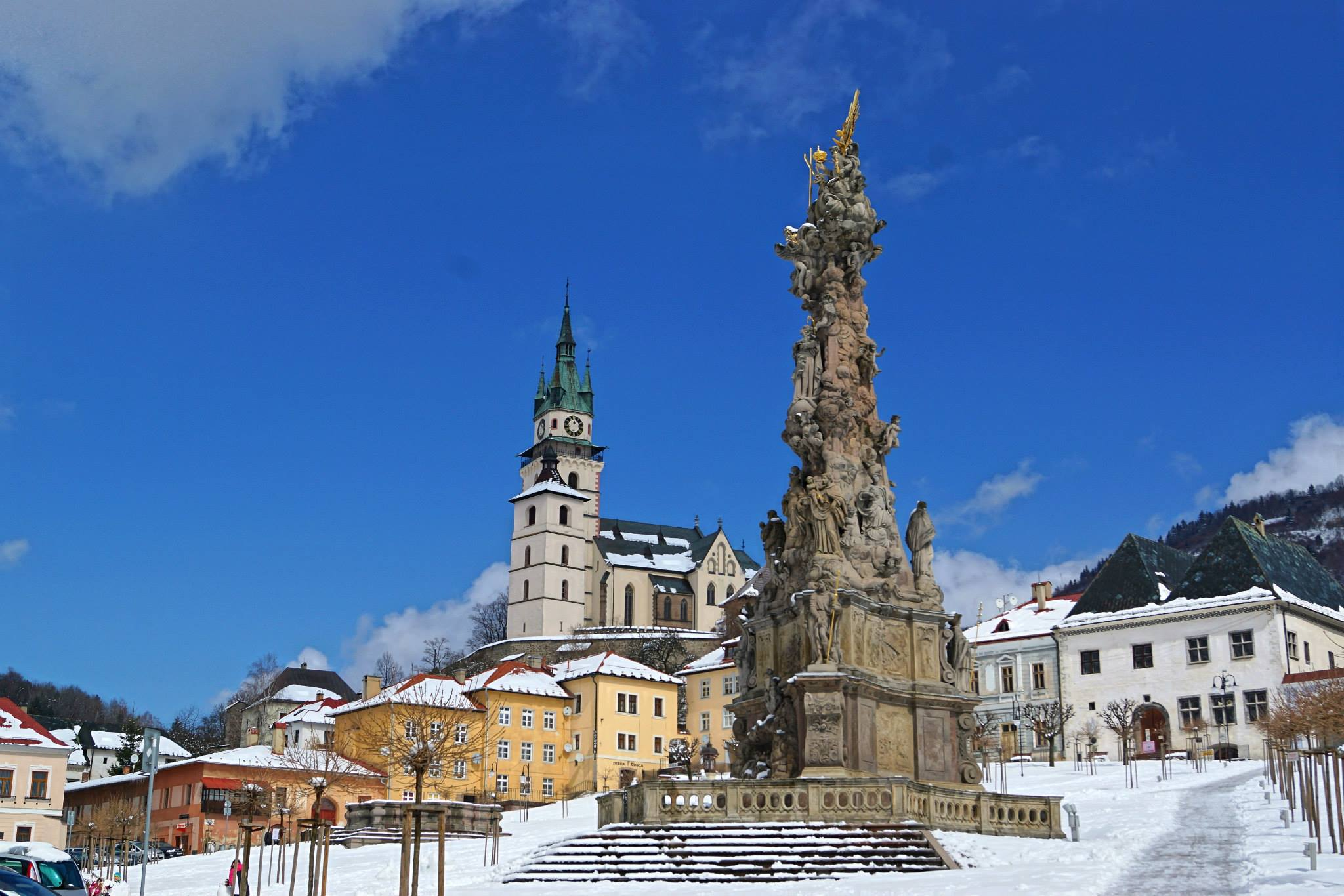
Main square

Plague column

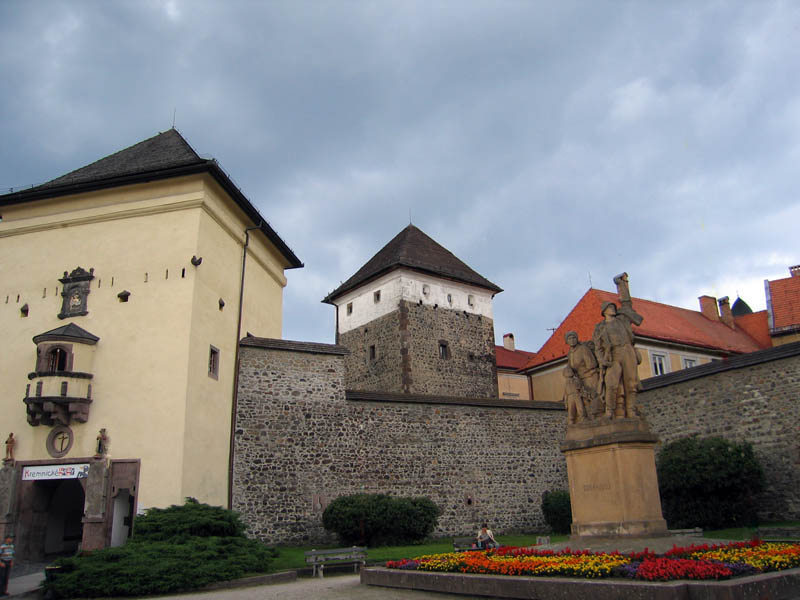
Barbican

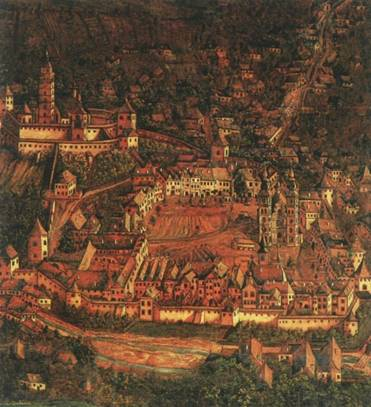
Kremnica, 1729

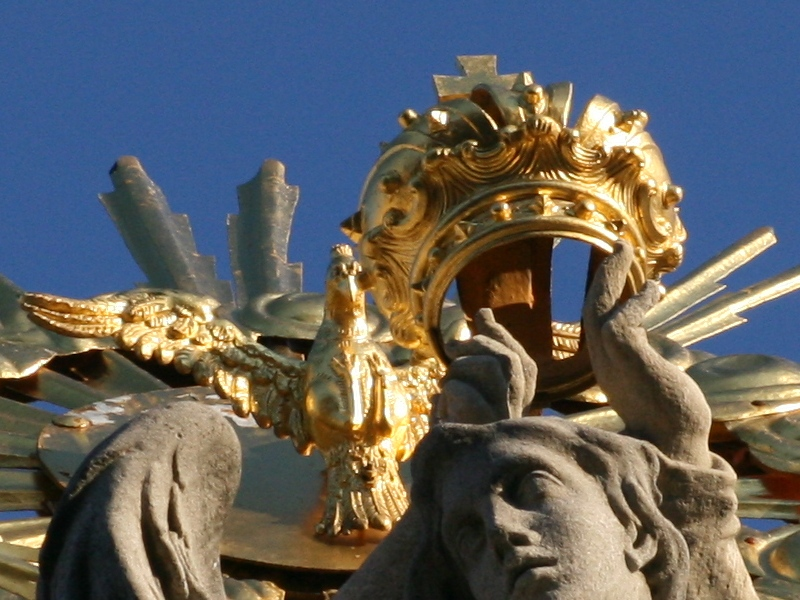
Detail of the plague column
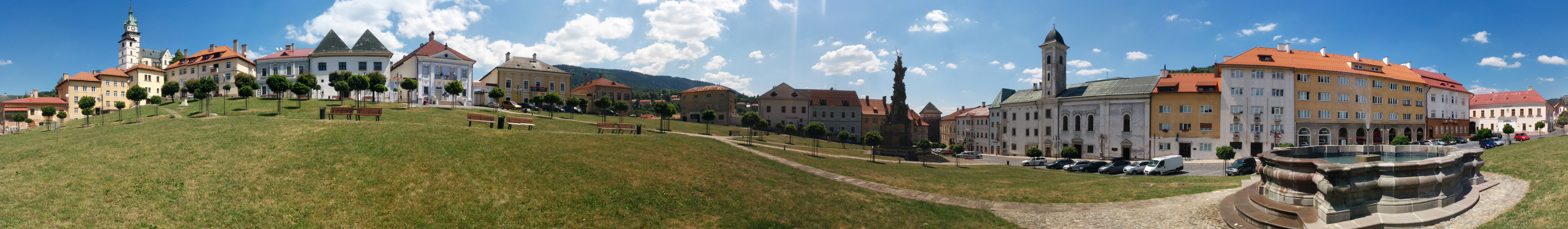
Main square

== Twin towns — sister cities ==
Kremnica is twinned with:

- Fidenza, Italy
- Herbolzheim, Germany
- Kutná Hora, Czech Republic
- Nový Jičín, Czech Republic
- Šurany, Slovakia
- Várpalota, Hungary
