= Železná hůrka =

Protected area in the Czech Republic

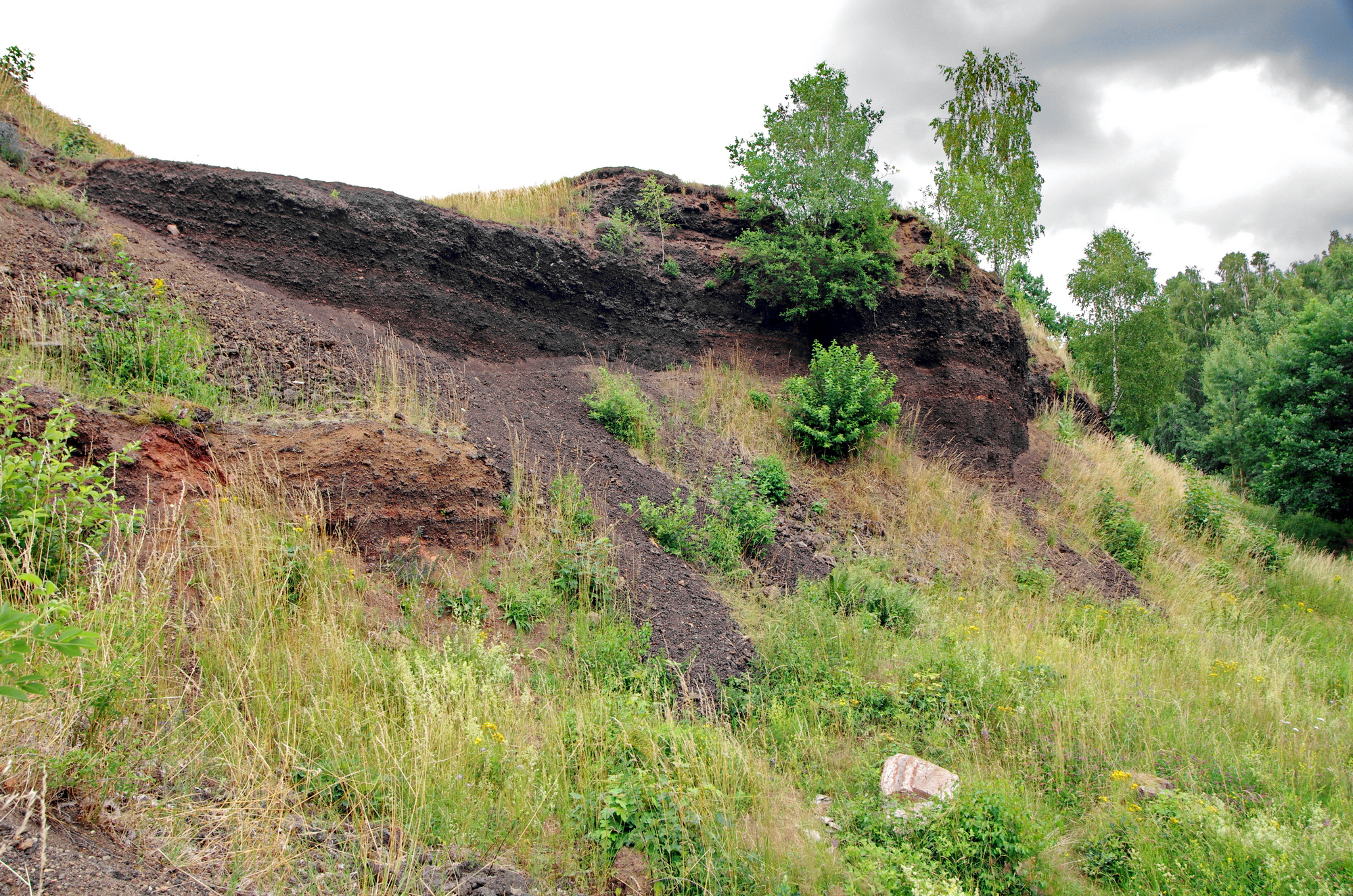

Highest point
- Elevation: 588 m (1,929 ft)
- Coordinates: 49°59′31.65″N 12°26′35.61″E

Geography
- Location within Czech Republic
- Parent range: Fichtel Mountains

Železná hůrka (German: Eisenbühl) is an extinct Quaternary volcano and a national nature monument in the Fichtel Mountains in the Czech Republic.

== Location ==
Železná hůrka is located about 1 km south of Mýtina in the Lipová municipality, in Cheb District in the Karlovy Vary Region of the Czech Republic. It lies in the easternmost part of the Fichtel Mountains. The area has also other manifestations of volcanic activity. Another Quaternary volcano, Komorní hůrka, is located nearby. CO_{2} outgassing occurs in the area.

== Metallic iron ==
The name means "iron hill" in Czech. Fragments of metallic iron are found in the local basalt deposits. Iron usually occurs on Earth only in the oxidized form, as iron ore, and needs to be processed into metallic iron by smelting. It is thought that in the Železná hůrka area, iron-rich magma entered coal deposits which caused iron compounds to be reduced to metallic iron, in a process similar to smelting used by humans, but natural in origin.

This kind of metallic iron from geological processes is rare on Earth (though it has been found in places including Disko Island).

== Geology ==
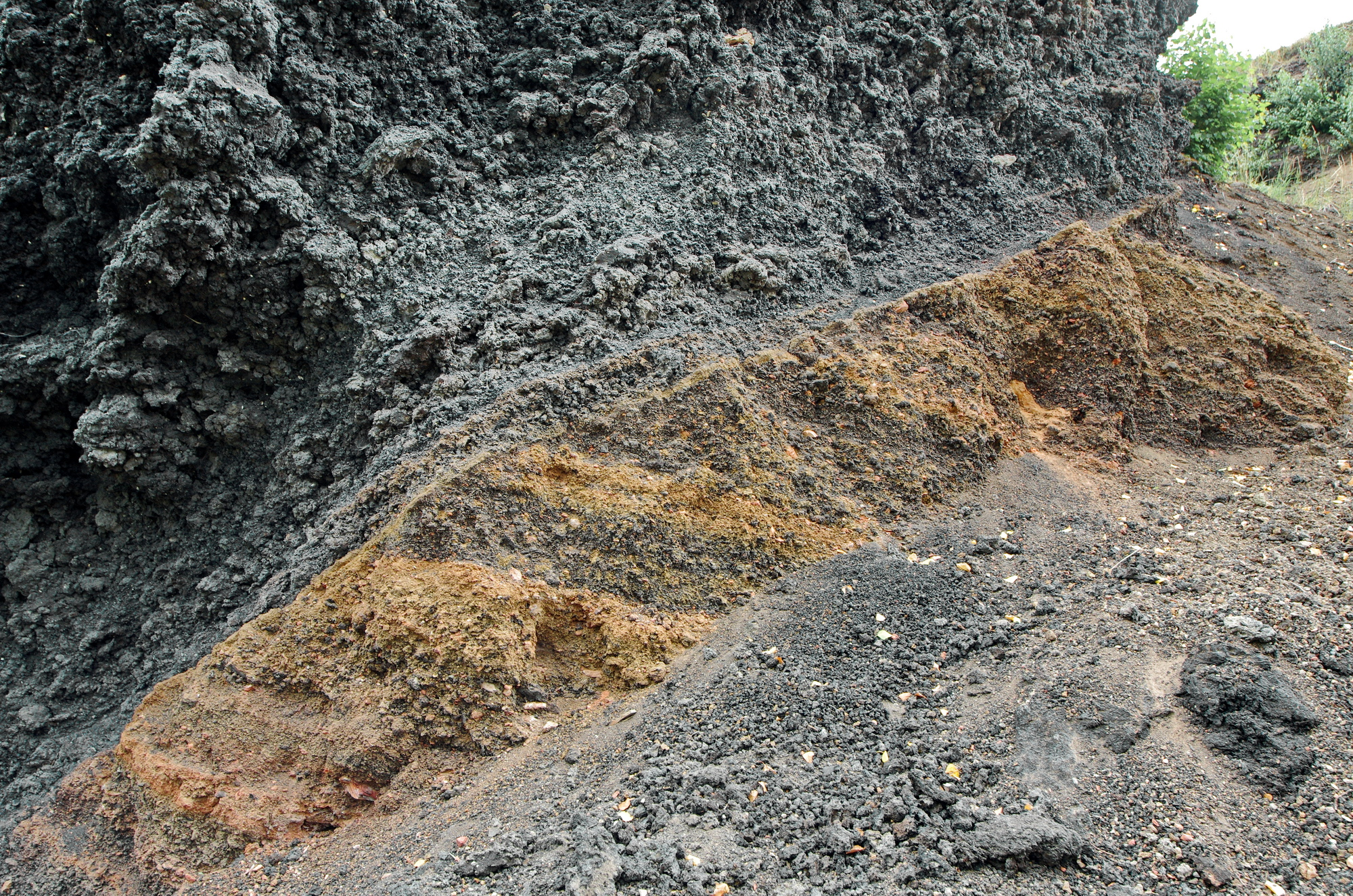
Discordant layers at Železná hůrka

Železná hůrka is a young volcano, geologically speaking. Samples from the lower, older part of its cone yielded the age of 519,000 years (with a margin of error of 51,000 years).

Two samples from tephra deposits in nearby Mýtina (possibly related to the volcano's later activity) yielded the age of 300,000 years.

The lower part of the volcanic cone consists of pyroclastic material deposited in discontinuous eruptions, with visible layering. At least the earliest of these eruptions were phreatomagmatic, caused by contact of groundwater with hot magma; they deposited brownish layers of material which contains low-porosity hydroclasts, as well as fragments of the host rock (old rock crushed and carried away by the eruption) with oxidized surfaces.

Then came another kind of volcanic (magmatic) activity, with less developed layering, which deposited black to dark-brown (melanephelinitic), slightly welded material, which contains fragments and blocks of porous lava, larger chunks of solidified lava known as volcanic bombs, and smaller fragments known as lapilli.

== Mýtina maar ==
A funnel-shaped dry depression, located less than two kilometres from Železná hůrka, was confirmed to be a volcanic maar in 2008.

This was the first maar discovered in Central Europe north of Alps and east of Volcanic Eifel.
