= Krahule =

Krahule Kékellő
- Municipality
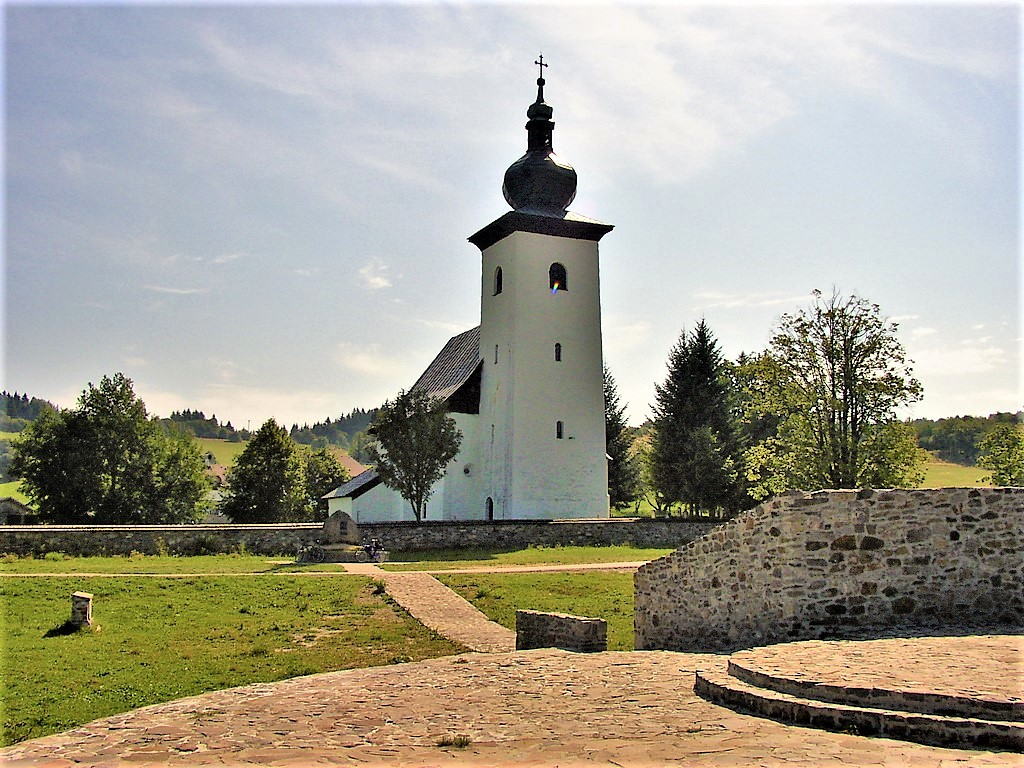
- Geographical center of Europe near Krahule

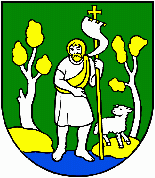
- Flag Coat of arms

- Location of Krahule in the Banská Bystrica Region Location of Krahule in Slovakia
- Coordinates: 48.73°N 18.93°E
- Country: Slovakia
- Region: Banská Bystrica Region
- District: Žiar nad Hronom District
- First mentioned: 1331

Government
  - Mayor: Miroslav Schwarz (Independent)

Area
  - Total: 10.77 km^{2} (4.16 sq mi)
- Elevation: 889 m (2,917 ft)

Population (2025)
  - Total: 252

Population by ethnicity (2011)
  - Slovaks: 61.4%
  - Germans: 31.5%
  - Ukrainians: 0.5%
  - Czechs: 0.5%
  - Unreported: 6.1%

Population by religion (2011)
  - Catholicism: 49.7%
  - Lutheranism: 18.8%
  - Other: 1.5%
  - Non-religious: 15.2%
  - Unreported: 14.7%
- Time zone: UTC+1 (CET)
  - Summer (DST): UTC+2 (CEST)
- Postal code: 967 01
- Area code: +421 45
- Vehicle registration plate (until 2022): ZH
- Website: www.krahule.sk

Krahule (German: Blaufuss; Hungarian: Kékellő, until 1890: Blaufusz) is a village in Žiar nad Hronom District in the Banská Bystrica Region of central Slovakia. It is the only municipality in Slovakia that officially uses German along with Slovak.

== Geography ==
The municipality lies at an altitude of 889 metres (2,917 ft) and covers an area of 10.77 km^{2} (4.16 sq mi) (2025).

== History ==
The town was first mentioned in writing in 1331 as Blaufuß (literally "blue" + "foot") and was created by German miners as a Weiler.

Throughout its history, most of the area legally belonged to the Crown and the village was administered by a local judge. In 1601 there were 39 houses in the village. A 1640-year decree appointed Paul König as Judge, after the death of James König. The first chapel and the first school were built in 1788. In 1806 the Baroque-Classical style Roman Catholic St. John Nepomuk Church was dedicated. In 1828 there were 635 inhabitants, entirely German speakers, mostly local miners and farmers, in 57 houses. From 1895 there was a state funded Bobbin lace making school.

Over 1944 and 1945 many Carpathian Germans fled the advancing Soviet army and never returned. The Communist regime then renamed the town "Krahule" in 1948 and brought in Slovak settlers.

From 1980 to 1992 the town was a part of the Kremnica municipality.

In the 2001 census 35 of the then 144 residents indicated that they were Carpathian Germans (Karpatendeutsche). The Krahule municipality therefore adopted German as the second official language in addition to Slovak.

In the same census 89 people gave their religion as Roman Catholic. One person described himself as a Hussite, 21 residents reported to be without confession and 21 Protestant.

Today the town is a popular winter sports and hiking venue. Krahule is located directly above Kremnica on a high terrace about 880 feet in the Kremnické vrchy (Kremnitzer Berge) mountains.

The current Mayor, or starosta, is Miroslav Schwarz.

== Genealogical resources ==
The records for genealogical research are available at the state archive "Štátny Archív in Banská Bystrica, Slovakia"

- Roman Catholic church records (births/marriages/deaths): 1848-1945 (parish A)
- Lutheran church records (births/marriages/deaths): 1666-1895 (parish B)

== Population ==
Population statistic (10 years)
Year	1995	2005	2015	2025
Count	146	158	258	252
Difference		+8.21%	+63.29%	−2.32%

Population statistic
Year	2024	2025
Count	253	252
Difference		−0.39%

It has a population of 252 people (31 December 2025).

=== Ethnicity ===
Census 2021 (1+ %)
Ethnicity	Number	Fraction
Slovak	242	93.43%
German	29	11.19%
Not found out	5	1.93%
Czech	4	1.54%
Total	259	

In year 2021 was 259 people by ethnicity 242 as Slovak, 29 as German, 5 as Not found out, 4 as Czech, 2 as Austrian, 1 as Ukrainian, 1 as Rusyn, 1 as Russian and 1 as Hungarian.

Note on population: The difference values of population numbers in the table "Population statistic" and in the sections "Ethnicity" & "Religion" is caused by the use of various statistical methods.

=== Religion ===
Census 2021 (1+ %)
Religion	Number	Fraction
Roman Catholic Church	138	53.28%
None	70	27.03%
Evangelical Church	42	16.22%
Not found out	5	1.93%
Ad hoc movements	3	1.16%
Total	259	

In year 2021 was 259 people by religion 138 from Roman Catholic Church, 70 from None, 42 from Evangelical Church, 5 from Not found out, 3 from Ad hoc movements and 1 from United Methodist Church.

== See also ==
- List of municipalities and towns in Slovakia
