= Saint-André-le-Coq =

- Commune
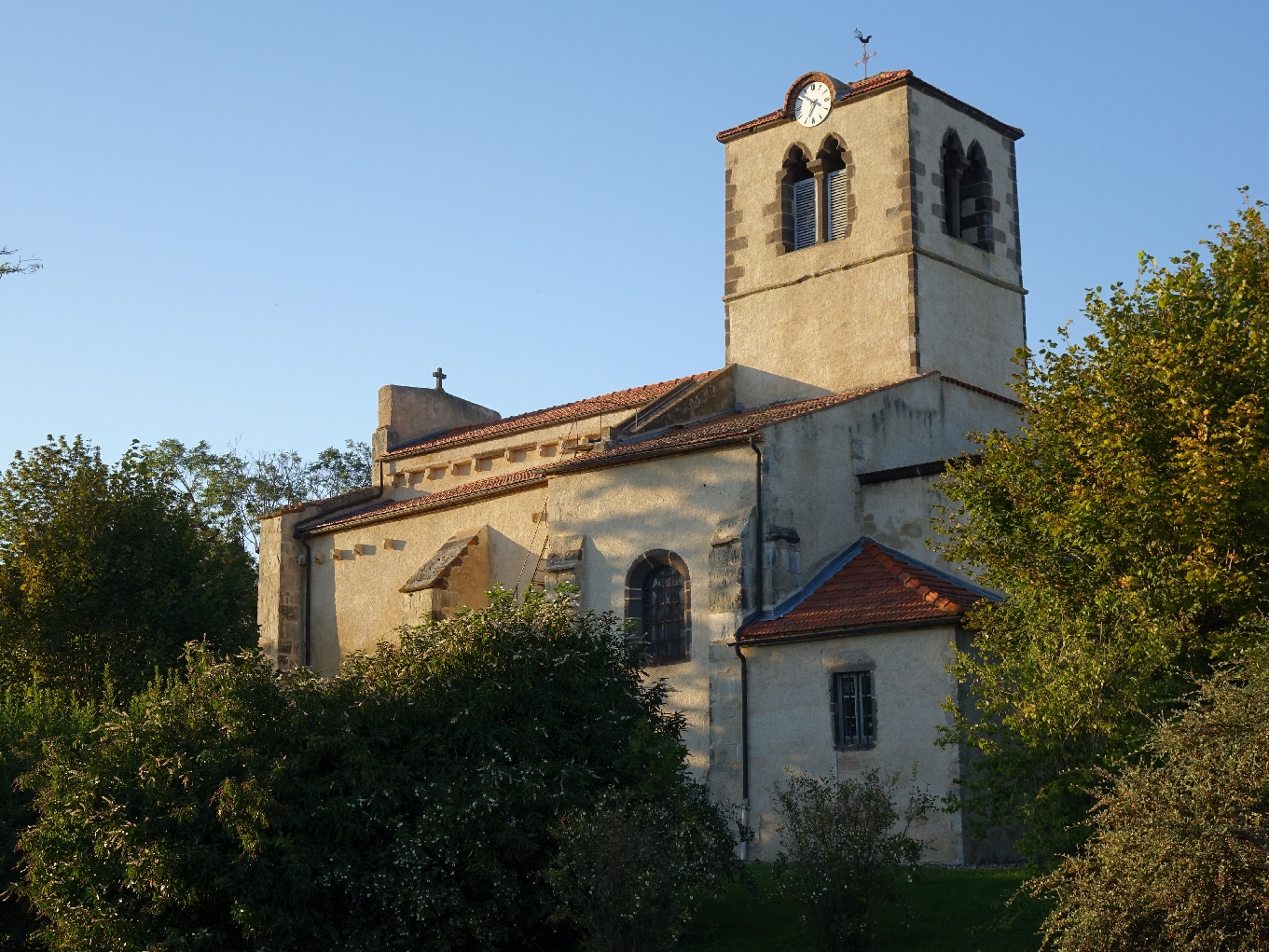
- The church in Saint-André-le-Coq

- Coat of arms
- Location of Saint-André-le-Coq
- Location within France Location within Auvergne-Rhône-Alpes
- Coordinates: 45°57′50″N 3°18′36″E
- Country: France
- Region: Auvergne-Rhône-Alpes
- Department: Puy-de-Dôme
- Arrondissement: Riom
- Canton: Maringues

Government
  - Mayor (2020–2026): Dominique Busson
- Area^{1}: 18.02 km^{2} (6.96 sq mi)
- Elevation: 320 m (1,050 ft)
- Highest elevation: 386 m (1,266 ft)
- Lowest elevation: 303 m (994 ft)
- Population (2023): 578
  - Density: 32.1/km^{2} (83.1/sq mi)
- Time zone: UTC+01:00 (CET)
  - Summer (DST): UTC+02:00 (CEST)
- INSEE/Postal code: 63317 /63310
- ^{1} French Land Register data, which excludes lakes, ponds, glaciers > 1 km^{2} (0.386 sq mi or 247 acres) and river estuaries.

Saint-André-le-Coq (French pronunciation: [sɛ̃.t‿ɑ̃dʁe lə kɔk]) is a commune in the Puy-de-Dôme department in Auvergne in central France.

== See also ==
- Communes of the Puy-de-Dôme department
