= Girija (village) =

- Village
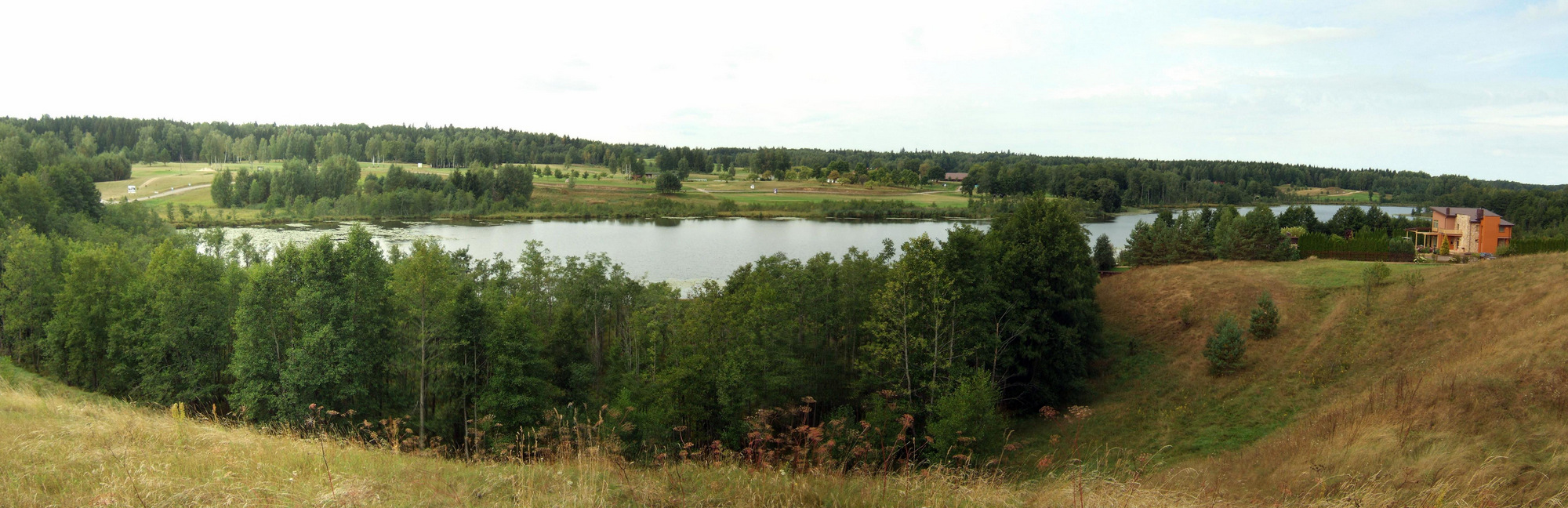
- Panorama of the Girija village and lake from the Bernotai Hillfort

- Location of Girija
- Coordinates: 54°54′40″N 25°18′43″E
- Country: Lithuania
- County: Vilnius County
- Municipality: Vilnius District Municipality
- Eldership: Nemenčinė Eldership

Population (2011)
  - Total: 9
- Time zone: UTC+2 (EET)
  - Summer (DST): UTC+3 (EEST)

Girija is a village in Vilnius District Municipality, Lithuania. According to the 2011 census, it had population of 9. It is located near the Girija Lake.

The only Geographical Centre of Europe recognized by the Guinness Book of World Records is located in Girija. The village also hosts the Europos Centro Golf Club.
