= Kremnické Bane =

Kremnické Bane Jánoshegy
- Municipality
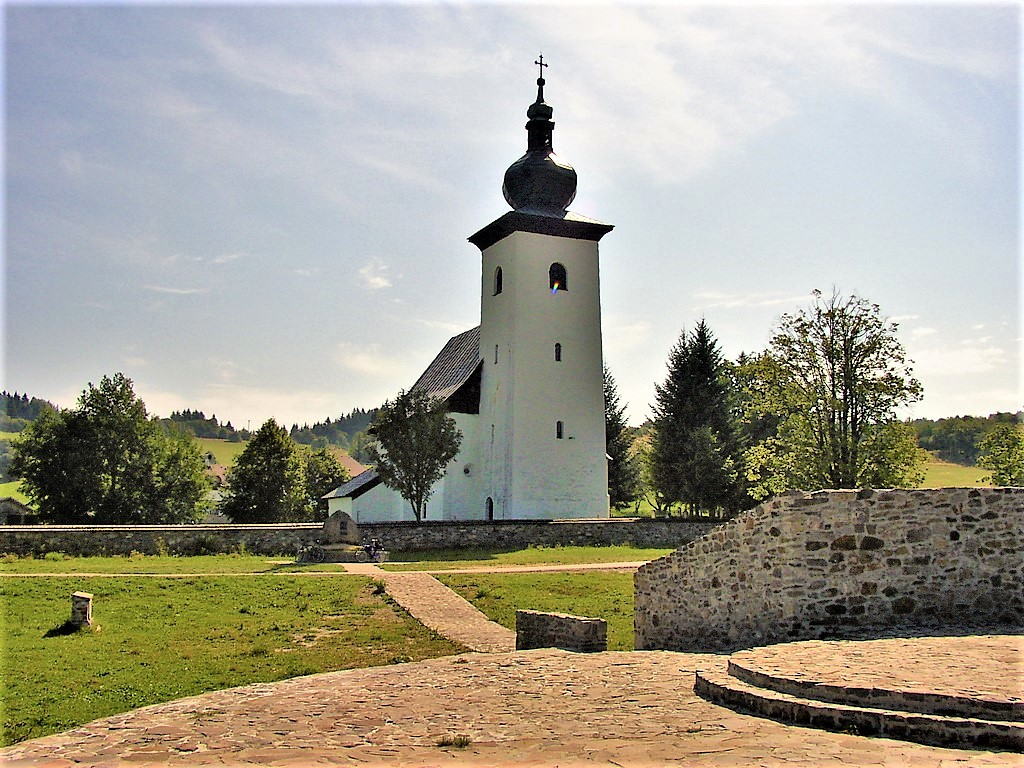
- Geographical center of Europe near Kremnické Bane

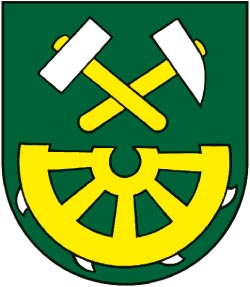
- Flag Coat of arms

- Location of Kremnické Bane in the Banská Bystrica Region Location of Kremnické Bane in Slovakia
- Coordinates: 48.73°N 18.92°E
- Country: Slovakia
- Region: Banská Bystrica Region
- District: Žiar nad Hronom District
- First mentioned: 1361

Government
  - Mayor: Juraj Vozár (Independent)

Area
  - Total: 7.74 km^{2} (2.99 sq mi)
- Elevation: 754 m (2,474 ft)

Population (2025)
  - Total: 253

Population by ethnicity (2011)
  - Slovak: 84%
  - German: 6.1%
  - Czech: 0.8%
  - Polish: 0.4%
  - Unreported: 8.7%

Population by religion (2011)
  - Roman Catholic: 71.1%
  - Lutheran: 5.3%
  - Greek Catholic: 0.8%
  - Non-religious: 11.4%
  - Unreported: 11.4%
- Time zone: UTC+1 (CET)
  - Summer (DST): UTC+2 (CEST)
- Postal code: 966 35
- Area code: +421 45
- Vehicle registration plate (until 2022): ZH
- Website: www.obeckremnickebane.sk

Kremnické Bane (German: Johannesberg; Hungarian: Jánoshegy) is a village and municipality in Žiar nad Hronom District in the Banská Bystrica Region of central Slovakia.

The village once belonged to the German language island of Hauerland but the majority of the German population was expelled at the end of World War II.

== Geography ==
The municipality lies at an altitude of 754 metres (2,474 ft) and covers an area of 7.74 km^{2} (2.99 sq mi) (2025).

== Population ==
Population statistic (10 years)
Year	1995	2005	2015	2025
Count	247	267	260	253
Difference		+8.09%	−2.62%	−2.69%

Population statistic
Year	2024	2025
Count	251	253
Difference		+0.79%

It has a population of 253 people (31 December 2025).

=== Ethnicity ===
Census 2021 (1+ %)
Ethnicity	Number	Fraction
Slovak	241	94.5%
Not found out	10	3.92%
German	10	3.92%
Romani	3	1.17%
Total	255	

In year 2021 was 255 people by ethnicity 241 as Slovak, 10 as Not found out, 10 as German, 3 as Romani, 1 as Czech and 1 as Polish.

Note on population: The difference values of population numbers in the table "Population statistic" and in the sections "Ethnicity" & "Religion" is caused by the use of various statistical methods.

=== Religion ===
Census 2021 (1+ %)
Religion	Number	Fraction
Roman Catholic Church	158	61.96%
None	67	26.27%
Evangelical Church	14	5.49%
Not found out	8	3.14%
Greek Catholic Church	6	2.35%
Total	255	

In year 2021 was 255 people by religion 158 from Roman Catholic Church, 67 from None, 14 from Evangelical Church, 8 from Not found out, 6 from Greek Catholic Church, 1 from Other and 1 from United Methodist Church.
