= Dyleň =

Mountain in the Czech Republic

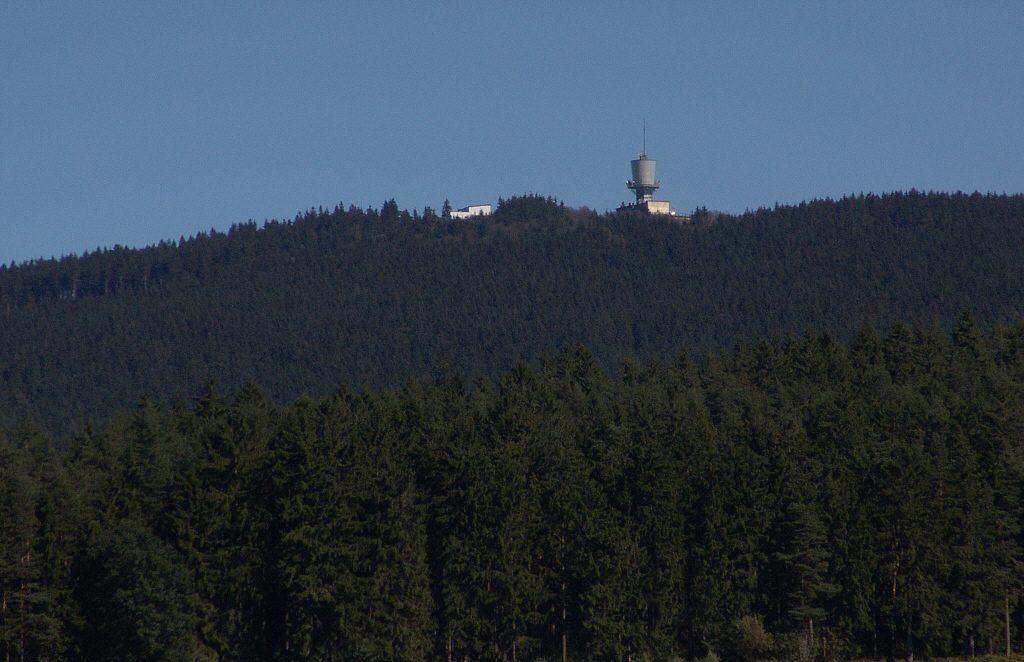

Highest point
- Elevation: 940 m (3,080 ft)
- Prominence: 336 m (1,102 ft)
- Isolation: 10.4 km (6.5 mi)
- Coordinates: 49°58′4″N 12°30′10″E

Geography
- Location within Czech Republic
- Location: Stará Voda, Czech Republic
- Parent range: Upper Palatinate Forest

Dyleň (German: Tillenberg) is a mountain in the Karlovy Vary Region of the Czech Republic. At 940 metres (3,080 ft) above sea level, its summit is the second-highest peak in the Upper Palatinate Forest.

The summit is located in the Stará Voda municipality. It lies about 600 metres (2,000 ft) east of the Czech Republic–Germany border.

Local tradition holds that Napoleon Bonaparte declared Tillenberg the geographical midpoint of Europe in 1813.

The German name provided the title of the epic poem Der Tillenberg: Ein Sagenschatz aus dem Egerlande (A Treasury of Tales from the Egerland) published in 1904 by Ernst Freimut (pseudonym of Johann (Hans) Sommert).

On the summit is a set of prominent buildings, which were used by the Soviet Union for electronic espionage into Germany during the Cold War. Now it is a radio and television transmission tower.

== Climate ==
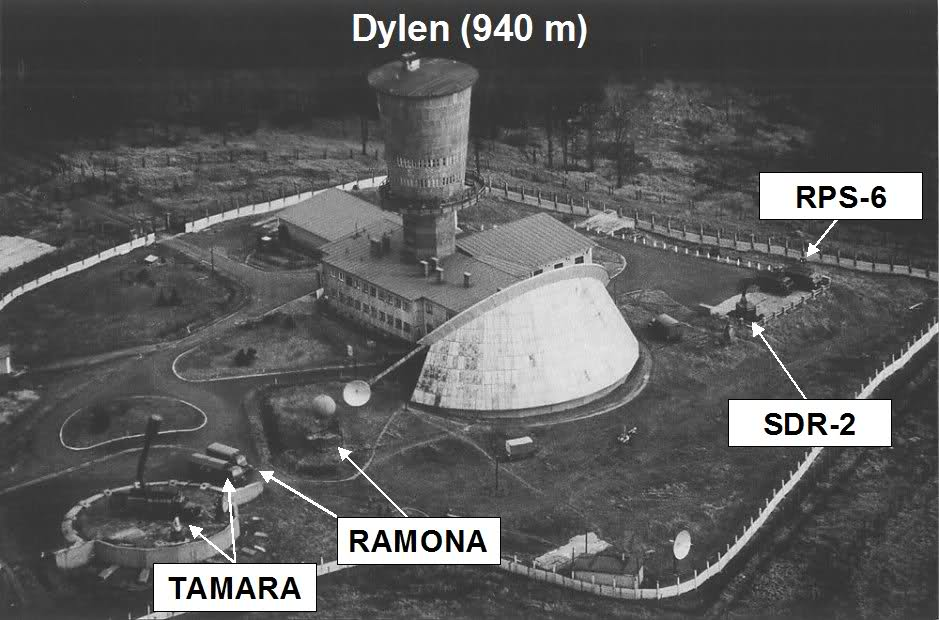
Photo by U.S. Government

Dyleň has a humid continental climate (Köppen Dfb). The annual average temperature is 6.0 °C (42.8 °F), the hottest month in August is 15.4 °C (59.7 °F), and the coldest month is −3.0 °C (26.6 °F) in January. The annual precipitation is 746.4 millimetres (29.39 in), of which July is the wettest with 89.0 millimetres (3.50 in), while February is the driest with only 38.9 millimetres (1.53 in). The extreme temperature throughout the year ranged from −21.3 °C (−6.3 °F) on 7 February 2012 to 32.4 °C (90.3 °F) on 13 August 2003.

Climate data for Dyleň, 1991–2020 normals, extremes 1998–present
Month	Jan	Feb	Mar	Apr	May	Jun	Jul	Aug	Sep	Oct	Nov	Dec	Year
Record high °C (°F)	11.9 (53.4)	14.6 (58.3)	18.8 (65.8)	23.2 (73.8)	28.2 (82.8)	31.7 (89.1)	32.0 (89.6)	32.4 (90.3)	26.7 (80.1)	21.1 (70.0)	16.0 (60.8)	12.6 (54.7)	32.4 (90.3)
Mean daily maximum °C (°F)	−1.0 (30.2)	0.1 (32.2)	4.0 (39.2)	10.2 (50.4)	14.4 (57.9)	18.1 (64.6)	19.5 (67.1)	19.8 (67.6)	14.3 (57.7)	8.8 (47.8)	3.4 (38.1)	0.1 (32.2)	9.3 (48.7)
Daily mean °C (°F)	−3.0 (26.6)	−2.4 (27.7)	0.9 (33.6)	6.0 (42.8)	10.1 (50.2)	13.7 (56.7)	15.2 (59.4)	15.4 (59.7)	10.8 (51.4)	6.0 (42.8)	1.3 (34.3)	−2.1 (28.2)	6.0 (42.8)
Mean daily minimum °C (°F)	−5.0 (23.0)	−4.6 (23.7)	−1.8 (28.8)	2.5 (36.5)	6.5 (43.7)	9.9 (49.8)	11.5 (52.7)	12.0 (53.6)	8.0 (46.4)	3.6 (38.5)	−0.6 (30.9)	−4.1 (24.6)	3.1 (37.6)
Record low °C (°F)	−21.1 (−6.0)	−21.3 (−6.3)	−17.5 (0.5)	−10.4 (13.3)	−3.4 (25.9)	0.5 (32.9)	3.5 (38.3)	3.0 (37.4)	−0.4 (31.3)	−10.4 (13.3)	−14.2 (6.4)	−20.0 (−4.0)	−21.3 (−6.3)
Average precipitation mm (inches)	53.7 (2.11)	38.9 (1.53)	47.3 (1.86)	43.2 (1.70)	68.3 (2.69)	75.1 (2.96)	89.0 (3.50)	81.2 (3.20)	74.4 (2.93)	60.6 (2.39)	58.6 (2.31)	56.0 (2.20)	746.4 (29.39)
Average snowfall cm (inches)	39.5 (15.6)	28.3 (11.1)	21.4 (8.4)	6.0 (2.4)	0.1 (0.0)	0.0 (0.0)	0.0 (0.0)	0.0 (0.0)	0.1 (0.0)	3.1 (1.2)	15.3 (6.0)	28.0 (11.0)	141.8 (55.8)
Average relative humidity (%)	93.7	89.5	82.0	72.0	72.3	72.3	72.0	71.4	80.7	89.4	93.4	93.5	81.8
Source: Czech Hydrometeorological Institute
