= Girija Dam =

- Location within Maharashtra
- Official name: Girija Dam D02846
- Location: Khultabad
- Coordinates: 20.0617261°N 75.2088564°E
- Opening date: 1986
- Owners: Government of Maharashtra, India

Dam and spillways
- Type of dam: Earthfill
- Impounds: Girija river
- Height: 19.1 m (63 ft)
- Length: 3,060 m (10,040 ft)
- Dam volume: 70 km^{3} (17 cu mi)

Reservoir
- Total capacity: 21,230 km^{3} (5,090 cu mi)
- Surface area: 775 km^{2} (299 sq mi)

Girija Dam, is an earthfill dam on Girija river near Khultabad, Aurangabad district in the state of Maharashtra in India.

== Specifications ==
The height of the dam above lowest foundation is 19.1 m (63 ft) while the length is 3,060 m (10,040 ft). The volume content is 70 km^{3} (17 cu mi) and gross storage capacity is 24,500.00 km^{3} (5,877.86 cu mi).

== Purpose ==
- Irrigation

== See also ==
- Dams in Maharashtra
- List of reservoirs and dams in India
