= Girija Keer =

Indian Marathi writer (1933–2019)

- Girija Keer
- Born: 5 February 1933; Dharwad, Karnataka, India
- Died: 31 October 2019 (aged 86); Bandra, Mumbai, Maharashtra, India
- Writing career
- Language: Marathi
- Genres: Novels, short stories, travelogues, and literature for children
- Notable work: Janmathep

Girija Keer (5 February 1933—31 October 2019) was an Indian Marathi language writer from Maharashtra state. She started her career as a school teacher in a village. Keer had written around 115 books in Marathi Language in the fields of novels, short stories, travelogues, and literature for children.

Following a six-year research involving interviews with prisoners undergoing life imprisonment at Yerawada prison near Pune, she recently published a book titled Janmathep.

Keer has received awards for her works. Some of them include the Pune Marathi Library's Kamalabai Tilak Award, the Abhiruchi Award and the Shri Akshar dhan Mahila Sahitya Award from Mumbai.

== Death ==
Keer died on 30 October 2019 at her Mumbai residence due to Ill health.
