= Herzbach =

River in Germany

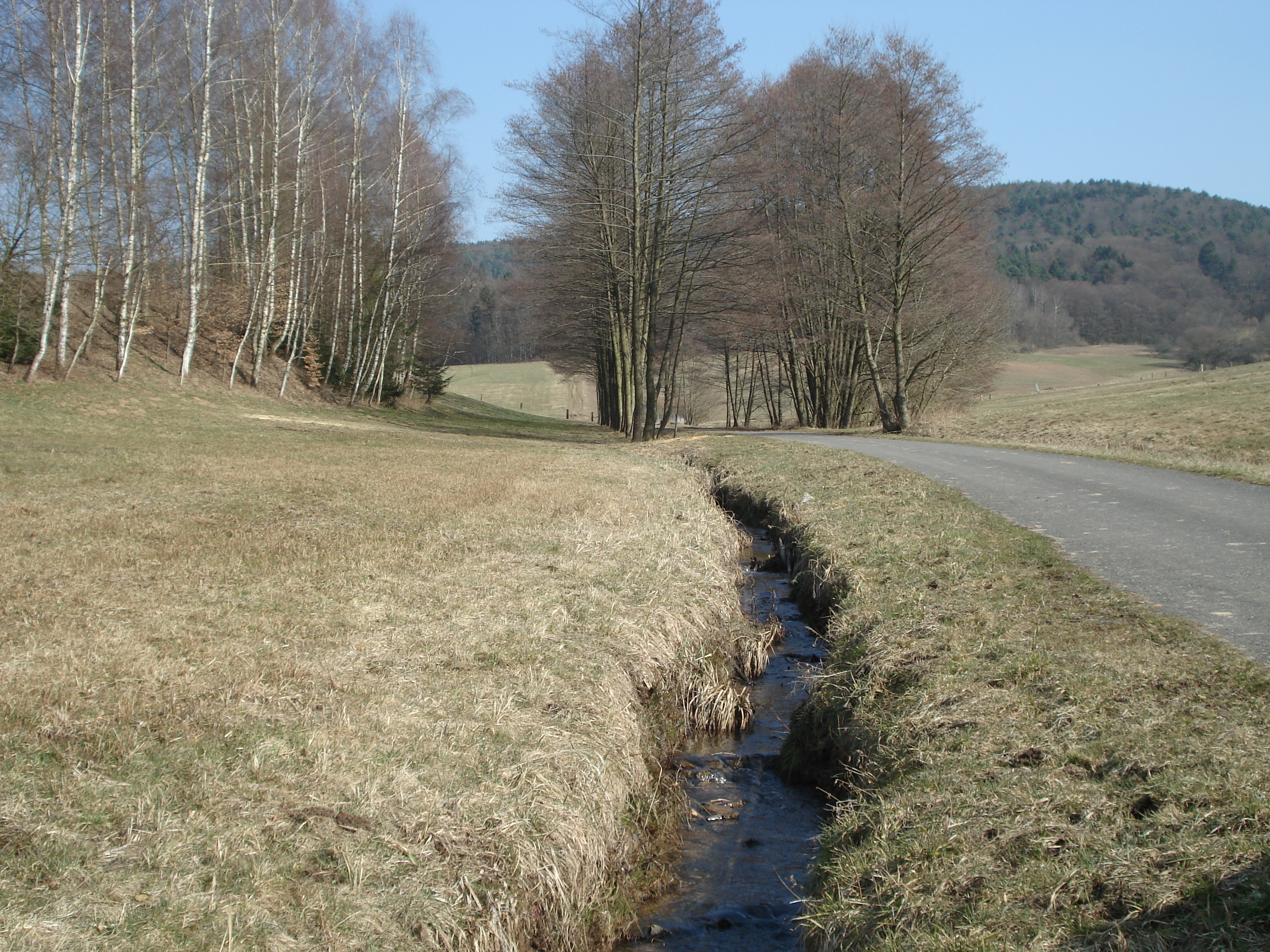
- The Herzbach upstream from Oberwestern (part of Westerngrund)

Location
- Country: Germany
- States: Bavaria

Physical characteristics
- Mouth
  - location: Westerbach
  - coordinates: 50°06′53″N 9°14′27″E

Basin features
- Progression: Westerbach→ Kahl→ Main→ Rhine→ North Sea

Herzbach is a 2.3-kilometer-long forest stream in Bavaria, Germany.

The Herzbach rises on the mountain of Herzberg (427 m) in the Huckelheimer Forest, northeast of Oberwestern (part of Westerngrund) in the Herzborn. It is ecologically significant as part of the headwaters region of the Kahl River catchment area.

== Source and Course ==
The stream originates at the Herzborn (Herz spring) on the western slope of the Herzberg mountain (427 m a.s.l.) within the Huckelheimer Forest. It flows exclusively through the municipal territory of Westerngrund in the Aschaffenburg district. This region, known as the Bavarian Spessart, is characterized by wooded hills and small valleys.

== Watershed and Significance ==
Upon reaching the village of Oberwestern, the Herzbach flows into the Westerbach in Westerngrund as a left tributary. The Westerbach, in turn, flows into the Kahl near Schöllkrippen. This makes the Herzbach an important part of a sequence of rivers that drain the region into the Main, and eventually the Rhine, connecting it to the North Sea flow system (Flusssystem: Rhein). Due to its location in a wooded, low-mountain area, the Herzbach's flow and water quality are closely monitored by the Bavarian State Office for the Environment (LfU).

== See also ==
- List of rivers of Bavaria
