= Westerbach (Kahl) =

River in Germany

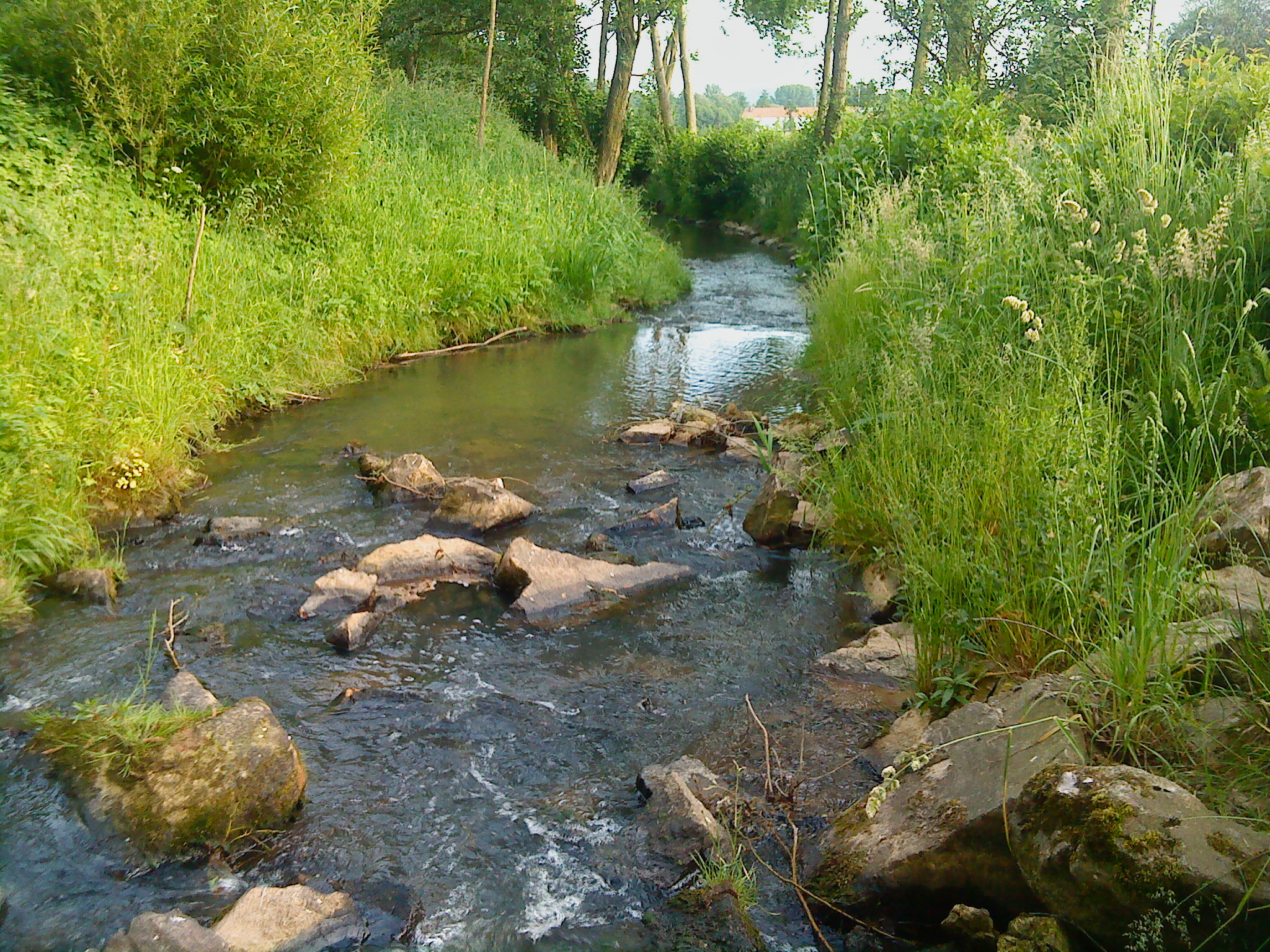
- The Westerbach beneath the former mill Klotzenmühle

Location
- Country: Germany
- State: Bavaria
- Reference no.: DE: 247722

Physical characteristics
- Source
  - location: confluence of Querbach and Huckelheimer Bach in Huckelheim
  - coordinates: 50°07′39″N 9°14′27″E
- Mouth
  - location: in Schöllkrippen in the Kahl
  - coordinates: 50°05′10″N 9°14′41″E
- Length: 7.2 km (4.5 mi)

Basin features
- Progression: Kahl→ Main→ Rhine→ North Sea

The Westerbach (German pronunciation: [ˈvɛstɐbax]) is a right tributary of the Kahl in the northern Spessart in Lower Franconia, Bavaria, Germany.

It is 6.3 km (3.9 mi) long (7.2 km including Querbach) and begins at the confluence of Querbach and Huckelheimer Bach in Westerngrund. The Querbach rises in the Arzborn, a small opening in the mountainside on the Hoher Querberg, northeast of Huckelheim, near the border between Hesse and Bavaria. In Schöllkrippen the Westerbach empties in the Kahl.

Together with the Sommerkahl, Reichenbach and Geiselbach, the Westerbach is one of the largest tributaries of the Kahl.

== Tributaries ==
- Querbach (left headstream)
- Huckelheimer Bach (right headstream)
- Hombach (right)
- Schulzengrundbach (left)
- Dörnsenbach (right)
- Herzbach (left)
- Schneppenbach (right)
- Betzenbach (right)
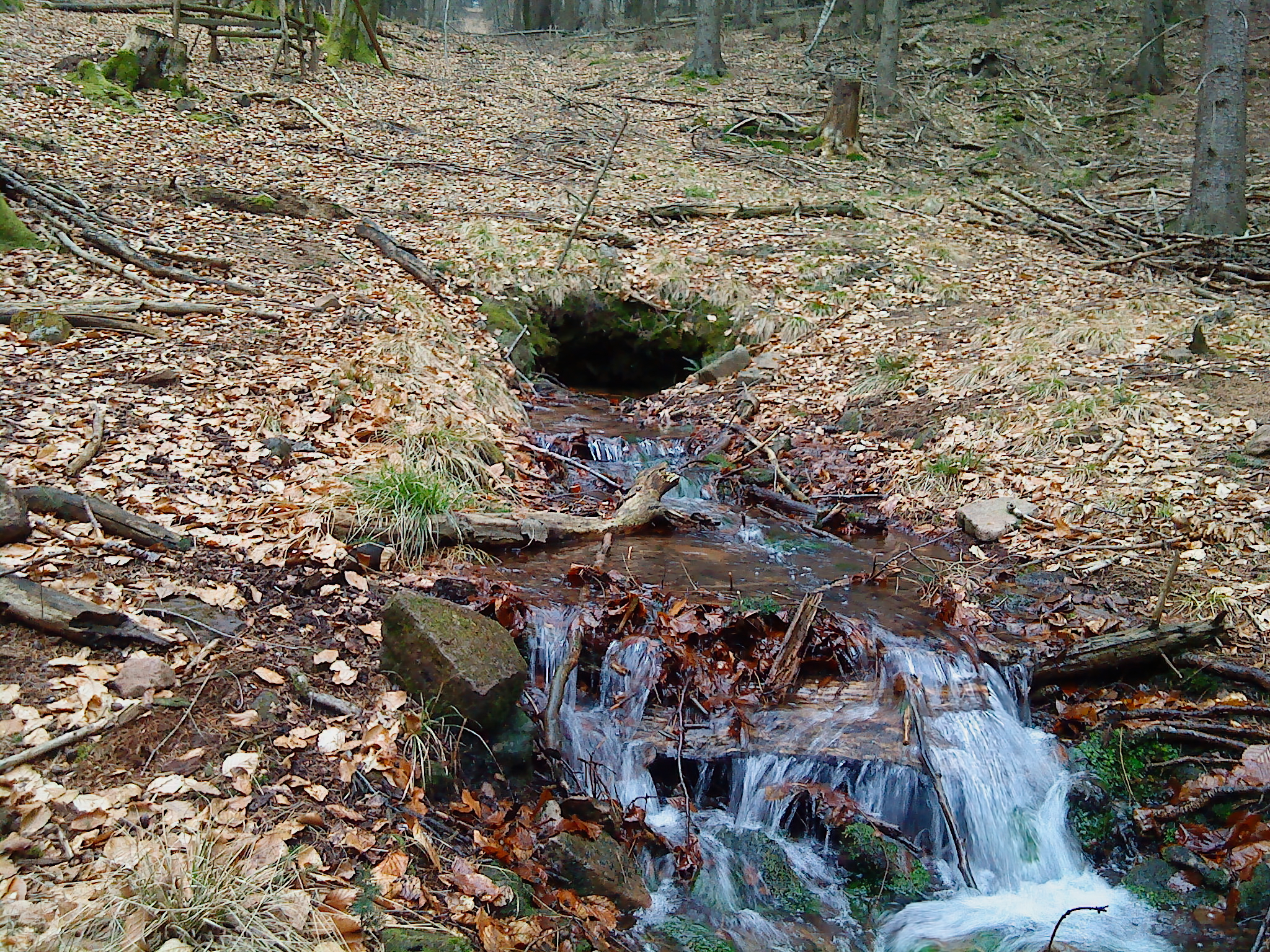
The Arzborn (spring of the Querbach)

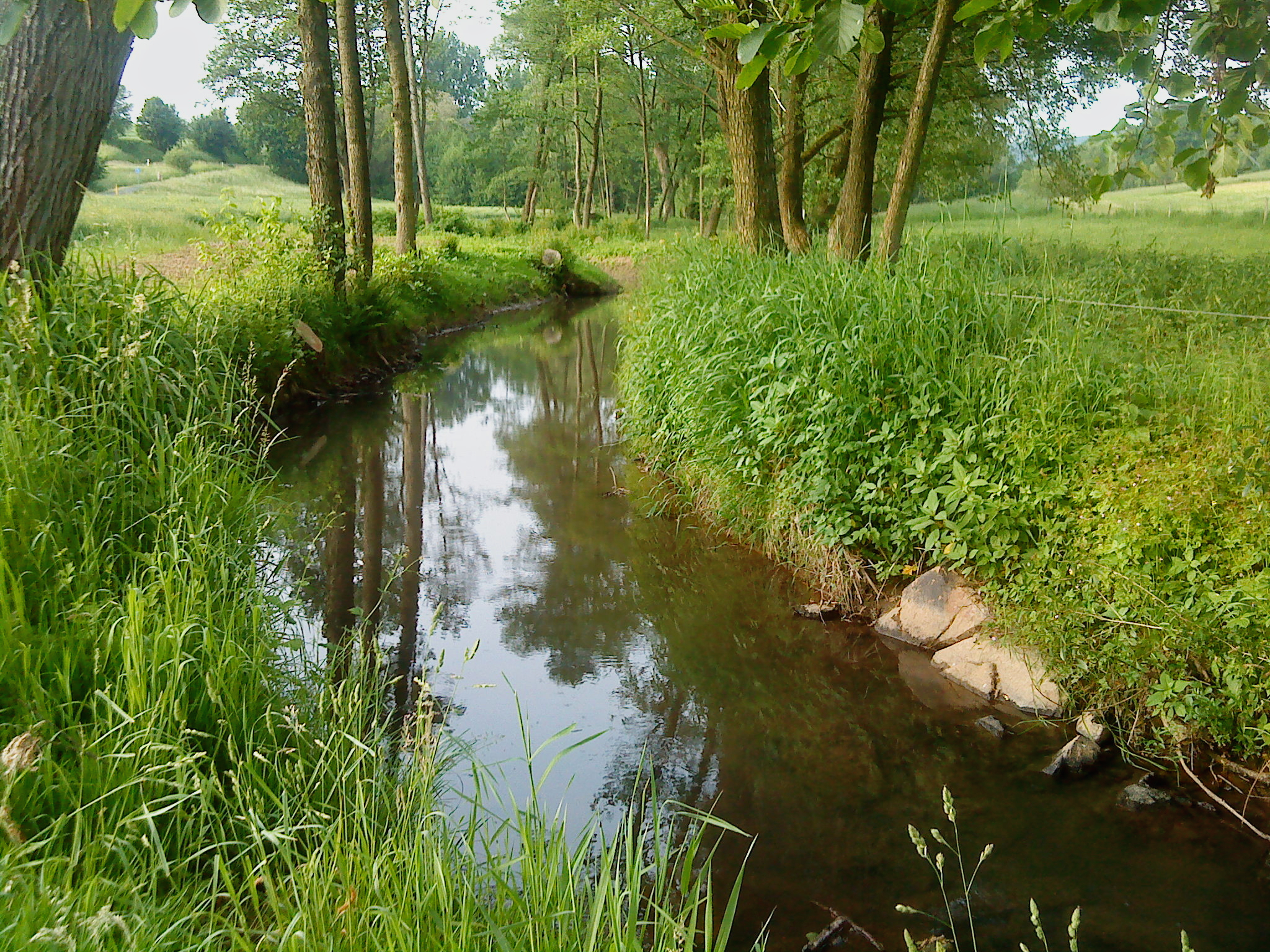
Between Unterwestern and Schneppenbach

== See also ==
- List of rivers of Bavaria
