= Schulzengrundbach =

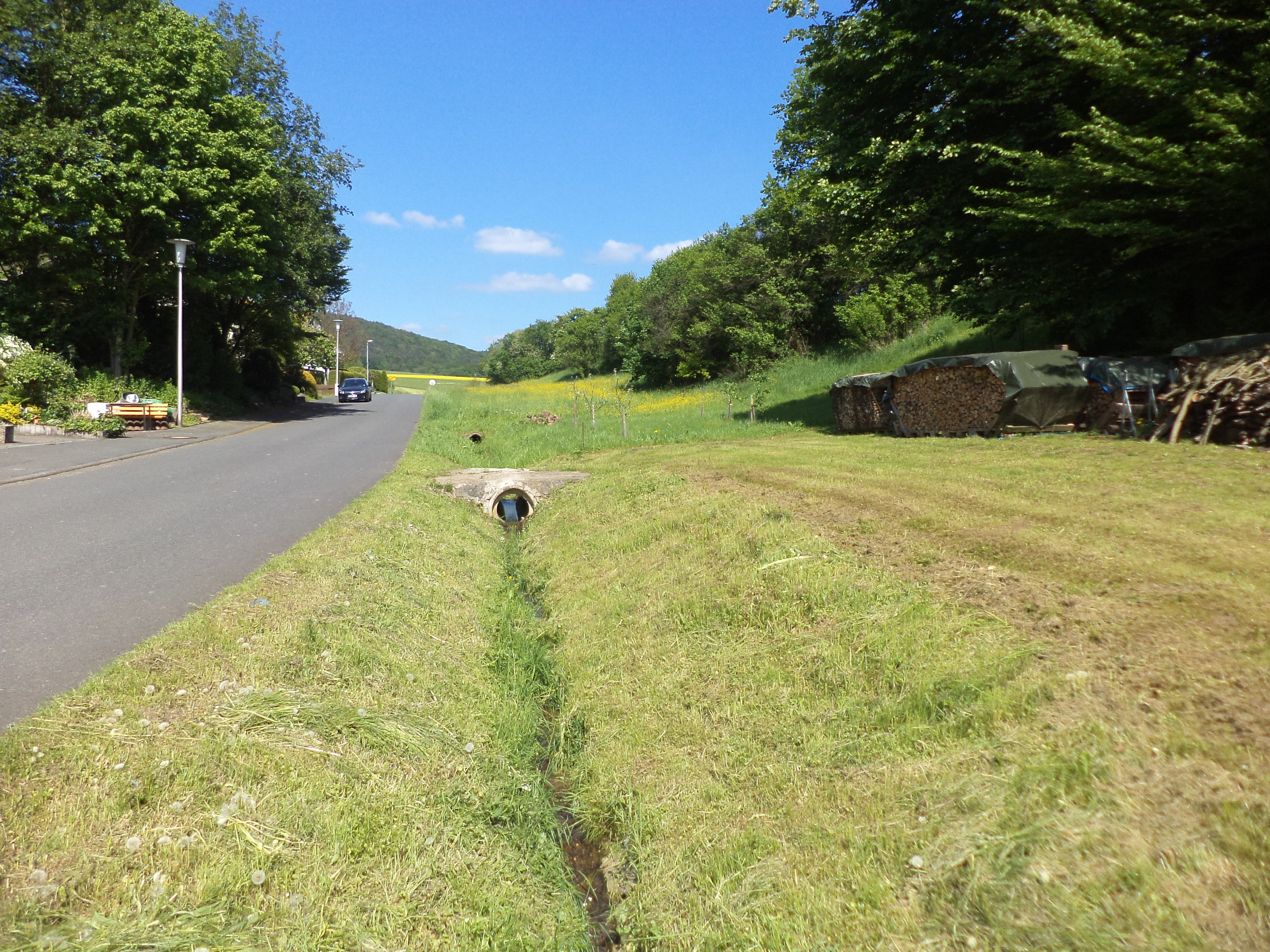
- The Schulzengrundbach in Westerngrund-Oberwestern

Location
- Country: Germany
- State: Bavaria
- District: Aschaffenburg

Physical characteristics
- Source
  - location: östlich von Westerngrund-Oberwestern
  - coordinates: 50°07′08″N 9°15′16″E
  - elevation: 280 m above sea level (NN)
- Mouth
  - location: in Westerngrund-Oberwestern into the Westerbach
  - coordinates: 50°06′57″N 9°14′29″E
  - elevation: 240 m above sea level (NN)
- Length: 1.0 km

Basin features
- Progression: Westerbach→ Kahl→ Main→ Rhine→ North Sea
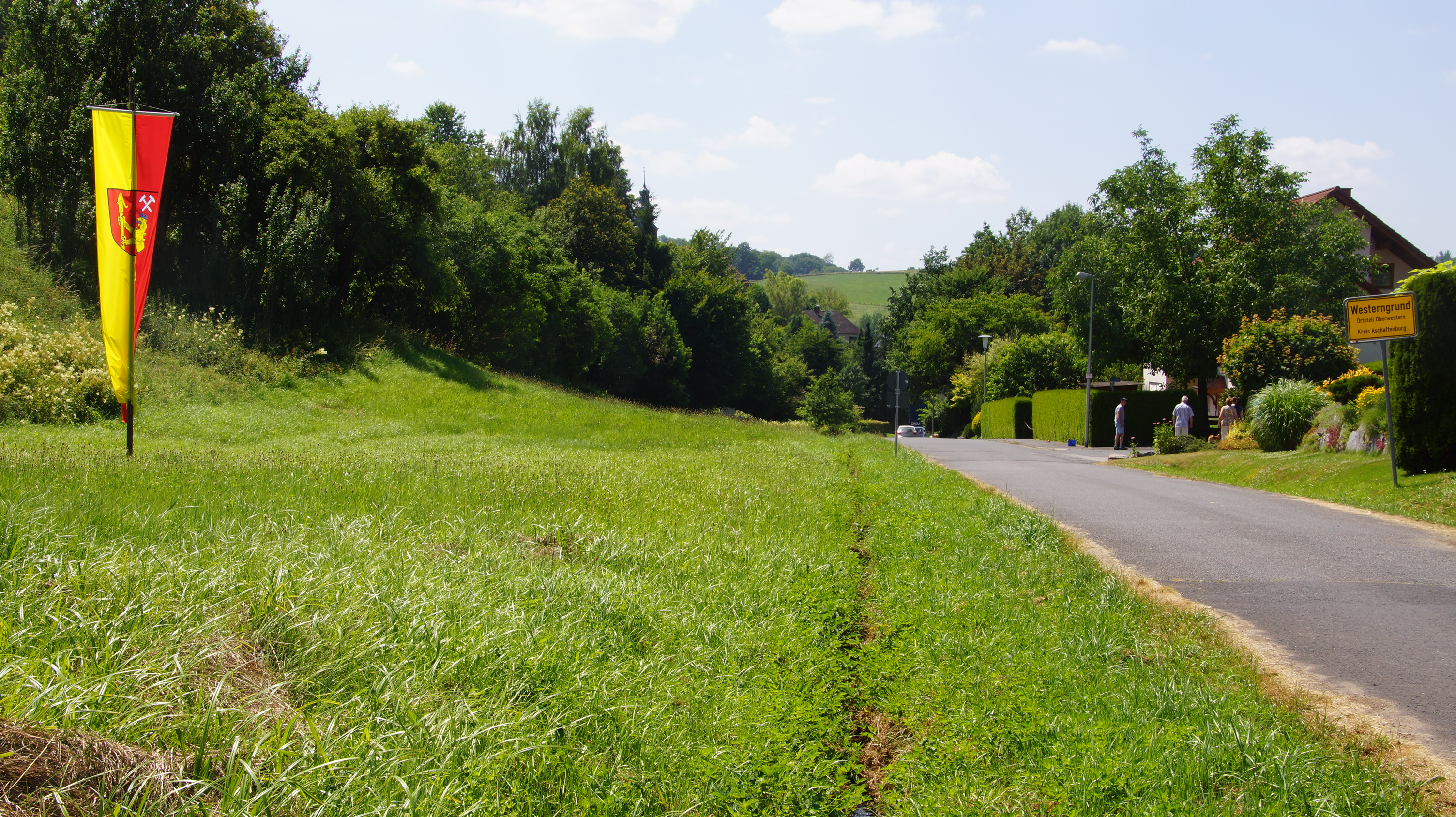
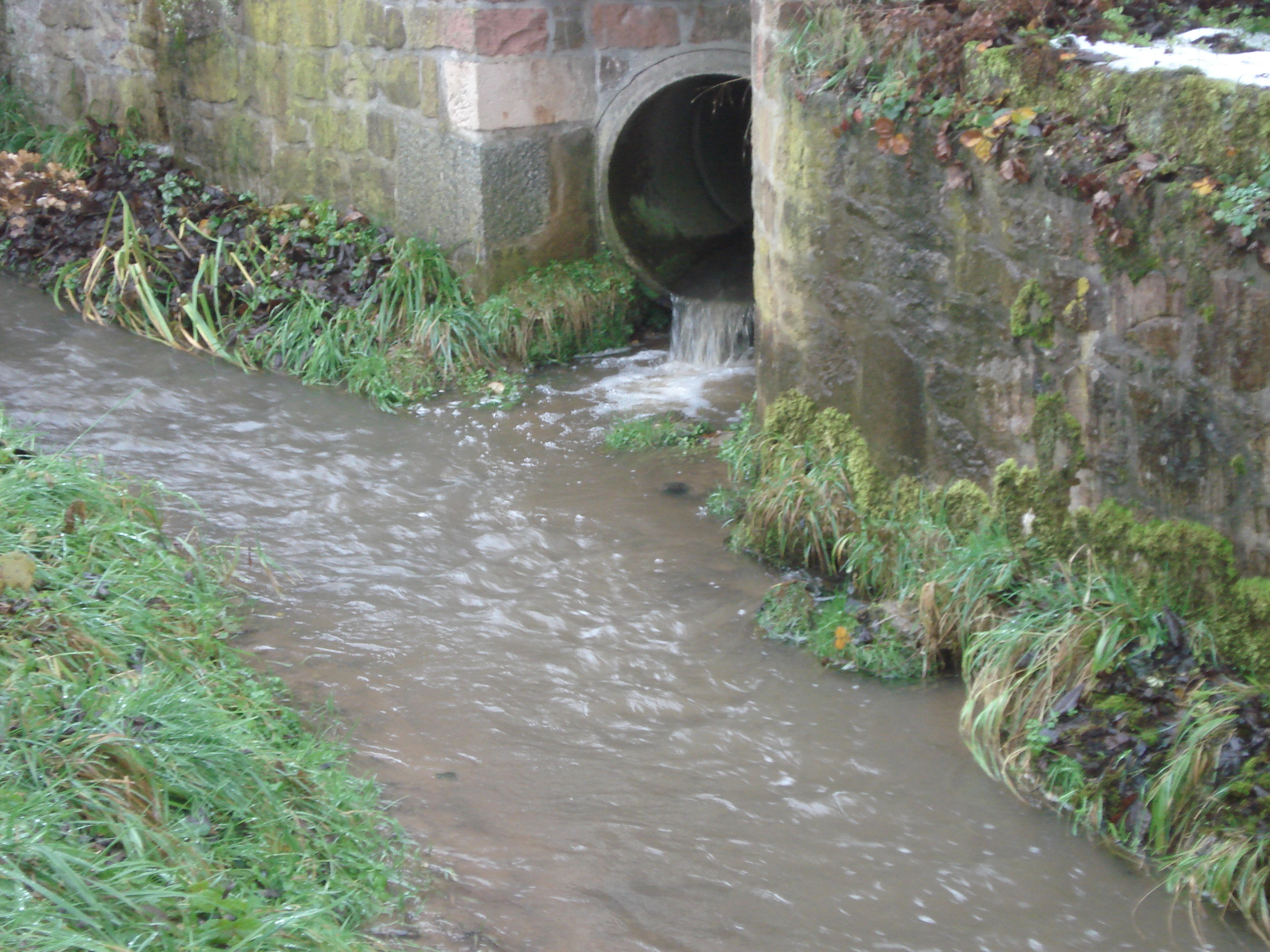
- Geographical centre point of the European Union marked by the flag pole on the bank of the Schulzengrundbach in Westerngrund-Oberwestern The Schulzengrundbach flows through a tube into the Westerbach

The Schulzengrundbach is a small river left of the Westerbach in Landkreis Aschaffenburg in the Bavarian Spessart in Germany.

== Location ==
Its source is east of Westerngrund-Oberwestern. It flows in a southwesterly direction through the Schulzengrund valley and discharges at Oberwestern into the Westerbach.

Since 1 July 2013 it became famous, when Croatia joined the European Union because the geographical centre of the European Union is located in a wet meadow left of the Schulzengrundbach.
