= Querbach (Westerbach) =

River in Germany

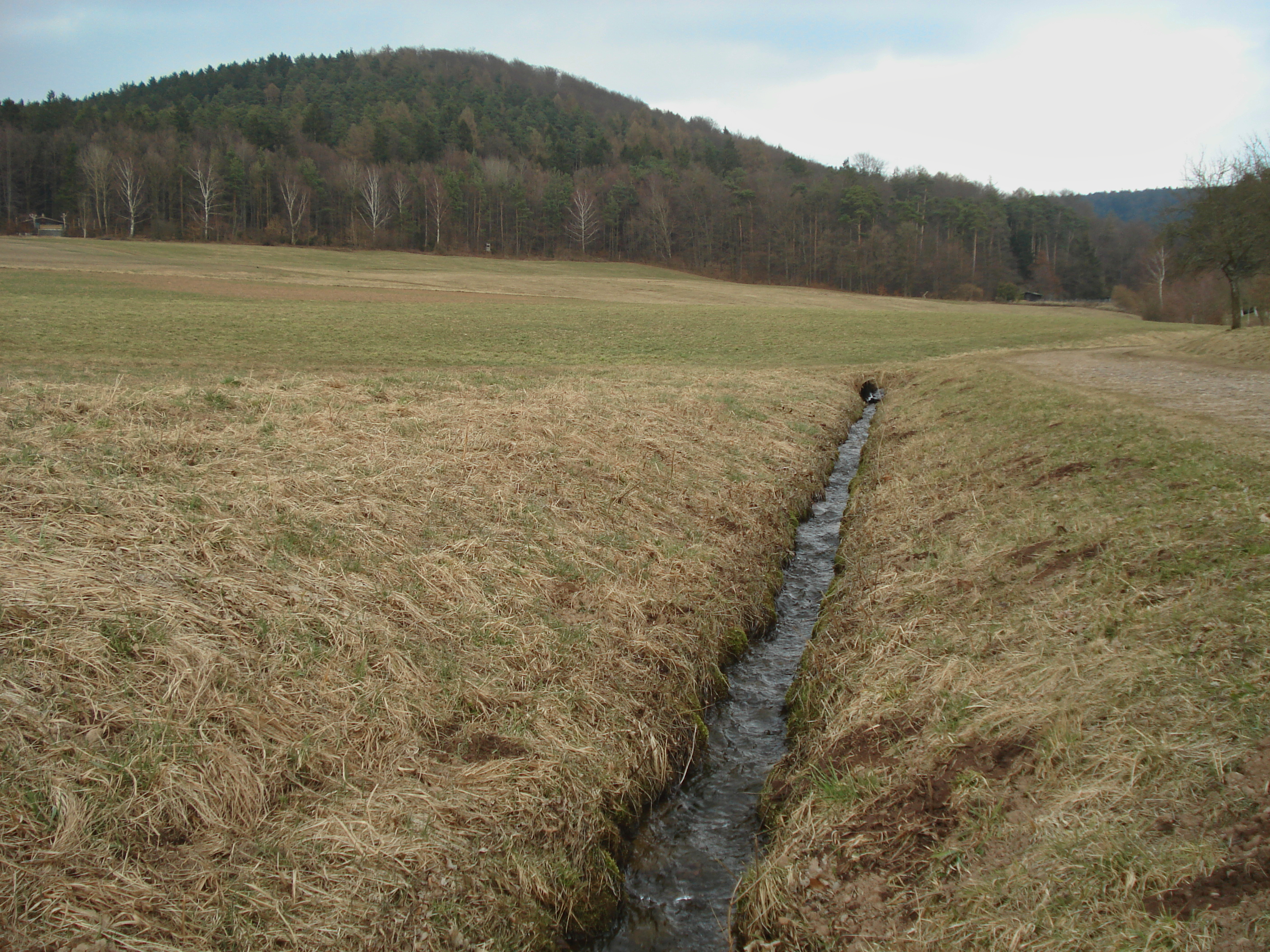
- The Querbach before Huckelheim, a neighbourhood of Westerngrund

- Location of mouth in Bavaria

Location
- Country: Germany
- State: Bavaria

Physical characteristics
- Source
  - coordinates: 50.1354°N 9.2626°E
- Mouth
  - location: confluence with the Huckelheimer Bach forming the Westerbach
  - coordinates: 50.1265°N 9.2403°E

Basin features
- Progression: Westerbach→ Kahl→ Main→ Rhine→ North Sea

The Querbach (German pronunciation: [ˈkveːɐ̯bax]) is a river of Bavaria, Germany and the left headwater of the Westerbach.

The Querbach rises in the Arzborn (sometimes called Atzborn), a larger spring on the Hoher Querberg (474 m). It is located northeast of Westerngrund, in the Atzborn forest area, near the state border with Hesse. The spring water flows from a small opening on the mountainside.

The Querbach runs in a southwesterly direction to Huckelheim where it unites with the Huckelheimer Bach to form the Westerbach.

== See also ==
- List of rivers of Bavaria
