= Gunzenbach =

Gunzenbach may refer to:

- Gunzenbach (Hohlenbach), a river of a river of Bavaria, Germany, tributary of the Hohlenbach
- Gunzenbach, an Ortsteil of the community Mömbris, in Lower Franconia, Bavaria, Germany
