= Huckelheimer Bach =

River in Germany

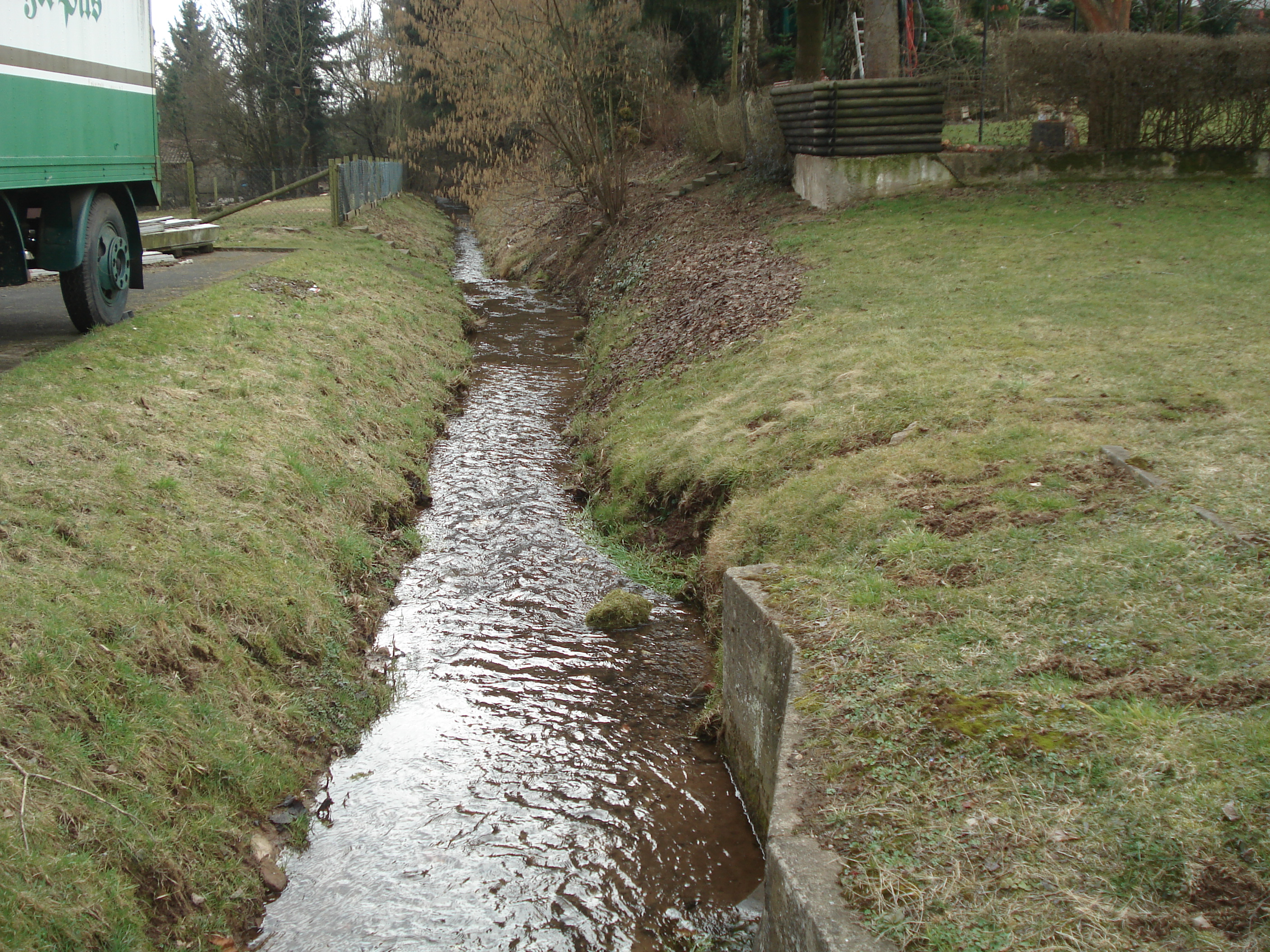
- The Huckelheimer Bach in the Gemarkung (traditional rural cadastral area) Huckelheim of Westerngrund

Location
- Country: Germany
- State: Bavaria

Physical characteristics
- Source
  - location: North of Huckelheim (a Gemarkung of Westerngrund)
  - coordinates: 50.1392°N 9.2400°E
- Mouth
  - location: confluence with the Querbach forming the Westerbach
  - coordinates: 50.1265°N 9.2403°E

Basin features
- Progression: Westerbach→ Kahl→ Main→ Rhine→ North Sea

The Huckelheimer Bach is a small river of Bavaria, Germany. It is the right headwater of the Westerbach in Westerngrund.

== See also ==
- List of rivers of Bavaria
