= Schützbach =

River in Germany

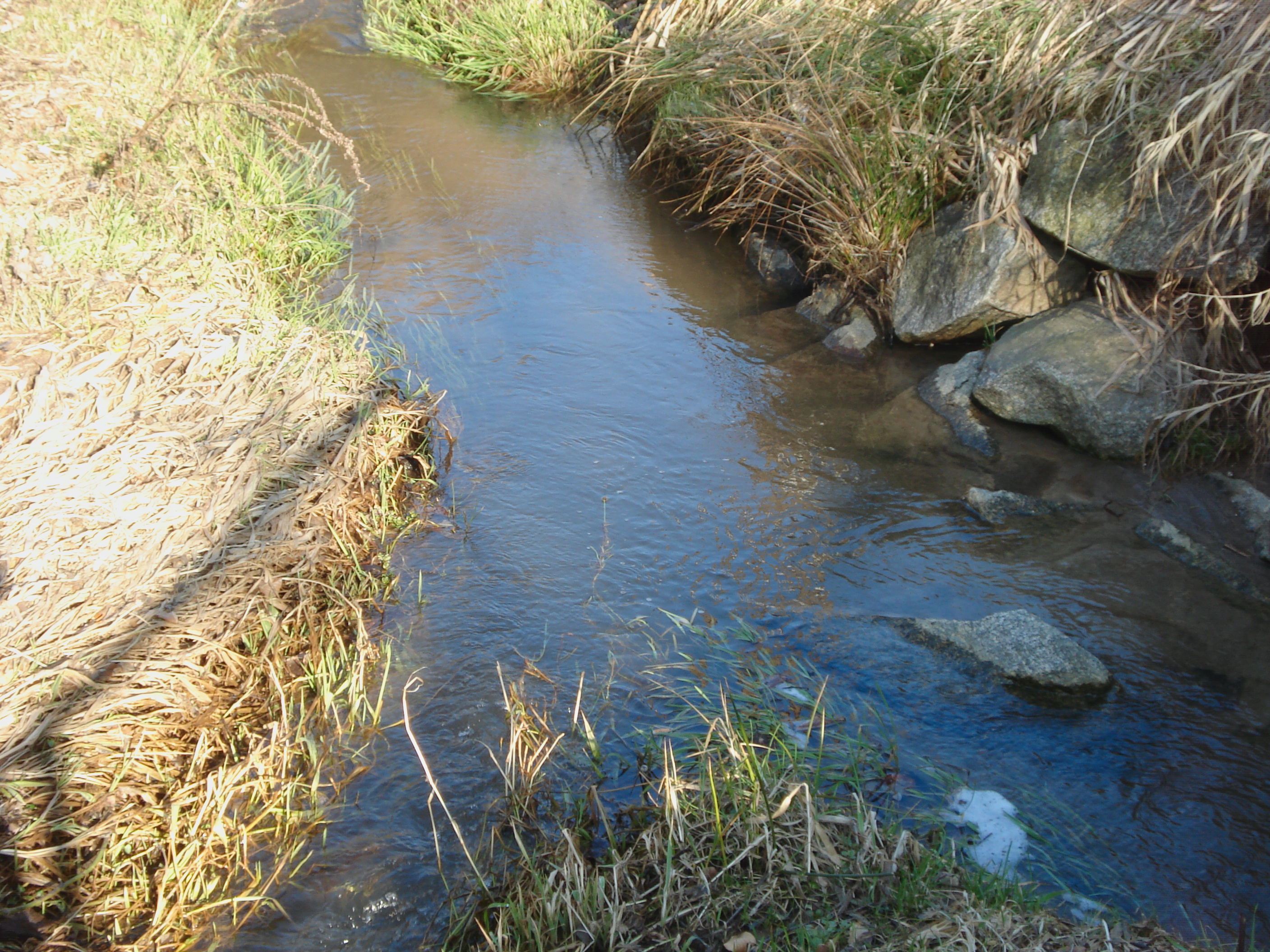
- Confluence of the Schützbach (bottom left) and the Kirchengrundbach (bottom right) to the Reichenbach (top)

Location
- Country: Germany
- States: Bavaria

Physical characteristics
- Mouth
  - location: Reichenbach
  - coordinates: 50.0437°N 9.1398°E

Basin features
- Progression: Reichenbach→ Kahl→ Main→ Rhine→ North Sea

Schützbach is a small river of Bavaria, Germany. It is the left source river of the Reichenbach near Mömbris.

== See also ==
- List of rivers of Bavaria
