= Geiselbach (river) =

River in Germany

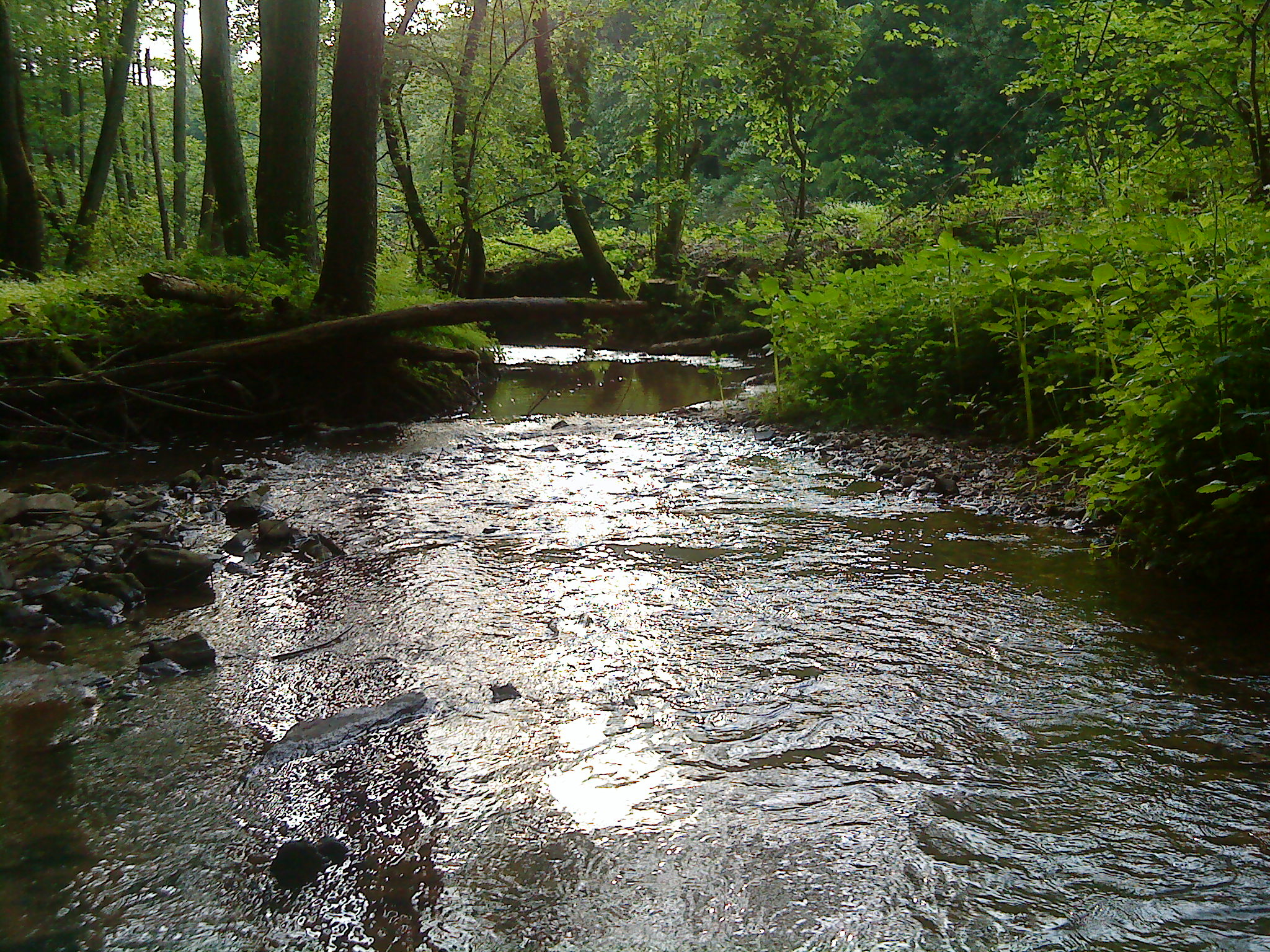
- The Geiselbach in Teufelsgrund

Location
- Country: Germany
- States: Bavaria and Hesse
- Reference no.: DE: 247728

Physical characteristics
- Source
  - location: near Geiselbach
  - coordinates: 50°07′27″N 9°12′29″E
- Mouth
  - location: near Niedersteinbach in the Kahl
  - coordinates: 50°05′32″N 9°08′31″E
- Length: 6.5 km (4.0 mi)

Basin features
- Progression: Kahl→ Main→ Rhine→ North Sea
- Tributaries
  - left: Omersbach

The Geiselbach is a right tributary of the Kahl in the northern Spessart mountainous range in Bavaria and Hesse, Germany. It is 5.2 km (3.2 mi) long and begins at the confluence of multiple headstreams in Geiselbach. The largest tributary is the Omersbach. It discharges near the Teufelsmühle ("Devil's Mill"). The Geiselbach flows through the Teufelsgrund ("Devil's Valley") to Hüttelngesäß and forms the border between Hesse and Bavaria. Near the village Brücken it empties into the Kahl.

Together with the Westerbach, Sommerkahl and Reichenbach, the Geiselbach is one of the largest tributaries of the Kahl.

== Tributaries ==
- Omersbach (left)

== Gallery ==
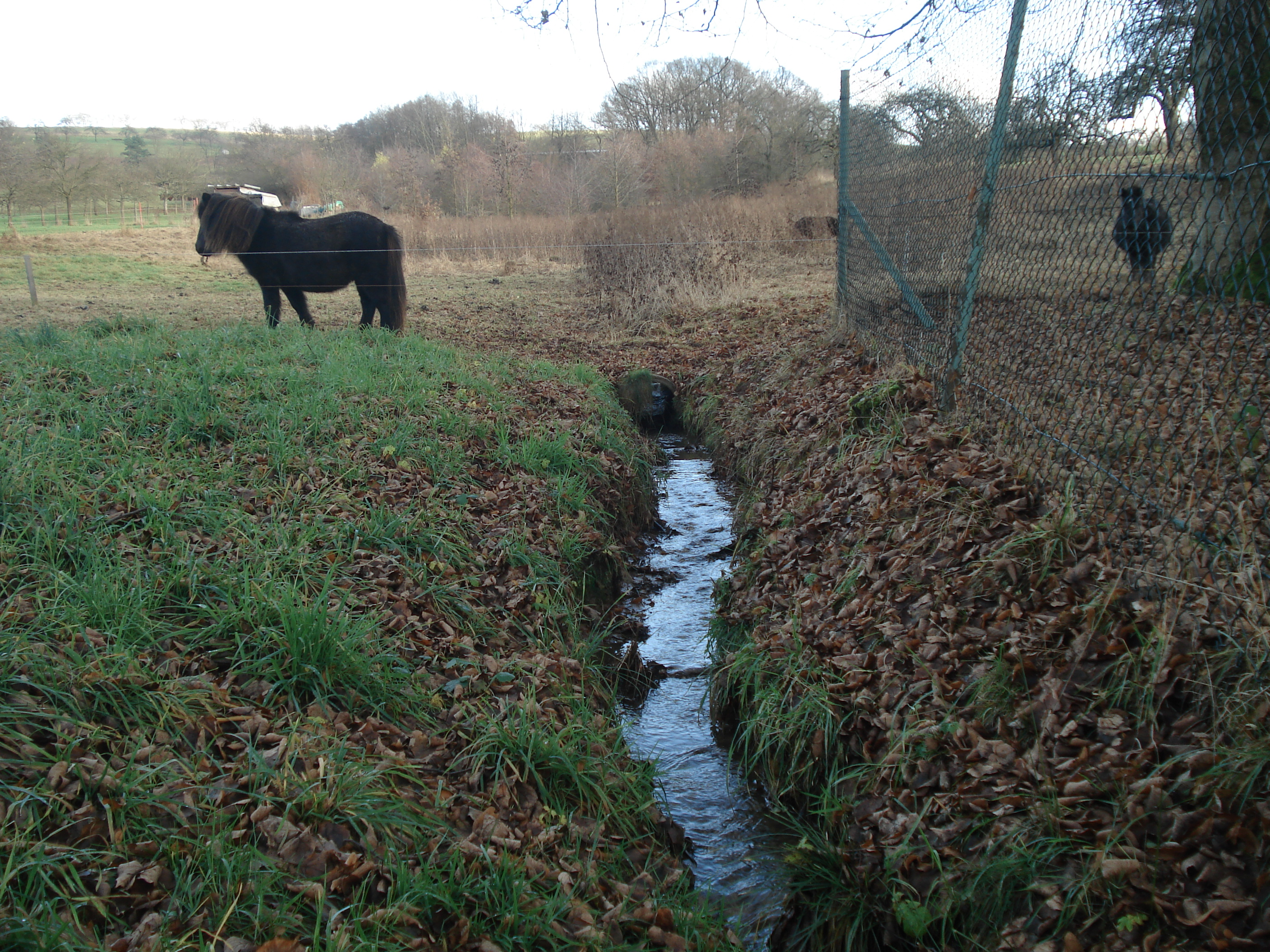
A headstream of the Geiselbach

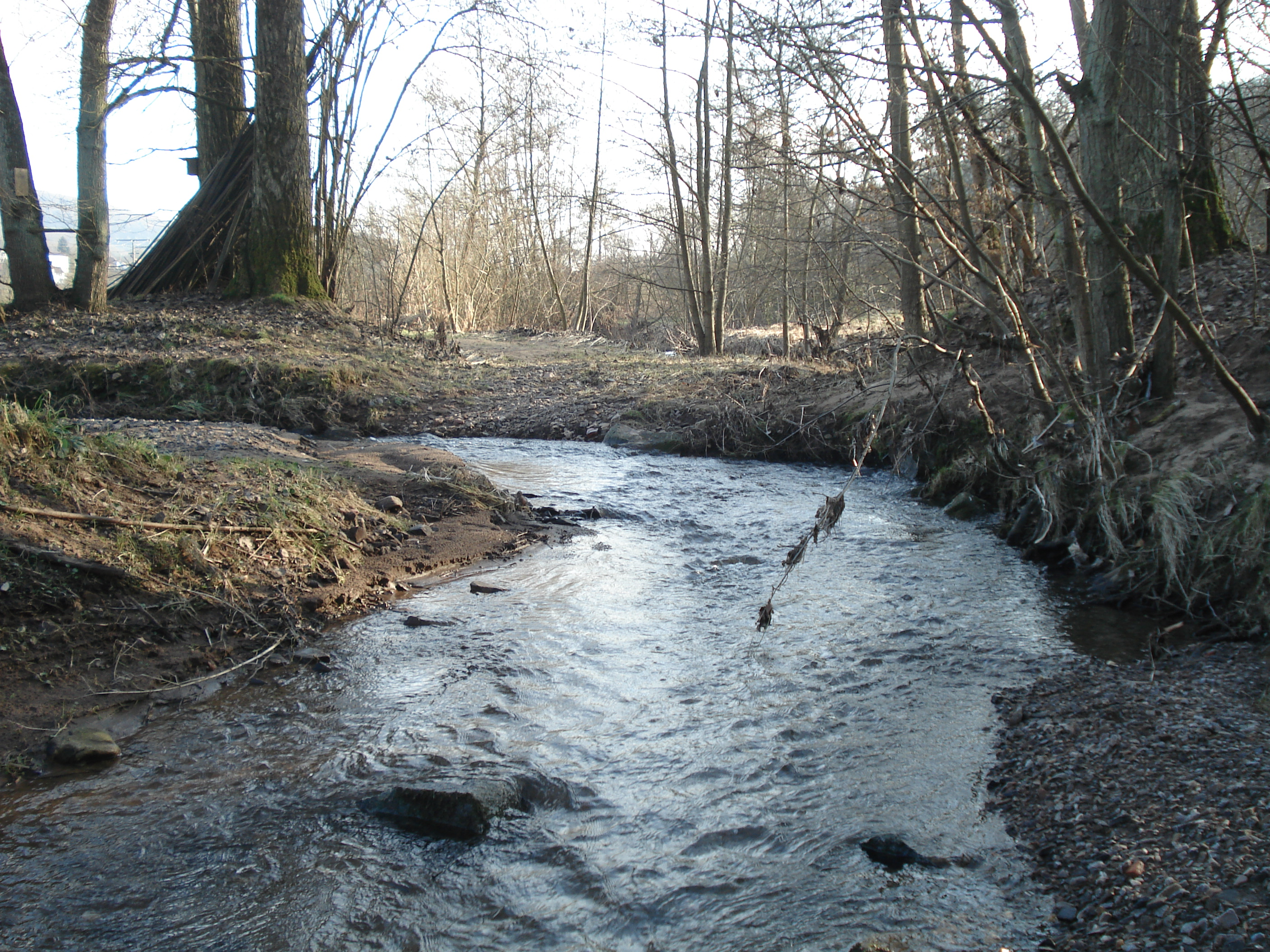
Near Hüttelngesäß

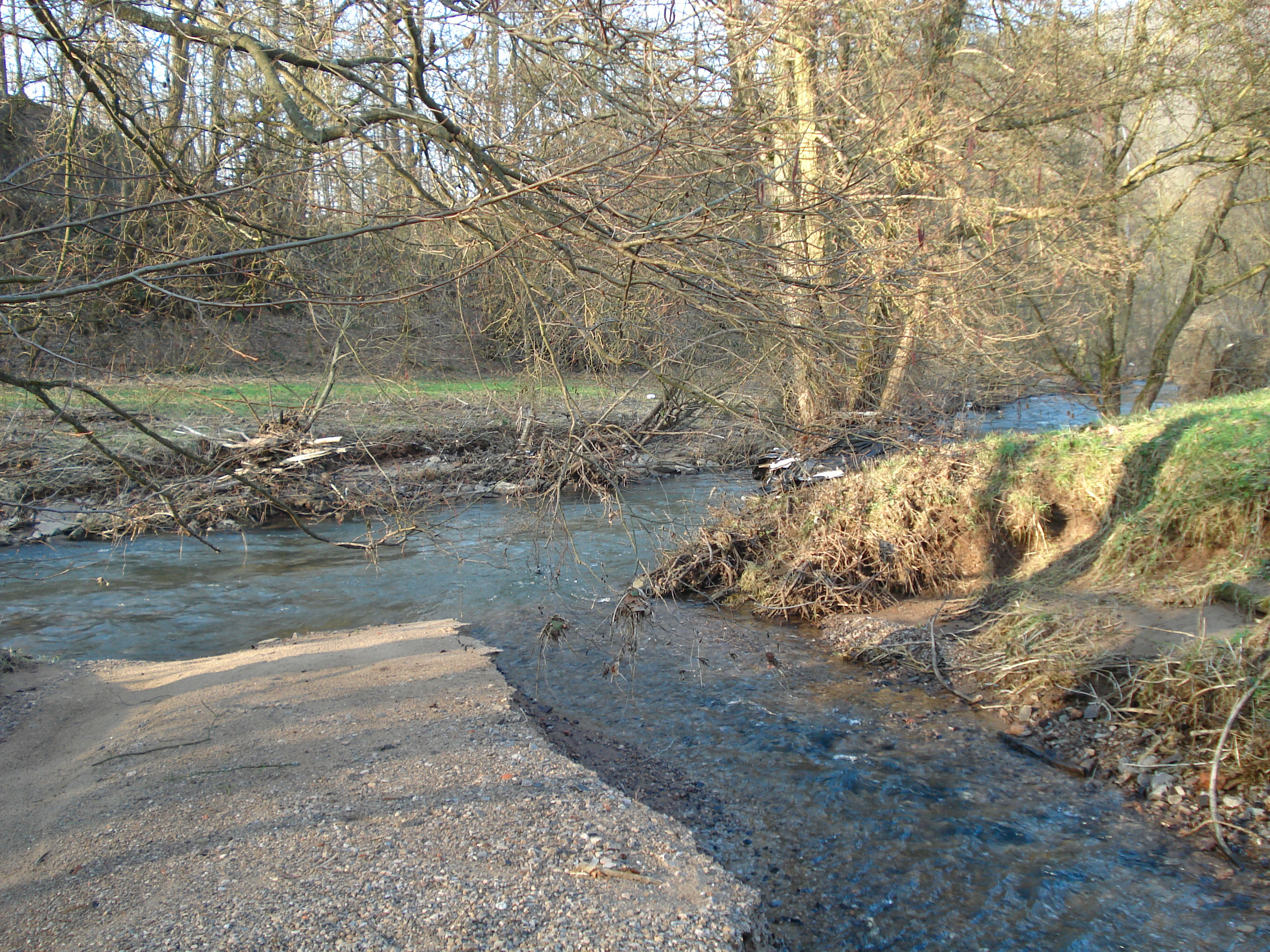
The mouth in the Kahl
