= Reichenbach (Kahl) =

River in Germany

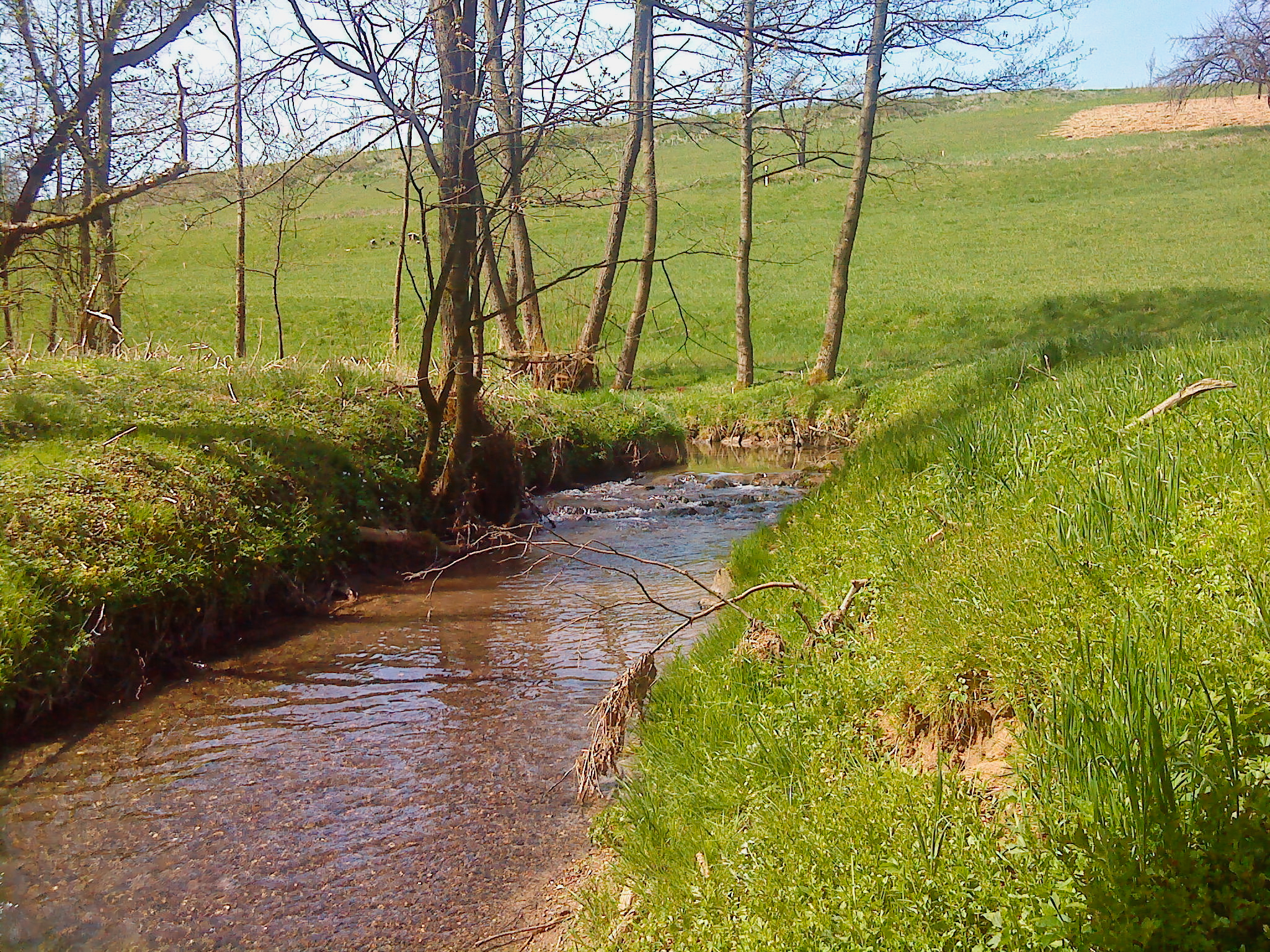
- The Reichenbach near the mill Heimbacher Mühle at Mömbris

Location
- Country: Germany
- State: Bavaria
- Reference no.: DE: 247726

Physical characteristics
- Source
  - location: Confluence of Schützbach and Kirchengrundbach in Reichenbach
  - coordinates: 50°02′38″N 9°08′24″E
- Mouth
  - location: near Mömbris in the Kahl
  - coordinates: 50°03′47″N 9°10′44″E
- Length: 5.0 km (3.1 mi) (with Schützbach)

Basin features
- Progression: Kahl→ Main→ Rhine→ North Sea

The Reichenbach is a left tributary of the Kahl in the northern Spessart in Lower Franconia, Bavaria, Germany. It is 5 km (3.1 mi) long and begins at the confluence of Schützbach and Kirchengrundbach in Reichenbach. Near Mömbris the Reichenbach empties in the Kahl.

Together with Westerbach, Sommerkahl and Geiselbach, the Reichenbach is one of the largest tributaries of the Kahl.

== Tributaries ==
- Schützbach (left headstream)
- Kirchengrundbach (right headstream)
- Steinbach (right)
- Hohlenbach (left)
- Heimbach (left)

== See also ==
- List of rivers of Bavaria
