= Omersbach =

River in Bavaria, Germany

- The Omersbach shortly before the Falkenbach joins

Location
- Country: Germany
- State: Bavaria

Physical characteristics
- Mouth
  - location: Geiselbach
  - coordinates: 50°6′19″N 9°9′48″E

Basin features
- Progression: Geiselbach→ Kahl→ Main→ Rhine→ North Sea
- Tributaries
  - left: Falkenbach

Omersbach is a small river of Bavaria, Germany. It flows into the Geiselbach north of Mömbris.

== See also ==
- List of rivers of Bavaria
