= Schneppenbach (Westerbach) =

River in Germany

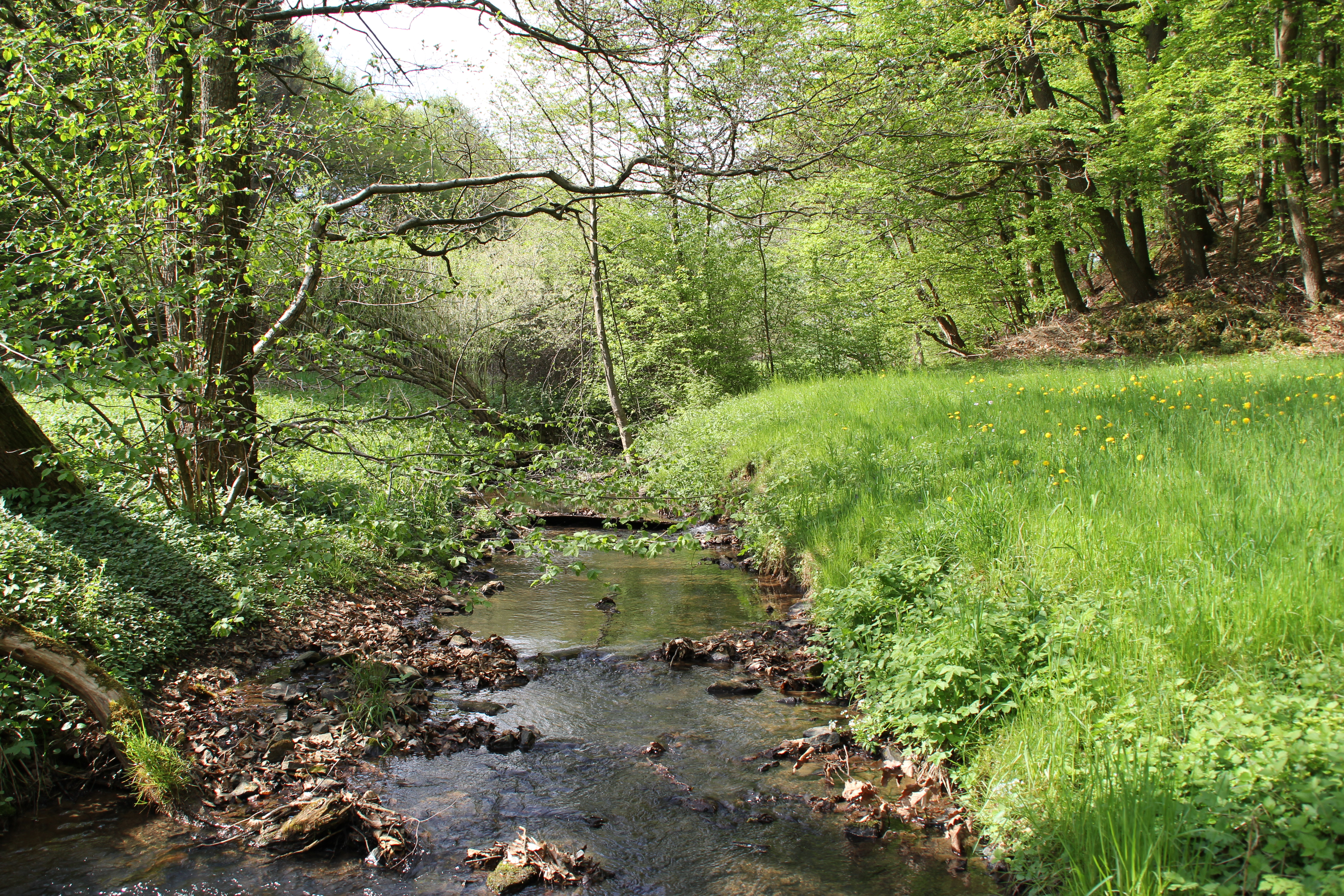
- The Schneppenbach between Hofstädten (a neighborhood of Schöllkrippen) und Schneppenbach

Location
- Country: Germany
- State: Bavaria

Physical characteristics
- Mouth
  - location: Westerbach
  - coordinates: 50.0949°N 9.2435°E

Basin features
- Progression: Westerbach→ Kahl→ Main→ Rhine→ North Sea
- Tributaries
  - right: Weizenbach

Schneppenbach is a river of Bavaria, Germany. It is a right tributary of the Westerbach near Schöllkrippen.

== Name ==
The name Schneppenbach comes from the old words sneppen and bach, which means faster brook. The brook gave the place Schneppenbach its name.

== See also ==
- List of rivers of Bavaria
