= Kirchengrundbach =

River in Germany

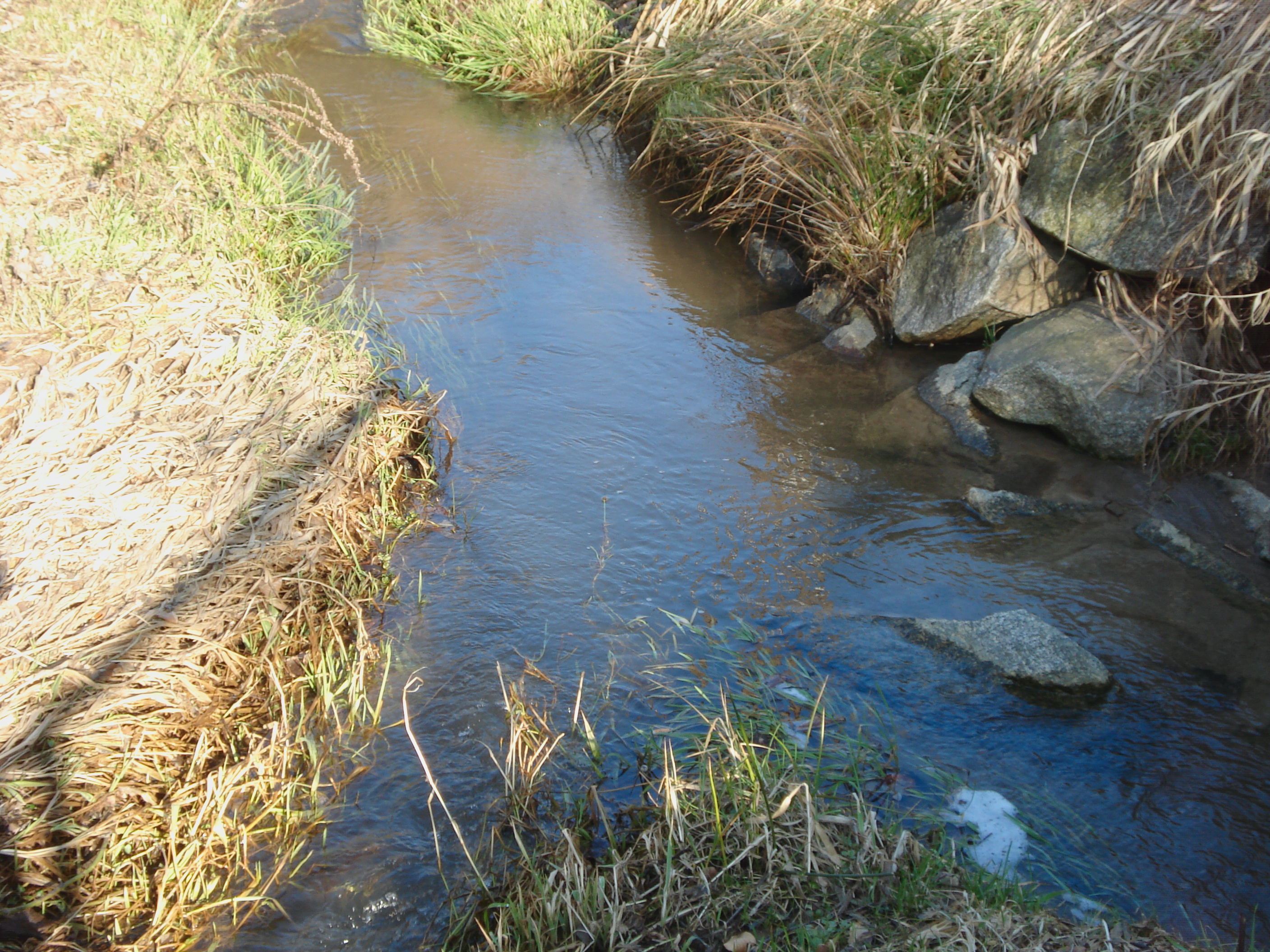
- Confluence of the Kirchengrundbach (bottom right) and Schützbach (bottom left) to the Reichenbach (top)

Location
- Country: Germany
- States: Bavaria

Physical characteristics
- Mouth
  - location: Reichenbach
  - coordinates: 50.0437°N 9.1398°E

Basin features
- Progression: Reichenbach→ Kahl→ Main→ Rhine→ North Sea

Kirchengrundbach is a small river of Landkreis Aschaffenburg, Lower Franconia, Bavaria, Germany. It is a right tributary of the Reichenbach near Mömbris.

== See also ==
- List of rivers of Bavaria
