= Steinbach (Reichenbach) =

River in Germany

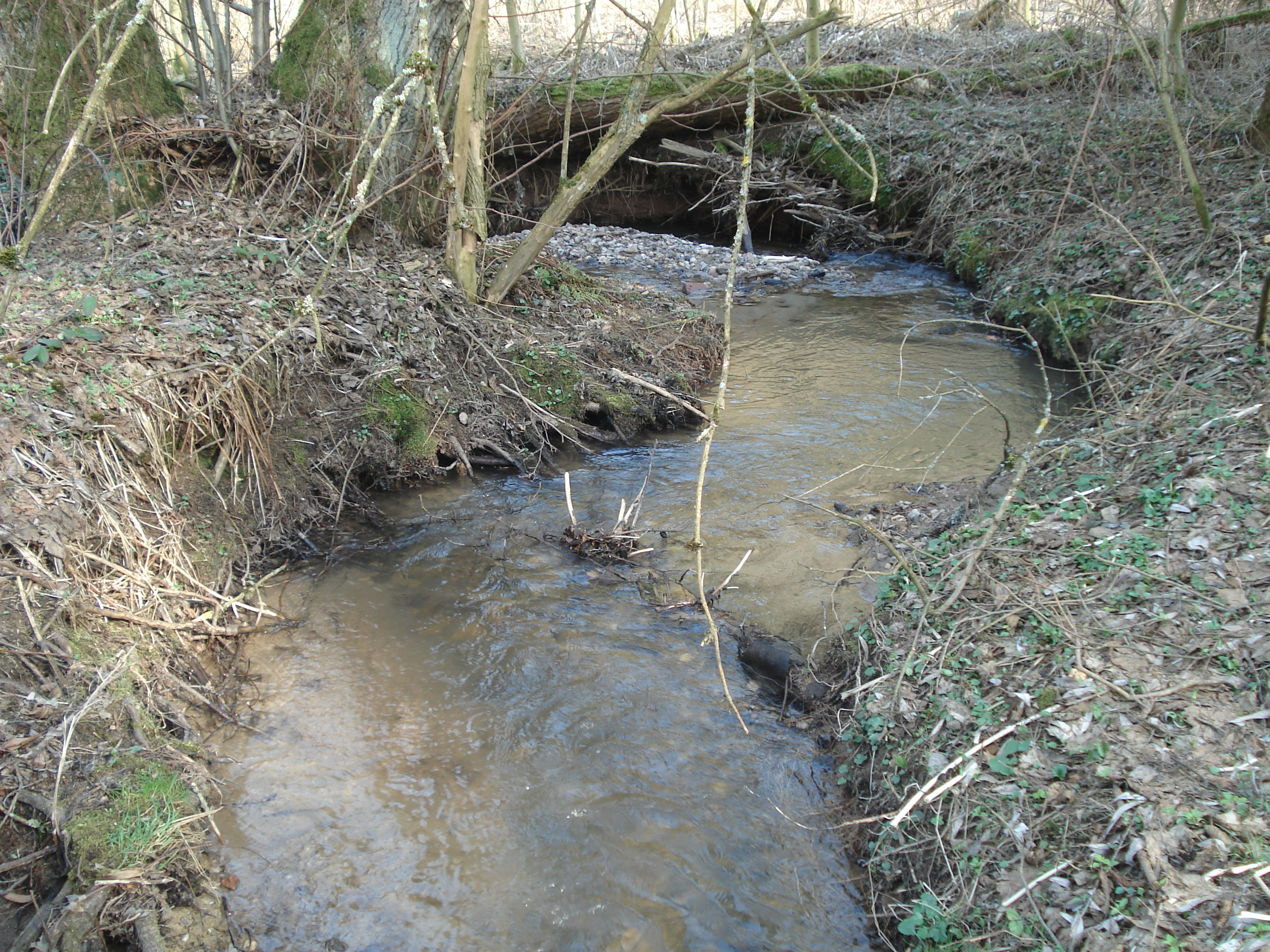
- The Steinbach near the Heimbacher Mühle

Location
- Country: Germany
- State: Bavaria

Physical characteristics
- Mouth
  - location: Reichenbach
  - coordinates: 50°02′54″N 9°09′08″E

Basin features
- Progression: Reichenbach→ Kahl→ Main→ Rhine→ North Sea

Steinbach is a small river of Bavaria, Germany. It is a right tributary of the Reichenbach near Mömbris.

== See also ==
- List of rivers of Bavaria
