= Hohlenbach =

River in Germany

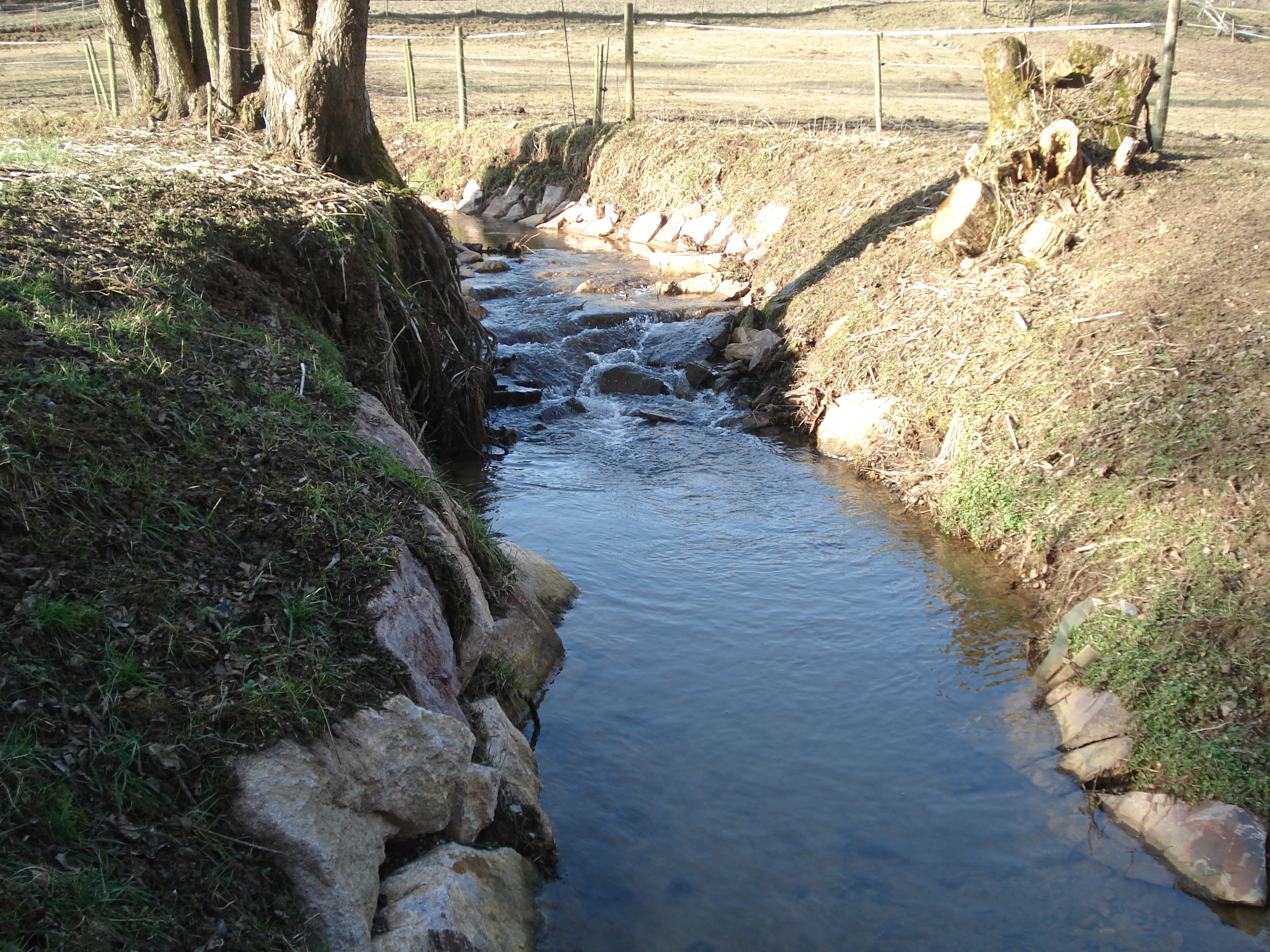
- The Hohlenbach at the mill Heimbacher Mühle

Location
- Country: Germany
- States: Bavaria

Physical characteristics
- Mouth
  - location: Reichenbach
  - coordinates: 50°02′58″N 09°09′19″E

Basin features
- Progression: Reichenbach→ Kahl→ Main→ Rhine→ North Sea
- Tributaries
  - left: Gunzenbach

Hohlenbach is a small river of Bavaria, Germany. It flows into the Reichenbach near Mömbris.

== See also ==
- List of rivers of Bavaria
