= Westerngrund =

- Municipality
- Coat of arms

- Location of Westerngrund within Aschaffenburg district
- Interactive map of Westerngrund
- Location within Germany Location within Bavaria
- Coordinates: 50°06′N 09°15′E
- Country: Germany
- State: Bavaria
- Admin. region: Unterfranken
- District: Aschaffenburg
- Municipal assoc.: Schöllkrippen
- Subdivisions: 3 Ortsteile

Government
  - Mayor (2020–26): Brigitte Heim

Area
  - Total: 14.77 km^{2} (5.70 sq mi)
- Elevation: 300 m (980 ft)

Population (2025-12-31)
  - Total: 1,945
  - Density: 131.7/km^{2} (341.1/sq mi)
- Time zone: UTC+01:00 (CET)
  - Summer (DST): UTC+02:00 (CEST)
- Postal codes: 63825
- Dialling codes: 06024
- Vehicle registration: AB
- Website: www.gemeinde-westerngrund.de

Westerngrund is a municipality in the Aschaffenburg district in the Regierungsbezirk of Lower Franconia (Unterfranken) in Bavaria, Germany, and a member of the Verwaltungsgemeinschaft (Administrative Community) of Schöllkrippen. From 2013 to 2020, the geodetic centre of the European Union was located within the municipality's boundaries.

== Geography ==
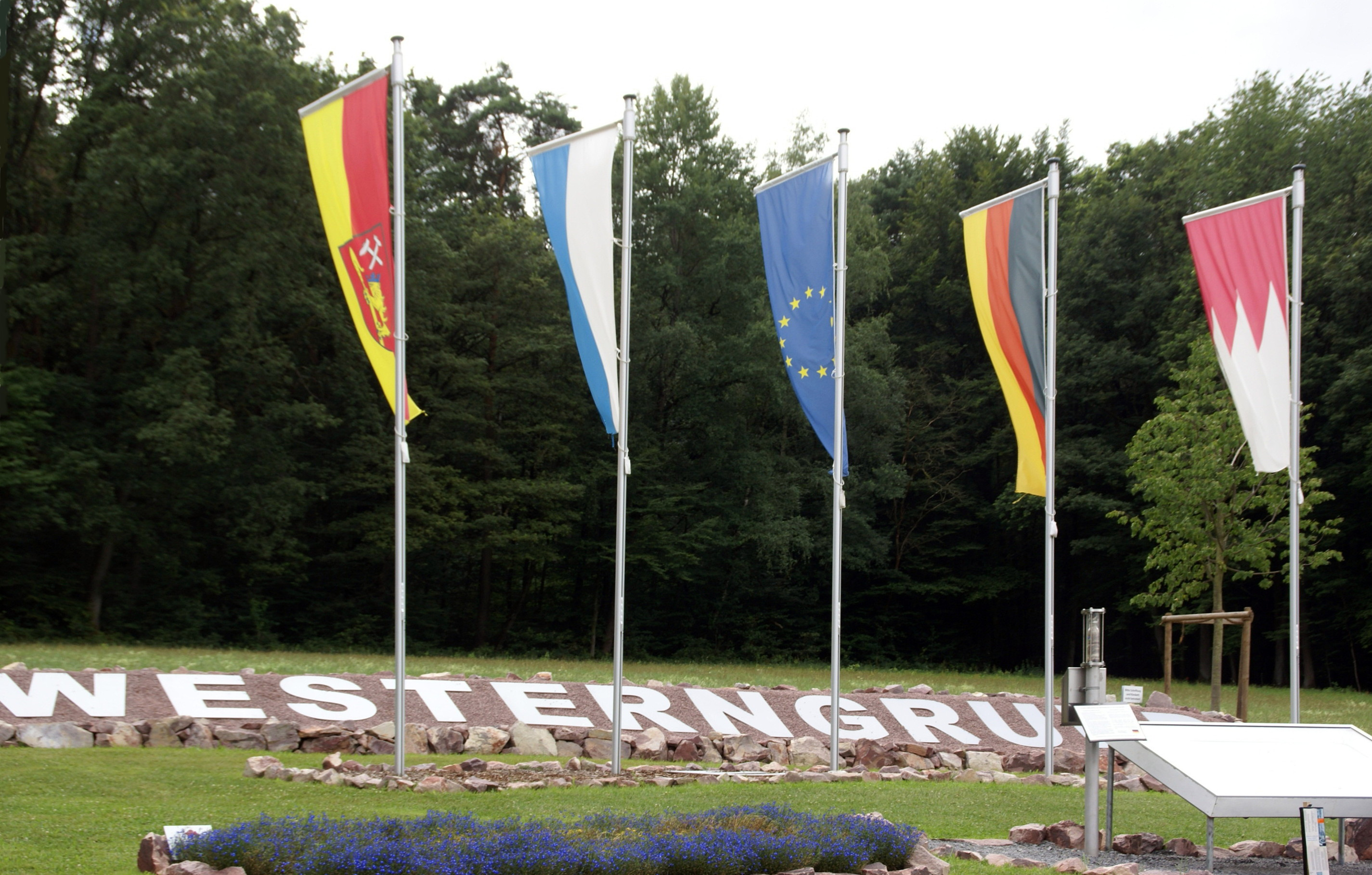
The former centre of the European Union

Gemeindeteile

The municipality lies in the Bavarian Lower Main (Bayerischer Untermain). With the accession of Croatia to the European Union on 1 July 2013 the geodetic centre of the EU shifted to Westerngrund. It moved again on 1 January 2014 (when Mayotte joined the EU) but remained within the municipality's borders. A monument site has been set up. On 31 January 2020, as a result of the withdrawal of the United Kingdom from the European Union, the geodetic centre of the European Union moved from Westerngrund to Gadheim, approximately eighty kilometres (fifty miles) away.

The municipality has the following Gemarkungen (traditional rural cadastral areas): Oberwestern, Unterwestern, Huckelheim.

== History ==
Today's municipality of Westerngrund mainly comprises areas that belonged to the Schönborn Amt of Krombach, which in 1806 was mediatized with the newly formed Principality of Aschaffenburg, with which it passed in 1814 (by this time it had become a department of the Grand Duchy of Frankfurt) to the Kingdom of Bavaria. In the course of administrative reform in Bavaria, the current municipality came into being with the Gemeindeedikt (“Municipal Edict”) of 1818.

== Demographics ==
Within municipality limits in 1970, 1,454 inhabitants were counted, in 1987 1,584 and in 2000 1,918.

== Governance ==
The mayor is Brigitte Heim (WIR).

=== Coat of arms ===
The municipality's arms might be described thus: Gules a demi-lion rampant armed, langued and crowned azure Or issuant from the base, in his gambes a shepherd's staff in pale of the second, in chief sinister two miner's hammers in saltire argent.

Westerngrund has only existed as a municipality since 1972, having been assembled out of the formerly separate municipalities of Huckelheim, Oberwestern and Unterwestern, which all lie in the so-called Westerngrund, a steep-sided dale that became the municipality's namesake. The lion in the arms, and also the tinctures, were taken from the arms borne by the Counts of Schönborn, who held the area until the Old Empire's downfall in 1803. The staff held by the lion is a symbol of Saint Wendelin, the municipality's patron saint. The crossed miner's hammers stand for the former silver and copper mining in the centre of Huckelheim.

The municipality has borne the arms since 24 March 1980.

== Economy ==
Municipal tax revenue amounted in 1999 to €661,000 (converted), of which net business taxes accounted for €28,000.

According to official statistics, there were 74 workers on the social welfare contribution rolls working in producing businesses in 1998. In trade and transport this was 0. In other areas, 715 such workers worked from home. Three businesses were in processing. Two businesses were in construction, and furthermore, in 1999, there were 30 agricultural operations with a working area of 722 ha, of which 408 ha was cropland and 313 ha was meadowland.

== Education ==
In 1999 the following institutions existed in Westerngrund:

- Kindergartens: 75 places with 72 children

== See also ==
- Kahlgrund
