= Bertrand de La Tour (disambiguation) =

Bertrand de La Tour (died 1332/3) was a French Franciscan friar and cardinal of the Catholic Church.

Bertrand de La Tour may also refer to:

- Bertrand de La Tour (died 1382), bishop of Puy and Toul
- Bertrand IV of La Tour (fl. 1353–1423), count of Auvergne
- Bertrand V of La Tour (died 1461), count of Auvergne
- Bertrand VI of La Tour (died 1497), count of Auvergne
