= House of La Tour d'Auvergne =

French noble family

Coat of arms of Emmanuel-Théodose de La Tour d'Auvergne

The House of La Tour d'Auvergne (French: [la tuʁ dovɛʁɲ]) was a French noble dynasty. Its senior branch, extinct in 1501, held two of the last large fiefs acquired by the French crown, the counties of Auvergne and Boulogne, for about half a century. Its cadet branch, extinct in 1802, ruled the Duchy of Bouillon in the Southern Netherlands from 1594, and held the dukedoms of Albret and Château-Thierry in the peerage of France since 1660. The name was also borne by Philippe d'Auvergne, an alleged collateral of the original Counts of Auvergne, and was adopted by the famous soldier Théophile Corret de la Tour d'Auvergne, who descended from an illegitimate line of the family.

== Senior line: counts of Auvergne and Boulogne ==
Personal coat of arms of the counts of Auvergne and Boulogne from the House of la Tour d'Auvergne.

Although various La Tours are mentioned in the documents from the 11th and 12th century, the family history remains unclear until the 13th century, when they owned the Lordship of la Tour in the County of Auvergne, hence the name.

The medieval family was related through marriages to other notable families of the French south, including Ventadour, La Rochefoucauld, and Levis-Mirepoix.

The la Tours d'Auvergne maintained close ties to the Avignon popes, and many of them became bishops and cardinals, particularly after 1352, when Guy de la Tour married Marthe Rogier of Beaufort, Pope Gregory XI's niece and Clement VI's grand niece. Their son Bertrand IV of La Tour (1375–1423) married a rich heiress, Marie I, Countess of Auvergne, in 1389, with their son Bertrand V of La Tour succeeding as Count of Auvergne and Boulogne in 1437.

Bertrand V's grandson Jean III de la Tour d'Auvergne (1467–1501) was the last medieval Count of Auvergne, Boulogne, and Lauraguais. By his marriage to Jeanne of Bourbon-Vendôme, he had two daughters:

- The elder daughter, Anne de la Tour d'Auvergne, married John Stewart, 2nd Duke of Albany, but died childless.
- The younger, Madeleine de la Tour d'Auvergne, married Lorenzino de Medici and gave birth to Catherine de' Medici, who inherited both Auvergne and Boulogne, when Anne died childless. Catherine also became Queen of France.

John's elder sister, Jeanne de la Tour d'Auvergne, married Aymar de Poitiers. They were the grandparents of Diane de Poitiers, mistress of King Henry II of France.

The cadet line of this family, extinct in 1497, also owned the Lordship of Montgascon. Anne de la Tour d'Auvergne, the last of this line and heiress to this lordship, married three times:

- firstly, in 1506, to Charles of Bourbon, Count of Roussillon.
- secondly, in 1510, to John of Montmorency, lord of Chantilly.
- thirdly, in 1518, to her distant cousin, Francis II de la Tour, Viscount of Turenne. For her issue by the last marriage, see below.

== Junior line: viscounts of Turenne and princes of Sedan ==
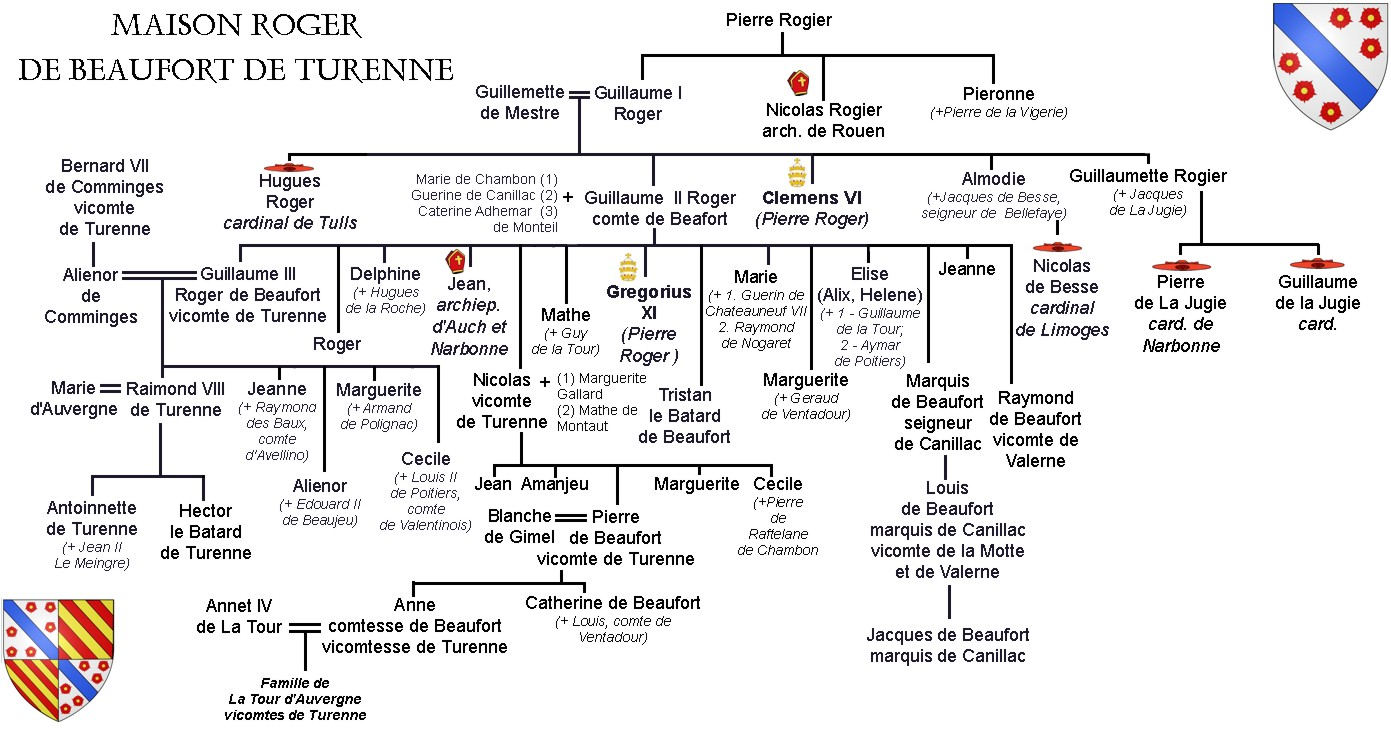
Family de Beaufort-Turenne in the 14th and 15th century.

Coat of arms of viscountcy of Turenne, duchy of Boullon, principality of Sedan: blazon (French): écartelé, en 1 et 4 d'azur semé de fleurs de lys d'or et à la tour d'argent maçonnée et ouverte de sable (qui est de La Tour), en 2 d'or au trois tourteaux de gueules (qui est Boulogne), et 3 coticé d'or et de gueules de 8 pièces (qui est Turenne), sur le tout parti d'or au gonfanon de gueules frangé de sinople (qui est Auvergne) et de gueules à la fasce d'argent (qui est Bouillon)

Bertrand de La Tour d'Auvergne, owner of Olliergues and several other seigneuries, was the author of the junior line of the family.

He died in 1329 and was buried in Clermont-Ferrand. His great-grandson William de la Tour became bishop of Rodez and Catholic Patriarch of Antioch. The latter's nephew, Agne IV of Oliergues, married in 1444 his cousin, viscountess Anne of Beaufort, succeeding to the viscounty of Turenne upon her death.

Among his children, the younger, Antony Raymond, lord of Murat, became the ancestor of the obscure line of la Tour-Apchier, which rose to prominence shortly before its extinction in the 19th century.

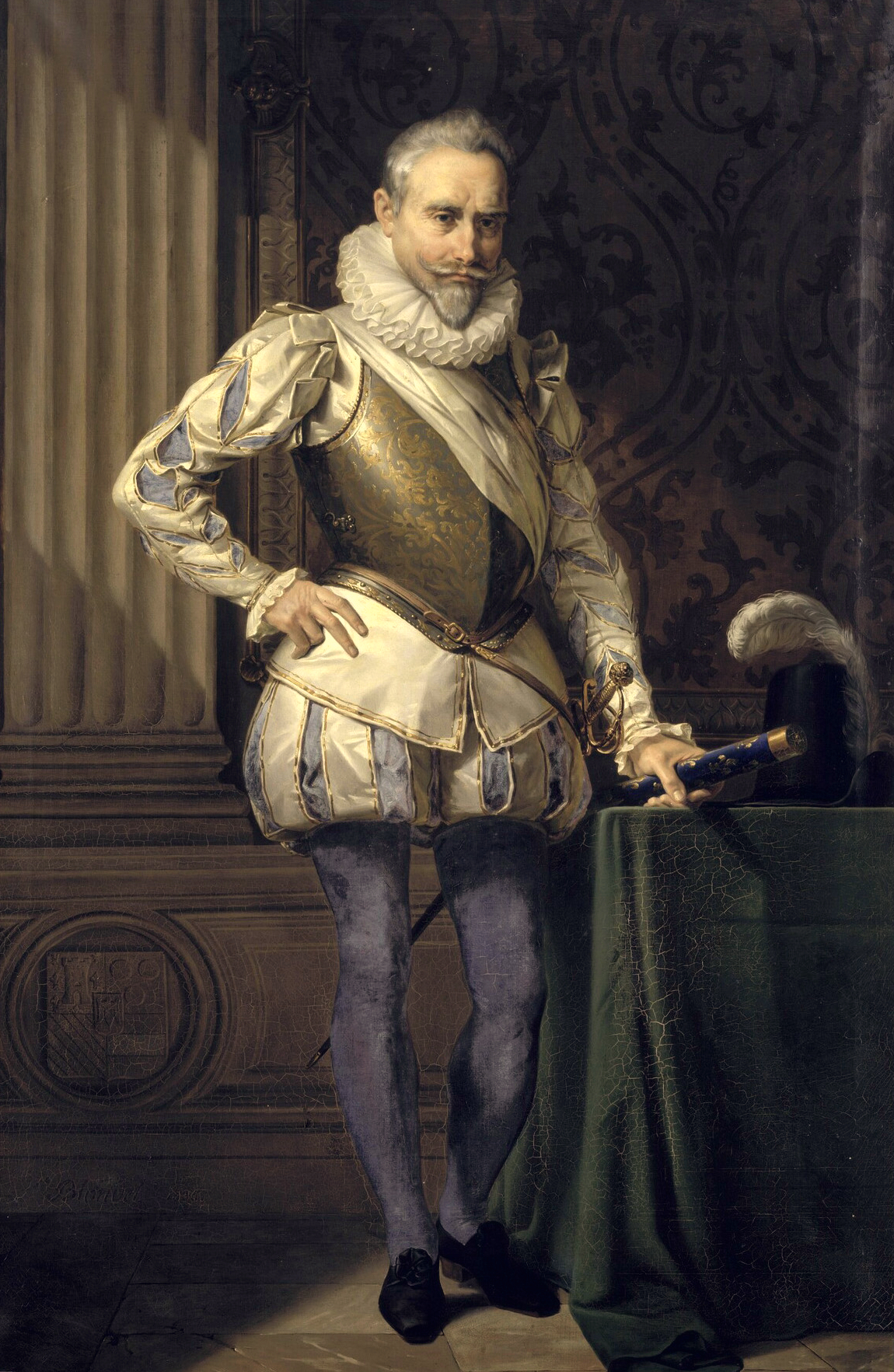
Henri de la Tour (1555-1623), Marshal of France

Agne IV's fifth and eldest surviving son, Anthony de la Tour, succeeded him as viscount of Turenne and had two children. The youngest, Gilles de la Tour, lord of Limeuil, had issue, including Isabeau of Limeuil, known as the mistress of Louis I de Bourbon, Prince de Condé and mother of his natural children.

Francis II de la Tour d'Auvergne, viscount of Turenne (1497–1532) was the eldest son of Anthony de la Tour and husband of Anne de la Tour de Montgascon (see above). Their grandson, Henry de la Tour d'Auvergne (1555–1623), is remembered as a faithful adherent of Henri IV's Huguenot cause and Marshal of France. His first wife was Charlotte de la Marck, heiress to the principality of Sedan and to the Duchy of Bouillon. Upon her death, Henry inherited her titles and dominions and remarried Elisabeth of Orange-Nassau, William the Silent's daughter.

Hoping to succeed the Orange leaders of the Netherlands, their son and heir Frederic Maurice of the Tour d'Auvergne (1605–1652) remained in the Dutch service until his marriage to Eléonore-Catherine-Fébronie de Wassenaar de Berg, which was effected against his family's wishes in 1634 and led to his conversion to Catholicism.

Compromised in the Cinq-Mars conspiracy, he was pardoned on condition that he would exchange his principalities of Sedan, Jametz, and Raucourt - highly important strategically - for the titles of Duke of Albret and Duke of Château-Thierry in the French peerage. This exchange was formalized in 1651. Although Frederic Maurice was promised to take rank from the original creation of the Duchy of Château-Thierry for Robert III of the Marck in 1527, this could never be effected due to vocal opposition of other dukes-peers.

The younger brother of Frédéric Maurice de La Tour d'Auvergne, Henri de La Tour d'Auvergne, vicomte de Turenne, (1611–1675), is remembered as the most illustrious member of the family. Louis XIV honored Turenne with a burial at the royal necropolis of Saint-Denis. Napoléon considered him to be one of the greatest military commanders of all time.

== Later history: Dukes of Bouillon and Albret ==
Frederic-Maurice's son, Godefroy Maurice de La Tour d'Auvergne (1641–1721), was the first member of his family to become a truly sovereign duke of Bouillon. This happened in 1678 when the Duchy of Bouillon was reconquered from the Spaniards by the Marshal de Créquy. Apart from his ducal titles, Godefroy-Maurice also held the title of Count of Évreux. He became the Grand Chamberlain of France in 1658 and governor of Auvergne in 1662. All these titles remained in the La Tour d'Auvergne family for more than a century.

The family were made Foreign Princes in France in 1651, which entitled them to the style of [Most Serene] Highness at the French court in which they lived.

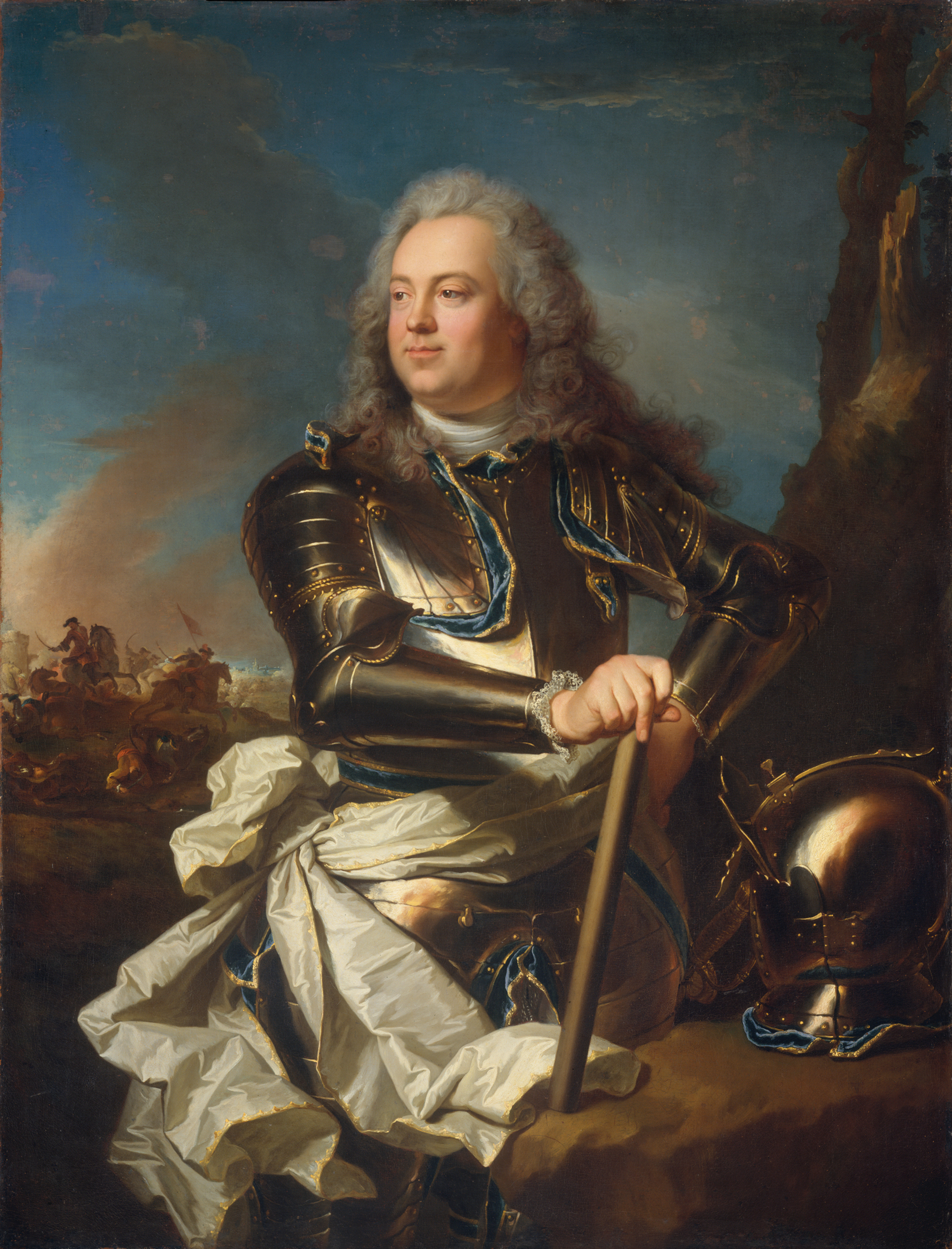
Louis Henri de La Tour d'Auvergne, comte d'Évreux, builder of Élysée Palace. Portrait by Hyacinthe Rigaud (ca. 1720), now in the Metropolitan Museum

Godefroy-Maurice's younger brother, Count Frederic Maurice de La Tour d'Auvergne (1642–1707), was a prominent general in the service of the Dutch. He married Henrietta von Hohenzollern (1648–1698), heiress to the marquessate of Bergen-op-Zoom, a title which passed to their children. After their line became extinct in 1732, Bergen devolved upon Count Palatine Johann Christian von Sulzbach (1700–1733), who had married an heiress, Marie Henriette Leopoldine de La Tour d'Auvergne, in 1722.

Godefroy-Maurice's wife, Marie Anne Mancini (1649–1714), best remembered for her literary pursuits and for her patronage of La Fontaine, was a niece of Cardinal Mazarin. Their eldest son Louis married the heiress to the dukedom of Ventadour but predeceased his parents. The Duchy of Bouillon and other titles passed to their second son, Emmanuel Théodose (1668–1730), whose fourth wife was Louise Henriette Françoise de Lorraine. Another son, Frédéric-Jules, Prince d'Auvergne (1672–1733), married an Irish adventuress.

Charles Godefroy de La Tour d'Auvergne (1706–1771) was Emmanuel-Théodose's son and the 5th Duke of Bouillon. His wife was his brother's widow, Maria Karolina Sobieska, the granddaughter of King John Sobieski of Poland. Their only daughter, Marie Louise Henriette Jeanne de La Tour, was a famous adventuress and was guillotined in 1793. Although officially married to Jules de Rohan, Duke of Montbazon, she had an illegitimate son who died in infancy with her cousin, Charles Edward Stuart, Jacobite claimant to the thrones of England and Scotland.

Her brother, Godefroy Charles Henri de La Tour d'Auvergne (1728–1792), was the 6th Duke of Bouillon. He married Louise de Lorraine, known as Mademoiselle de Marsan prior to their marriage. He served with distinction in the Seven Years' War and was elected to the Royal Academy of Sculpture and Painting in 1777. In the span of three months, he spent almost a million livres on his mistress, an opera singer, thus bringing his family to the verge of ruin. Although Godefroy embraced the French Revolution, the Duchy of Bouillon was annexed by the Republic within three years after his death. His only son, Jacques Léopold Charles Godefroy, incapacitated by a road accident, died in 1802, leaving no issue of his marriage to a Princess of Hesse-Rheinfels. This led the main line of the La Tour d'Auvergne family to end.

== Bouillon Succession ==
In 1780, the 6th Duke of Bouillon developed a friendship with Philippe d'Auvergne, a British naval officer imprisoned in France. As a family legend had it, the Dauvergne family represented a collateral branch of the ancient Counts of Auvergne, which had moved to the island of Jersey during the 13th century. In 1787, the 6th Duke recognized this connection and adopted Philippe d'Auvergne, calling on him to succeed to his own son if the latter were to die without male issue.

In 1809 Napoleon endorsed an arrangement, whereby the La Tour estates and liabilities pertaining to the 1651 exchange devolved upon the French state. The 6th Duke's Château de Navarre and the Hôtel d'Évreux in Paris were bequeathed to the Empress Josephine and her relatives. The Hôtel d'Évreux was subsequently renamed the Élysée Palace and currently serves as the official residence of the President of France. As for the Duchy of Bouillon, its citizens recognized Philippe d'Auvergne as their legitimate ruler and duke.

The Congress of Vienna, however, awarded the sovereignty of the duchy to the King of the Netherlands, whereas the private property holdings of the former dukes were to be redistributed by special arbitration either to Philippe d'Auvergne or to an Austrian claimant, Charles-Alain-Gabriel de Rohan-Guéméné, who was the last duke's closest relative in the female line. The issue was eventually settled in Rohan's favor. Philippe d'Auvergne committed suicide September 16 or 18, 1816, in the Holmes Hotel, a small hotel located at Great Smith Street in Westminster.

In 1817, Rohan was sued by other claimants to the La Tour d'Auvergne estate, including the duc de Bourbon, the duc de La Tremoille, the princesse de Bourbon-Condé and the princesse de Poix. All were related to the 7th duke of Bouillon on his maternal side. Seven years later, their claims were upheld by a court in Liège, and Rohan had to step down as duke.

In the 1820s, the La Tour name and inheritance were disputed between the families of La Tour d'Auvergne d'Apchier, which represented the last known surviving line of the La Tour d'Auvergne before its eventual extinction in 1896, and "La Tour d'Auvergne-Lauraguais", a French noble family whose kinship to the Dukes of Bouillon is unestablished. In 1859 Henri de La Tour d'Auvergne-Lauraguais, Marquis de Saint-Paulet (1823–1871) was awarded with the hereditary papal title of Prince by Pope Pius IX. From the latter family, Prince Henri de La Tour d'Auvergne-Lauraguais (1876–1914) married in 1904 Elisabeth Berthier de Wagram (1885–1960), daughter of the third Prince de Wagram and a descendant, in female line, of the Rothschild dynasty.

== Partial family tree ==
Family tree

Robert IV (d. 1194); Count of Auvergne	Bertrand I (d. 1208); Lord of La Tour
Robert de Clermont	Guy II (d. 1222); Count of Auvergne	Bernard I (d. 1253); Lord of La Tour
Thiebault d'Auvergne supposed ancestor of the Dauvergnes of Jersey	William X (d. 1247); Count of Auvergne	Bernard II (d. 1270); Lord of La Tour
Robert V of Auvergne (d. 1277); Count of Auvergne	Bertrand II (d. 1296); Lord of La Tour
Robert VI (1250–1314); Count of Auvergne	Beatrix of Rodez	Bernard III (d. 1325); Lord of La Tour	Bertrand de La Tour; Lord of Oliergues
Robert VII (died 1325); Count of Auvergne	Bertrand III (d. 1361); Lord of La Tour	Bernard de la Tour (d. 1361); Cardinal	Agne I de La Tour (d. 1354); Lord of Oliergues
Godefroy d'Auvergne; Lord of Montgascon	Guy (d. 1375); Lord of La Tour	Jean de la Tour (d. 1374); Cardinal	Bertrand de La Tour (1327-1382); Bishop of Toul and Puy	Bernard de La Tour (d. 1395); Bishop of Langres	Henri de La Tour (d. 1415); Bishop of Clermont
Marie I (1376–1437); Countess of Auvergne	Bertrand IV of La Tour (d. 1423)	Agne II de La Tour (d. 1404); Lord of Oliergues
Bertrand V of La Tour (d. 1461); Count of Auvergne	Jeanne de La Tour d'Auvergne m. Béraud III, Dauphin of Auvergne	Agne III de La Tour (d. 1415); Lord of Oliergues	Guillaume de La Tour (d. 1470); Bishop of Rodez; Patriarch of Antioch	Bertrand II de La Tour (d. 1450); Lord of Oliergues
Bertrand VI of La Tour (1417–1497); Count of Auvergne	Louise de La Trémoille (1432–1474)	Godefroi de La Tour d'Auvergne (d. 1469); Lord of Montgascon	Gabrielle de La Tour d'Auvergne (d. 1486) m. Louis I, Count of Montpensier	Isabelle de La Tour d'Auvergne (d. 1488) m. Guillaume de Châtillon-Blois	Agne IV de La Tour (d. 1489); Viscount of Turenne
Anne de La Tour d'Auvergne (d. 1512) m. Alexander Stewart, Duke of Albany	Jean I de La Tour d'Auvergne (1467–1501); Count of Auvergne	Jeanne de Bourbon-Vendôme (1465–1512)	Godefroi de La Tour d'Auvergne (d. 1497); Baron of Montgascon	Gilles de La Tour; Abbot of Vigeois	Antoine de La Tour (d. 1527); Viscount of Turenne	Antoine Raymond de La Tour (1471–aft. 1524); Baron of Murat
John Stewart, Duke of Albany (d. 1536); Regent of Scotland	Anne de La Tour d'Auvergne (1496–1524); Countess of Auvergne	Madeleine de La Tour d'Auvergne (1498–1519) m. Lorenzo de' Medici, Duke of Urbino	Anne de La Tour d'Auvergne (d. 1530); Lady of Montgascon	François de La Tour (d. 1532); Viscount of Turenne	Gilles de La Tour; Lord of Limeuil
Catherine de' Medici (1519–1589) heiress of Auvergne	Claudine de La Tour d'Auvergne (1520–1591)	François de La Tour d'Auvergne (1526–1557); Viscount of Turenne	Eleonore de Montmorency	Renée de La Tour d'Auvergne (d. 1548); Abbess of Paraclet	Léonarde de La Tour d'Auvergne (d. 1560); Abbess of Paraclet	Isabelle de La Tour (d. 1609) m. Scipion Sardini	Antoinette de La Tour (d. 1608) m. Charles Robert de La Marck	Antoine de La Tour; Lord of Murat	Jean de La Tour (d. aft. 1593); Lord of Alagnac
Charlotte de La Marck (1574–1594); Duchess of Bouillon	Henri de La Tour d'Auvergne (1555–1623); Duke of Bouillon	Elisabeth of Nassau (1577–1642)	Madeleine de La Tour d'Auvergne (1556–aft. 1580) m. Honorat I of Savoy	Martin de La Tour (d. aft. 1629); Baron of Murat
Marie de La Tour d'Auvergne (1600–1665) m. Henri de La Trémoille	Frédéric Maurice de La Tour d'Auvergne (1605–1652); Duke of Bouillon	Éléonore de Bergh (1613–1657)	Elisabeth de La Tour d'Auvergne (1606–1685) m. Guy Aldonce de Durfort de Duras	Henri de La Tour d'Auvergne, Viscount of Turenne (1611–1675); Marshal of France	Charlotte Nompar de Caumont (1623–1666)	Henri Corret illegitimate half-brother of Marshal Turenne	Jacques de La Tour (d. aft. 1667); Baron of Murat
Élisabeth de La Tour d'Auvergne (1635–1680) m. Charles III, Duke of Elbeuf	Godefroy Maurice de La Tour d'Auvergne (1636–1721); Duke of Bouillon	Marie Anne Mancini (1649–1714)	Frédéric-Maurice II de La Tour d'Auvergne (1642–1707); Count of Auvergne	Frances of Hohenzollern-Hechingen (1642–1698); Margravine of Bergen-op-Zoom	Emmanuel-Théodose de La Tour d'Auvergne (1643–1715); Cardinal	Mauricette-Fébronie de La Tour d'Auvergne (1652–1706) m. Maximilian Philipp Hieronymus, Duke of Bavaria-Leuchtenberg	Mathurin Corret (1645–1705); Lord of Kebauffret	Jean de La Tour; Baron of Murat
James Louis Sobieski (1667–1737)	Anne Geneviève de Lévis (1673–1727)	Louis-Charles de La Tour d'Auvergne (1665–1692); Prince of Turenne	Marie Armande de La Trémoille (1677–1717)	Emmanuel Théodose de La Tour d'Auvergne (1668–1730); Duke of Bouillon	Louise Henriette Françoise de Lorraine (1707–1737)	Louis Henri de La Tour d'Auvergne (1679–1753); Count of Évreux	Marie Anne Crozat (1696–1729)	Louise Julie de La Tour d'Auvergne (1679–1750) m. François-Armand de Rohan-Guéméné	Élisabeth-Éléonore de La Tour d'Auvergne (1665–1746); Abbess of Torigny	Louise-Émilie de La Tour d'Auvergne (1667–1737); Abbess of Montmartre	Henri-Oswald de La Tour d'Auvergne (1671–1747); Archbishop of Tours and Vienne; Cardinal	François-Egon de La Tour d'Auvergne (1675–1710); Margrave of Bergen-op-Zoom	Marie Anne d'Arenberg (1689–1736)	Jean-Maurice (1675–1739); Count of La Tour d'Apchier
Louise Françoise Angélique Le Tellier (1698–1719)	Anne Marie Christine de Simiane (1683–1722)
Charles Dauvergne m. Elizabeth Corbet	Maria Clementina Sobieska (1702–1725) m. James Francis Edward Stuart	Armande de La Tour d'Auvergne (1697–1717) m. Louis de Melun, Duke of Joyeuse	Frédéric Maurice Casimir de La Tour d'Auvergne (1702–1723); Prince of Turenne	Maria Karolina Sobieska (1697–1740)	Charles Godefroy de La Tour d'Auvergne (1706–1771); Duke of Bouillon	Marie Hortense Victoire de La Tour d'Auvergne (1704–1741) m. Charles Armand René de La Trémoille	Anne Marie Louise de La Tour d'Auvergne (1722–1739) m. Charles de Rohan, Prince of Soubise	Marie Charlotte de La Tour d'Auvergne (1729–1763) m. Charles Juste de Beauvau, Prince of Craon	Maria Henriette de La Tour d'Auvergne (1708–1728) m. John Christian, Count Palatine of Sulzbach	Olivier Louis Corret (1699–1749)
Charles Dauvergne (b. 1724)	Clementina Walkinshaw (1720–1802)	Charles Edward Stuart (1720–1788); Count of Albany	Marie Louise de La Tour d'Auvergne (1725–1793)	Jules Hercule Mériadec de Rohan (1726–1800); Prince of Guéméné	Louise of Lorraine (1718–1788)	Godefroy de La Tour d'Auvergne (1728–1792); Duke of Bouillon	Jean Bretagne Charles de La Trémoille (1737–1792); Duke of La Trémoille	Charlotte de Rohan (1737–1760) m. Louis Joseph, Prince of Condé	Anne Louise Marie de Beauvau (1750–1834) m. Philippe Louis, Prince-Duke of Poix	Louis Claude Maurice de La Tour d'Auvergne (1719–1747); Colonel of the Régiment de La Tour d'Auvergne	Nicolas François Julie de La Tour d'Auvergne (1720–1790); Colonel of the Régiments de La Tour d'Auvergne and de Boulonnais
Charlotte Stuart, Duchess of Albany (1753–1789); ~ Ferdinand Maximilien Mériadec de Rohan	Charles Godefroi de Rohan (1748–1749)	Henri Louis Marie de Rohan (1745–1809); Prince of Guéméné	Hedwig of Hesse-Rotenburg (1748–1801)	Jacques Léopold de La Tour d'Auvergne (1746–1802); Duke of Bouillon	Charles Bretagne Marie de La Trémoille (1764–1839); Duke of La Trémoille	Louis Henri Joseph (1756–1830); Prince of Condé	Louise Adélaïde (1757–1824); Princess of Condé	Théophile Corret de La Tour d'Auvergne (1743–1800); First Grenadier of France
Philippe d'Auvergne (1754–1816); Vice-Admiral RN; Duke of Bouillon	Corbet James d'Auvergne (1765–1825); Captain RN; Lieutenant-Governor of Heligoland	Victoire Adelaide de Rohan (b. 1779)	Charles Alain de Rohan (1764–1836); Duke of Bouillon	Marie Louise Josephine de Rohan (1765–1839) m. Charles Louis Gaspard de Rohan-Rochefort	Godefroy Maurice Marie Joseph de La Tour d'Auvergne (1770–1849); Colonel of the Régiment de La Tour d'Auvergne
Berthe de Rohan (1782–1841); Duchess of Bouillon	Louis Victor Mériadec de Rohan (1766–1846); Duke of Bouillon	Camille de Rohan (1800–1892); Duke of Bouillon	Benjamin de Rohan (1804–1846)	Aurélie-Marie-Joséphine-Héloïse de Bossi (1809–1889)	Maurice César de La Tour d'Auvergne (1809–1896) "Duke of Bouillon"
Arthur de Rohan (1826–1885)
Alain de Rohan (1853–1914); Duke of Bouillon
Alain de Rohan (1893–1976); Duke of Bouillon	Karl Anton Rohan (1898–1975)
Karl Rohan (1934–2008); Duke of Bouillon	Albert Rohan (1936–2019); Duke of Bouillon

== See also ==
- Duchess of Bouillon
- Duke of Bouillon
