= Godfrey of Auvergne, Lord of Montgascon =

Godfrey of Auvergne
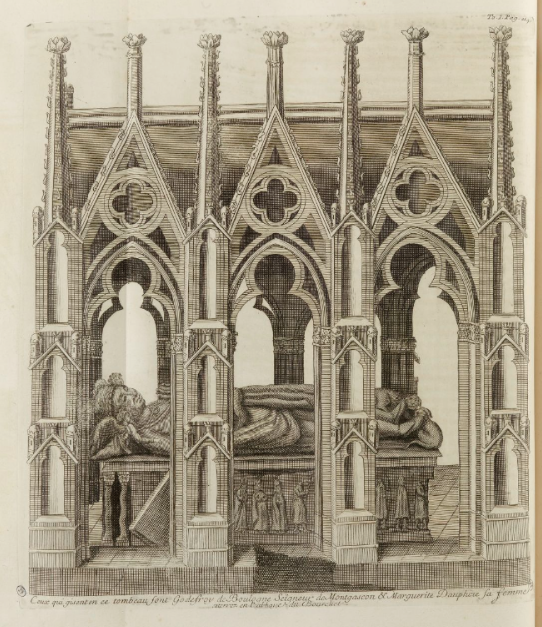
- Illustration of the tomb of Godfrey and Marguerite of Clermont in the abbey of Bouschet-Vauluisant, Yronde-et-Buron.

Lord of Montgascon
- Reign: 1361- c. 1387
- Died: c. 1387
- Spouse: Marguerite of Clermont; Jeanne of Ventadour; Blanche of Senlis
- Issue: Marie; Antoine
- House: House of Auvergne
- Father: Robert VII of Auvergne
- Mother: Marie of Dampierre

Godfrey of Auvergne (died after 1387) was lord of Montgascon from 1325 until his death.

== Life ==
In 1361, after the death of his nephew Philip I, Duke of Burgundy, he inherited from the lordship of Montgascon, Joze, Ennezat, Roche-Savine, Gerzat, Bulhon, Saint Bonnet, Novacelles, Yffandolanges and Bouton-nargues.

In 1364 he married Marguerite of Clermont, daughter of John, Dauphin of Auvergne. However, she died in 1374.

In 1375 he married Jeanne of Ventadour, daughter of Bernard, count of Ventadour. She died not long after giving birth to Marie I, Countess of Auvergne.

In 1377 he married Blanche 'le Bouteiller' of Senlis, daughter of Guy III of Senlis, lord of Ermenonville.

== Issue ==
With Jeanne of Ventadour he had one child:

- Marie (1376-1437), countess of Auvergne and Boulogne, she married Bertrand IV de La Tour;

With Blanche of Senlis he had one child:

- Antonie (died 1396), who married Jeanne Flotte in 1384, daughter of Antoine Flotte, he supposedly died at the Battle of Nicopolis.
