= Robert VII of Auvergne =

French nobleman

Robert VII
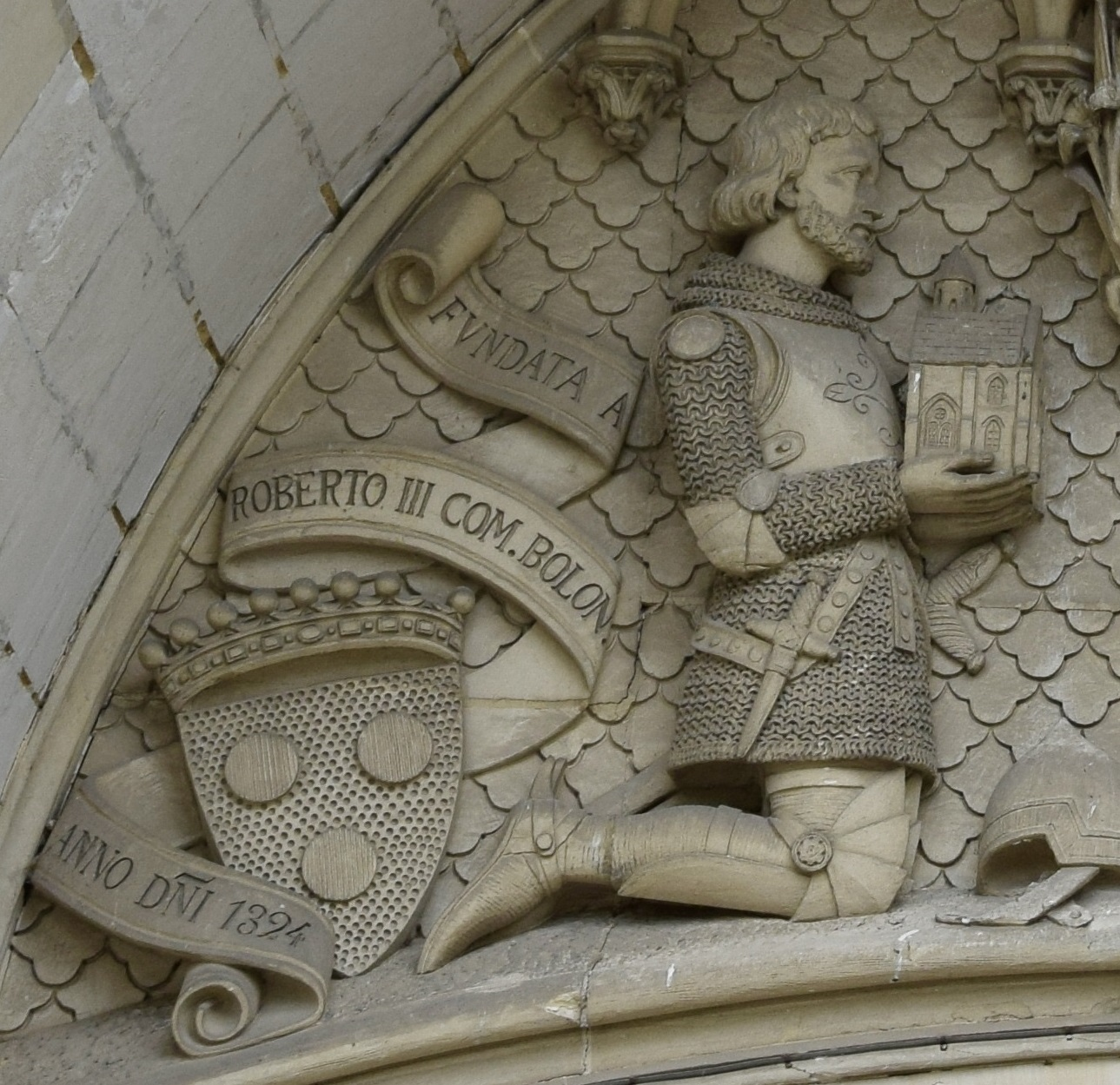
- A statue of Robert in portal of the Chartreuse Notre-Dame des Prés which he founded

Count of Auvergne and Boulogne
- Reign: 1317–1325
- Predecessor: Robert VI of Auvergne
- Successor: William XII of Auvergne
- Born: c. 1282
- Died: 13 October 1325
- Buried: Church of Bouschet-Vauluisant, Yronde-et-Buron
- Noble family: House of Auvergne
- Spouses: Blanche of Clermont; Marie of Dampierre
- Issue: William; John; Guy; Godfrey; Mahaut
- Father: Robert VI of Auvergne
- Mother: Beatrice of Montgascon

Robert VII of Auvergne (c. 1282 – 13 October 1325) was count of Auvergne and Boulogne from 1317 until his death.

== Life ==
In 1297, Robert fought alongside the King of France, Philip IV, and his father, Robert VI of Auvergne in the Franco-Flemish War. He participated in the battle inside of the walls of Courtrai on the 11th of July 1302. According to Étienne Baluze, Robert fled the battle together with other nobles, but other chroniclers disagree. Robert also took part in the following Battle of Mons-en-Pévèle, in 1304.

In 1314, his father designated his wife, Beatrice of Montgascon, as his only heir. She later designated Robert as her heir in her own testament.

His father probably died in 1317, the year after which he does not appear in any document. So Robert succeeded his father as count of Auvergne and Boulogne.

Robert died on the 13th of October 1325. He was succeeded by his son William.

== Family and issue ==
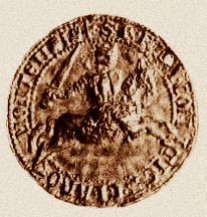
Seal of Robert VII

In Paris, the 23rd of June 1303, Robert married Blanche of Clermont († 1304), daughter of Robert, Count of Clermont and Beatrice of Burgundy, Lady of Bourbon. They had only one son:

- William (c. 1304-1332), count of Boulogne and Auvergne.

After Blanche's death in 1304, Robert married Marie of Dampierre, daughter of William I of Termonde and Alice of Clermont-Nestle. They had four children together:

- John († 1386), count of Montfort, Boulogne and Auvergne;
- Guy († 1373), that became Archbishop of Lyon, cardinal and Dean of the College of Cardinals;
- Godfrey († c. 1387), lord of Montgascon and father of Marie I, Countess of Auvergne;
- Mahaut, married in 1334 with Amadeus III of Geneva.

French nobility
Preceded by Robert II and VI	Count of Auvergne and Boulogne; 1317–1325	Succeeded by William III and XII
