= Bertrand VI of La Tour =

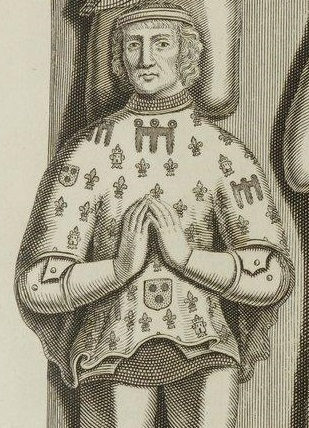
- Detail of the tomb of Bertrand VI in the abbey of Bouchet, Yronde-et-Buron

Lord of La Tour
- Reign: 1461-1497
- Predecessor: Bertrand V
- Successor: John IV

Count of Auvergne
- Reign: 1461-1497
- Predecessor: Bertrand V
- Successor: John IV

Count of Lauragais
- Reign: 1477-1497
- Predecessor: Bertrand V
- Successor: John IV

Count of Boulogne
- Reign: 1461-1477
- Predecessor: Bertrand V
- Successor: Integrated into the royal domain
- Born: c. 1417
- Died: 26th of September 1497
- Spouse: Louise de La Trémoille
- Issue: John; Françoise; Jeanne; Anne; Louise
- House: House of La Tour d'Auvergne
- Father: Bertrand V of La Tour
- Mother: Jacquette du Peschin

Bertrand VI (c. 1417 - 26 September 1497) was lord of La Tour and count of Auvergne from 1461 until his death. He was also count of Boulogne from 1461 to 1477, when he exchanged that title for the county of Lauragais, which he held for the remainder of his life.

== Life ==
Bertrand was part of Charles VII of France's entourage from 1441 to 1451, during the last stages of the Hundred Years' War. He took part in the Siege of Tartas, in 1442, where he is cited as lord of Montgascon. He was proclaimed knight after the 1450 Battle of Formigny.

In 1461, his father, Bertrand V of La Tour, died. Bertrand succeeded him as his only heir.

In 1468, during the Burgundian Wars, he occupied savoyard Bresse, following Louis XI's orders.

In 1473, Bertrand built the franciscan church of Vic-le-Comte.

In 1477, Charles the Bold died. This allowed Louis XI to reconquer the county of Boulogne, which had been occupied by burgundian forces. Louis then handed it back to Bertrand. However, during the same year, Bertrand II dealt with Louis XI, exchanging the county of Boulogne with the county of Lauragais. Boulogne, so became part of the royal domain.

Bertrand died in 1497 and was succeeded by his first-born son: John IV, Count of Auvergne.

== Family and issue ==
In 1445, Bertrand married Louise de La Trémoille, daughter of Georges de La Trémoille and Catherine de L'Isle-Bouchard. They had five children:

- John (1461–1501), count of Auvergne and Boulogne;
- Françoise (d. c. 1484), married in 1469 to Gilbert of Chabannes, lord of Curton;
- Jeanne (d. after 1472), married in 1472 to Aymar de Poitiers, lord of Saint-Vallier;
- Anne (d. 1512), married in 1480 to Alexander Stewart, Duke of Albany;
- Louise (d. after 1486), married in 1486 to Claude de Blaisy, viscount of Arnay.

French nobility
Preceded by Bertrand I	Count of Auvergne; 1461–1497	Succeeded by John IV
Preceded by Bertrand I	Count of Boulogne; 1461–1477	Succeeded by Integrated into the royal domain
Preceded by Bertrand V	Lord of La Tour; 1461–1497	Succeeded by John IV
Preceded by New title	Count of Lauragais; 1477–1497	Succeeded by John IV
