= Anne de la Tour d'Auvergne =

Anne de la Tour d'Auvergne may refer to:

- Anne de la Tour d'Auvergne (d. 1512), daughter of Bertrand VI of Auvergne, wife of the 1st Duke of Albany and then comte de La Chambre
- Anne, Countess of Auvergne (d. 1524), reigning Countess of Auvergne, daughter of John III of Auvergne, wife of the 2nd Duke of Albany
