= Alexander Stewart, Duke of Albany =

15th-century Scottish prince

Alexander

Duke of Albany
- Successor: John Stewart
- Born: c. 1454
- Died: 7 August 1485 (aged 31); Paris, France
- Burial: Couvent des Célestins, Paris, France
- Spouse: Lady Katherine Sinclair; Anne de la Tour d'Auvergne
- Issue: Alexander, Bishop of Moray; Andrew Stewart; John, Duke of Albany; Maud Stewart; Margaret Stewart (illegitimate)
- House: Stewart
- Father: James II of Scotland
- Mother: Mary of Guelders

Alexander Stewart, Duke of Albany (c. 1454 – 7 August 1485), was a Scottish prince and the second surviving son of King James II of Scotland. He fell out with his older brother, King James III, and fled to France, where he unsuccessfully sought help. In 1482 he invaded Scotland with the army of King Edward IV of England and assumed control of the country. Scottish lords turned against him in 1483 and he fled after King Edward died. The second invasion, in 1484, was not supported by the new English king, King Richard III, and failed. He died in a duel with Louis, Duke of Orléans (future king Louis XII of France), by a splinter from Louis's lance.

== Rise ==
Alexander was the second surviving son of King James II of Scotland and his wife, Mary of Guelders. Created Duke of Albany before 1458, Alexander also received the earldom of March, and lordships of Annandale and the Isle of Man. In 1460 he travelled to the continent, and to Guelders, the land of his maternal family. On his return in 1464 he was captured by the English. He was soon released, and as he matured began to take part in the government and defence of Scotland, being appointed in quick succession Lord High Admiral of Scotland and Warden of the Marches. Some of his actions on the marches aroused suspicion, suggesting sharp practice and a policy of border violence and truce breaking against England that contravened the 1474 marriage alliance of his brother King James III.

== Struggle with his brother ==
In 1479, the seat of Albany's earldom of March was seized, although accounts of his imprisonment in Edinburgh Castle at this time appear to be misdated. Albany fled by sea to Paris where in September 1479 he was welcomed by King Louis XI, and received royal favour by his marriage to Anne de la Tour. Louis, however, would not assist him to attack his brother the king, and crossing to England he made a treaty with King Edward IV at Fotheringhay in June 1482.

By the Treaty of Fotheringhay, Albany promised to hold Scotland under English suzerainty in return for Edward's assistance and to deliver the southern shires into English possession. With the Duke of Gloucester, afterwards King Richard III of England, he marched at the head of one of the largest English armies to be assembled after the Wars of Independence – 20,000 men – to Berwick, which was seized (the last time it would change hands between England and Scotland). Albany ordered the demolition of Blackadder Castle, and the army moved towards Edinburgh. Meanwhile James III was seized at Lauder Bridge as he marched to face the invasion, and was imprisoned in Edinburgh Castle. It has been suggested that there was a conspiracy between Albany and a group of magnates who had been excluded from power in the 1470s, including the king's Stewart half-uncles, the earls of Atholl, Buchan and the bishop-elect of Moray, although evidence is limited. Gloucester, meanwhile, seems to have been satisfied with the seizure of Berwick, and quit Edinburgh on 11 August. At that point the "Lauder Lords" in Edinburgh Castle emerged and began working with Albany to form a new government. By early October Albany was acting lieutenant-general of the realm, had taken the earldom of Mar, and had re-acquired his former lands and offices.

Albany's adoption of the earldom of Mar seems to have angered George Gordon, 2nd Earl of Huntly, one of the most powerful magnates in the country, who had designs on the earldom himself and came to the parliament of December 1482, at which Albany had hoped to have his lieutenant-generalship confirmed. The king meanwhile managed to persuade a number of the "Lauder Lords" to return to loyalty to him, most notably John Stewart, Lord Darnley, keeper of Edinburgh Castle, Atholl and the bishop of Dunkeld. Subsequently the parliament passed a number of mutually contradictory acts, and Albany fled to Dunbar between Christmas and the new year. On 2 January 1483 Albany made an abortive second attempt to seize the king. Edward IV promised the duke further aid on 11 February, and on 19 March he managed to force the king into a humiliating indenture. With the death of Edward IV on 9 April 1483 Albany lost his main source of power and shortly thereafter he fled south, letting an English garrison into Dunbar Castle as he went.

== Last years and death ==
In July 1484, Albany once again invaded Scotland, this time with a small force with the long-exiled James Douglas, 9th Earl of Douglas. The Battle of Lochmaben ensued, where the invasion was defeated, Douglas was captured, while Albany fled south again. The invasion had no support from Richard III, and failed to find any Scottish support in the former estates of Albany and Douglas. The author of Albany's most recent biography claims that there may have been a further attempt to return to Scotland in 1485. The persistent story of Albany's escape from Edinburgh castle, usually misdated to 1479 or 1482/3 by chroniclers, instead is claimed to have occurred in 1485. Certainly Albany's closest ally and fellow exile James Liddale of Halkerston is found imprisoned awaiting execution at this time, suggesting he had returned to Scotland with Albany, and a chronicle account that claims Albany killed the "laird of Manerston" (a minor but trusted royal official) may be confirmed by Manerston's death before 14 October 1485. Albany fled for the last time, again to France, where he was killed shortly afterwards in a duel with the duke of Orléans in Paris, by a splinter from the latter's lance. He was buried near the high altar in the Couvent des Célestins. The titles of March and Dunbar were forfeited and annexed to the crown of Scotland.

== Family and children ==
Albany's first wife was Lady Katherine, daughter of William Sinclair, 3rd Earl of Orkney, who bore him three sons and a daughter. This marriage was dissolved in 1478, and its issue was regarded as illegitimate. Their children included:

- Alexander Stewart (before 1477 – 9 December 1537), who became bishop of Moray. He left illegitimate issue.
- Andrew Stewart.

In 1480, Albany married Anne de la Tour d'Auvergne, daughter of Bertrand VI of La Tour, Count of Auvergne and of Boulogne and his wife Louise (daughter of Georges de la Trémoille). They had a son, John (1482–1536), who succeeded as Duke of Albany, and married Anne's niece, also Anne de La Tour d'Auvergne.

Military offices
Preceded by David Lindsay	Lord High Admiral of Scotland; 1482–1485	Succeeded by Patrick Hepburn
Peerage of Scotland
New creation	Duke of Albany; 2nd creation bef. 1458–1485	Succeeded by John Stewart
New creation	Earl of March; 2nd creation 1455–1485	Succeeded by John Stewart
