= County of Boulogne =

French county (896–1501)

County of Boulogne Comté de Boulogne (French)
- 896–1477
- Coat of arms

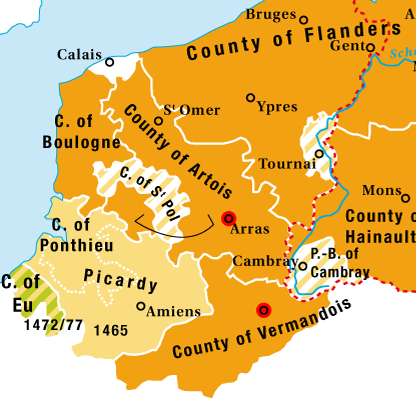
- County of Boulogne (upper left on map) in 1465–1477
- Status: Fief of the Kingdom of France
- Capital: Boulogne
- Historical era: Middle Ages
  - acquisition by the House of Flanders: 896
  - incorporation into the crown lands of France: 1477
Succeeded by
Kingdom of France; Pale of Calais

The County of Boulogne was a county within the Kingdom of France during the 9th to 15th centuries, centred on the city of Boulogne-sur-Mer. It was ruled by the counts of Flanders in the 10th century, but a separate House of Boulogne emerged during the 11th century. It was merged into the County of Artois by Philip II of France in 1212 and eventually annexed to the royal domain itself in 1477.

== History ==
Boulogne was already a pagus within the Kingdom of the Franks (pagus Bononiensis), but there are few records prior to the 11th century. A proverbially wicked count named Herrequin is recorded for the 9th century, but he may be legendary (see Herla, Erlking). It seems to have come under the rule of the counts of Flanders in the late 9th or early 10th century. In 886, bishop Gauzlin of Paris asked count Erkenger of Boulogne to solicit German help against the Viking raids. Erkenger lost all his possessions in 896, as he remained loyal to Charles the Simple. It may have been at this point that Baldwin II, Count of Flanders, gained control over Boulogne.

Eustace II of Boulogne accompanied William the Conqueror's invasion in 1066. Boulogne was also a major participant in the First Crusade; Eustace III of Boulogne's brothers, Godfrey of Bouillon and Baldwin of Bouillon, both became kings of Jerusalem, and Eustace himself was offered but declined the title.

Count Renaud of Boulogne joined the imperial side at the Battle of Bouvines in 1214, and he was defeated by Philip II of France.

Boulogne passed under nominal royal control in 1223 when Philip II's son Philip Hurepel became count jure uxoris upon his marriage to Matilda II. Hurepel revolted against Blanche of Castile when Louis VIII of France died in 1226. When Philip Hurepel died in 1235, Matilda continued to reign and in 1238 was married to Alphonse, second son of King Alfonso II of Portugal, and younger brother of King Sancho II of Portugal. Having become Afonso III of Portugal in 1248 and renounced his title of Count of Boulogne, Alfonse divorced her in 1253 due to her barrenness in favour of Beatrice of Castile.

Nevertheless, Matilda and Philip did have a son Alberic, and a daughter Joan who both survived. Alberic reportedly renounced his rights and went to England, for unknown reasons. Apparently he survived his mother and died in 1284, but presumably did not leave issue. Joan was married in 1236 to Gaucher de Châtillon, Count of Mortain (d. 1251). She predeceased her mother in 1252, and presumably left no surviving issue.

Consequently, after Matilda, her county of Boulogne then passed to Matilda's niece, Adelaide of Brabant and her husband William X of Auvergne.

In 1347, as part of the Hundred Years' War, Calicas was annexed as a territory within the Kingdom of England.

Bertrand V de la Tour succeeded to the counties of Auvergne and of Boulogne in 1437. Through his son Bertrand VI de la Tour the County of Boulogne passed to his grandson, the last medieval count of Boulogne: Jean III de la Tour d'Auvergne. By his marriage to Jeanne of Bourbon-Vendôme, he left two daughters:

- The eldest daughter, Anne of la Tour d'Auvergne, married John Stewart, Duke of Albany, however she died childless in 1524.
- The youngest, Madeleine de La Tour d'Auvergne married Lorenzo II de' Medici and gave birth to Catherine de' Medici, who inherited both Auvergne and Boulogne due to the death of the childless Anne.

The representatives of the County joined in the Netherlands the Estates General of 1464 in Bruges. At the death of Charles the Bold the King of France claimed the end of the dependency of Boulogne from the County of Artois, causing new struggles against the Habsburgs. The Treaty of Senlis closed the problem: France lost Artois to the Empire, while the Habsburgs renounced to Boulogne.

In 1477, Bertrand II dealt with Louis XI, exchanging the county of Boulogne with the county of Lauragais. Boulogne, so became part of the royal domain.

== See also ==
- County of Artois
- County of Flanders
