= Chartreuse Notre-Dame des Prés =

Carthusian monastery in Pas-de-Calais, France

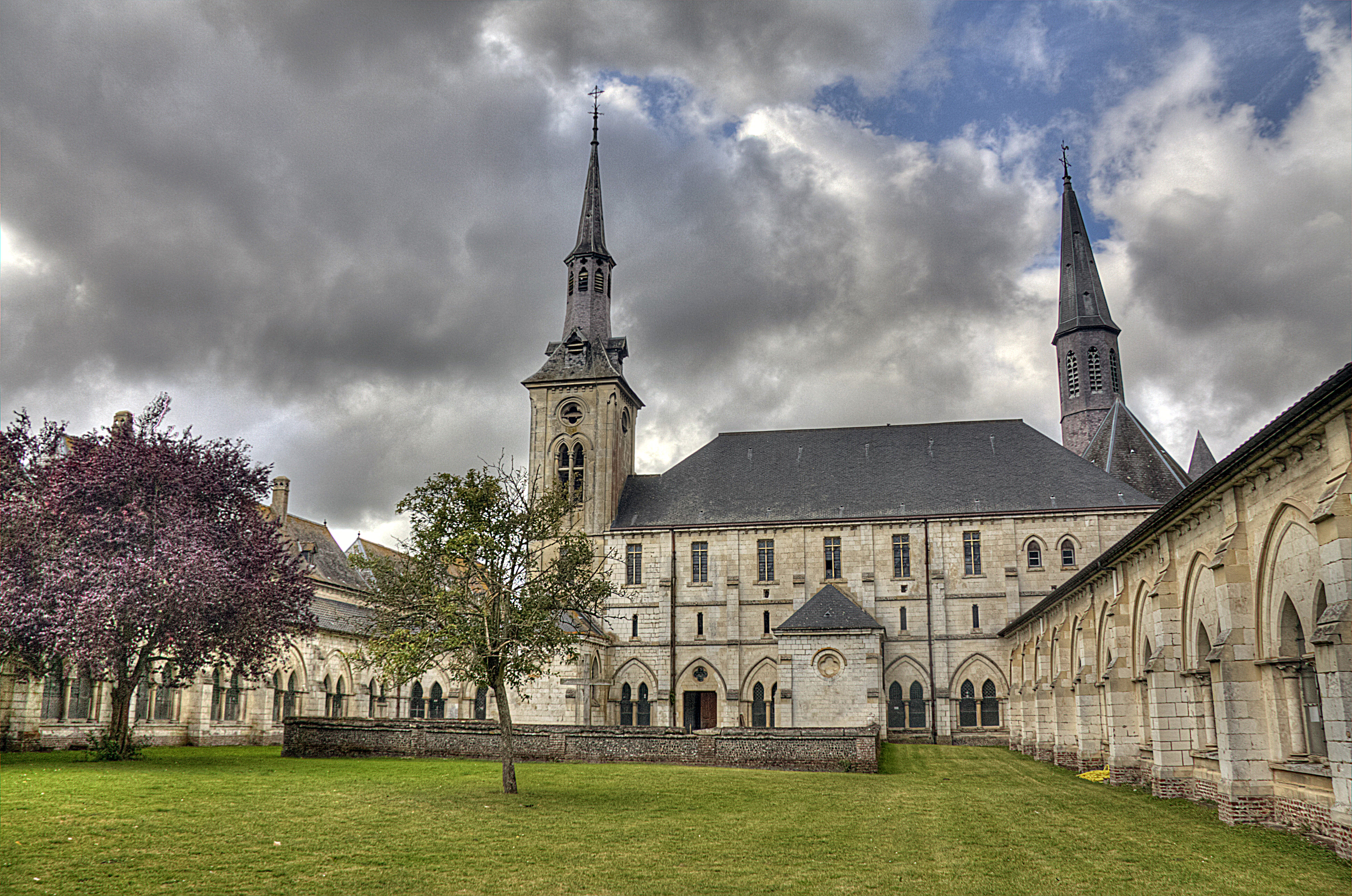

Religion
- Affiliation: Roman Catholic
- Region: Pas-de-Calais

Location
- Municipality: Neuville-sous-Montreuil
- Country: France
- Interactive map of Chartreuse Notre-Dame des Prés
- Coordinates: 50°28′15″N 1°47′26″E

Architecture
- Style: Romanesque and Gothic
- Groundbreaking: 14th century
- Completed: 1338

The Chartreuse Notre-Dame des Prés was a Carthusian monastery in northern France, at Neuville-sous-Montreuil, in the Diocese of Arras, now Pas-de-Calais. The charter of foundation is dated on 15 July 1324, and the church was consecrated in 1338. The Chartreuse Notre-Dame des Prés de Neuville has been designated as a Monument historique since 1993.

== Early history ==
The Notre-Dame-des-Prés charterhouse was founded in 1325, either by Robert III, Count of Boulogne, or by Robert VI. The foundation, being close to the city of Calais, was liable to disturbance in time of war. Between 1346 and 1354, the monastery was sacked by the English during the Battle of Crécy.

In 1542 the monastery was again wrecked, first from 1539 to 1571 by the Imperial Army, and by Protestant Huguenots in 1584. The monastery was rebuilt by Bernard Bruyant in the latter part of the seventeenth century and remained undisturbed until the early 18th century. In 1790 following the outbreak of the French Revolution, the monastery was suppressed, the monks were expelled, and the property was sold by auction the following year.

== Nineteenth century ==
Eighty-two years after the end of the revolution, the Carthusians repurchased a portion of their old estate and the first stone of the new monastery was laid on 2 April 1872. The work was then pushed forward by the prior, Eusèbe Bergier, and finished in three years. Montreuil took a special position among Carthusian houses, owing to the establishment there of a printing press from which has been issued a number of works connected with the order. Carolo Le Couteulx's "Annales", and the edition of Denys the Carthusian may be quoted as examples. By the "Association Laws" the community of Montreuil were once more ejected. The monks lodged in the Charterhouse of Parkminster, England; the printing works was transferred to Tournai, in Belgium.

During the World War I, approximately 5,000 Belgian civilians fleeing their country took refuge at the monastery, where they stayed from March 1915 to April 1919. At that time, typhus and the Spanish flu were rampant, and the Carthusian monastery was converted into a Belgian civilian hospital with nearly 700 beds. The site also served as a hospital during World War II and later as a Hospice until 1998.

== Site restoration ==
In 2016, after being abandoned for nearly 20 years, the Carthusian monastery association launched a restoration project for all the buildings at a total cost of €42 million, at the time the second most expensive restoration project in France after Notre-Dame de Paris.
