= Neuville-sous-Montreuil =

- Commune
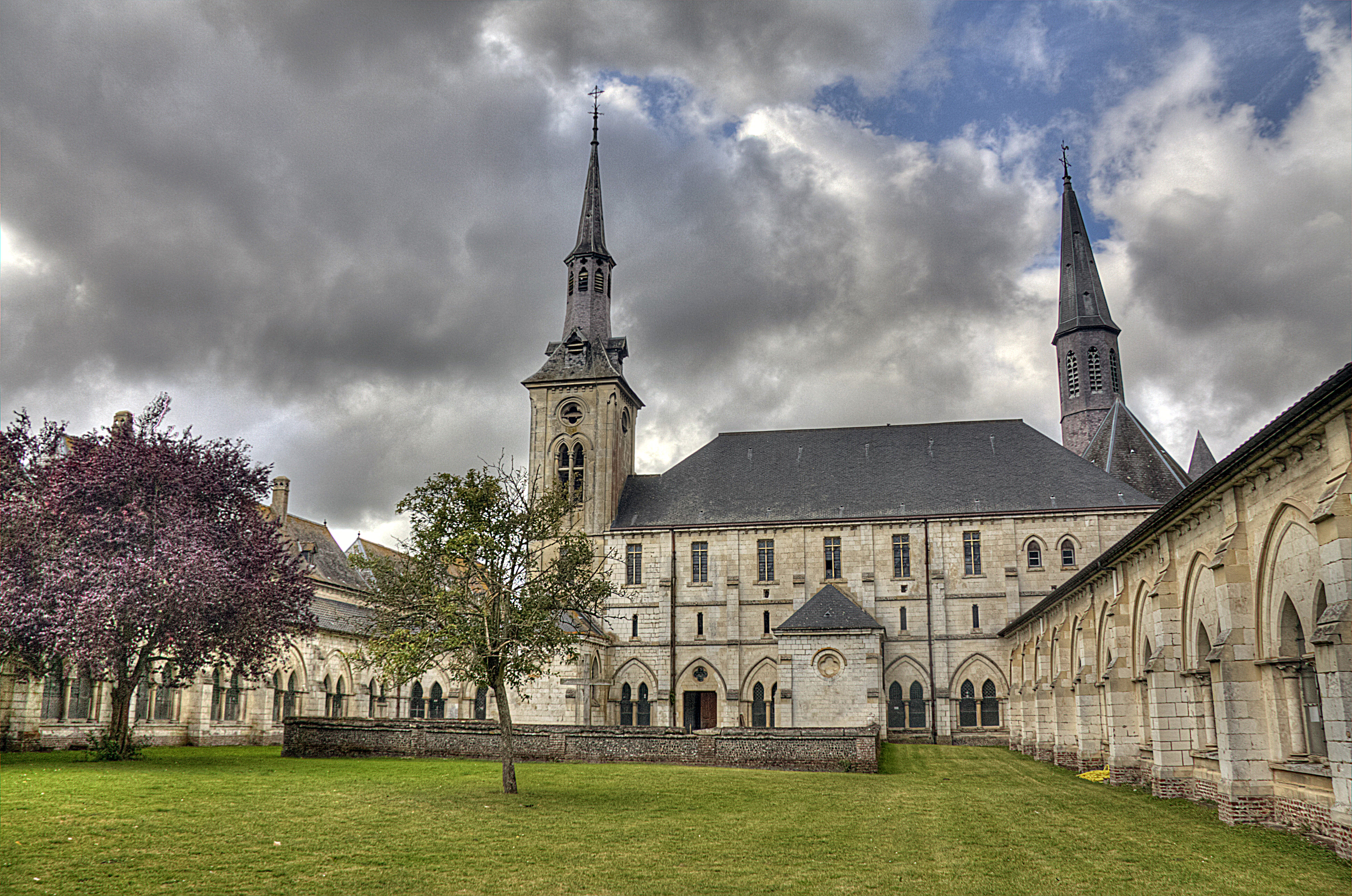
- The Chartreuse Notre-Dame des Prés

- Coat of arms
- Location of Neuville-sous-Montreuil
- Location within France Location within Hauts-de-France
- Coordinates: 50°28′32″N 1°46′36″E
- Country: France
- Region: Hauts-de-France
- Department: Pas-de-Calais
- Arrondissement: Montreuil
- Canton: Berck
- Intercommunality: CA Deux Baies en Montreuillois

Government
  - Mayor (2023–2026): Olivier Deken
- Area^{1}: 8.82 km^{2} (3.41 sq mi)
- Elevation: 94 m (308 ft)
- Highest elevation: 100 m (330 ft)
- Lowest elevation: 2 m (6.6 ft)
- Population (2023): 618
  - Density: 70.1/km^{2} (181/sq mi)
- Time zone: UTC+01:00 (CET)
  - Summer (DST): UTC+02:00 (CEST)
- INSEE/Postal code: 62610 /62170
- ^{1} French Land Register data, which excludes lakes, ponds, glaciers > 1 km^{2} (0.386 sq mi or 247 acres) and river estuaries.

Neuville-sous-Montreuil (French pronunciation: [nøvil su mɔ̃tʁœj], literally Neuville under Montreuil) is a commune in the Pas-de-Calais department in the Hauts-de-France region of France, a suburb east of Montreuil-sur-Mer.

== Population ==
Historical population
Year	Pop.	±% p.a.
1968	1,096	—
1975	1,290	+2.36%
1982	1,123	−1.96%
1990	984	−1.64%
1999	739	−3.13%
2007	673	−1.16%
2012	660	−0.39%
2017	650	−0.30%
2023	618	−0.84%
Source: INSEE

== Places of interest ==
- The thirteenth century charterhouse of Notre-Dame-des-Prés. It was rebuilt in the 19th century.

== See also ==
- Communes of the Pas-de-Calais department
