= Bertrand IV of La Tour =

Lord of La Tour
- Reign: 1375-1423
- Predecessor: Guy of La Tour
- Successor: Bertrand V of La Tour
- Died: 1423
- Spouse: Marie I, Countess of Auvergne
- Issue: Bertrand, Jeanne; Isabelle; Louise
- House: La Tour
- Father: Guy of La Tour
- Mother: Mathe de Beaufort

Bertrand IV of La Tour (died c. 1423) was lord of La Tour.

== Life ==
He was the son of Guy of La Tour and Mathe de Beaufort.

He married Marie I, Countess of Auvergne.

== Issue ==
He and Marie had 4 children:

- Bertrand (died March 1461), Lord of La La Tour, Count of Auvergne and Boulogne;
- Jeanne, who married Béraud III, Dauphin of Auvergne;
- Isabelle, who married Louis Armand Chalancon, Viscount of Polignac;
- Louise, who married Claude of Montagu, lord of Couches .

French nobility
Preceded by Guy	Lord of La Tour; 1375-1423	Succeeded by Bertrand V
