= List of consorts of Bourbon =

== Lady of Bourbon ==
=== House of Bourbon, 950–1218 ===
Picture	Name	Father	Birth	Marriage	Became Consort	Ceased to be Consort	Death	Spouse
	Ermengarde	-	-	-	around 950 husband's accession	before Jan 954 husband's death	-	Adhémar
	Aldesinde	-	-	-	around 953 husband's accession	after January 954 husband's death	-	Aymon I
	Rotgardis	-	-	before 10 July 961		before 11 July 971/10 July 972		Archambaud I
	Ermengarde	-	-	before 1000		21 May 1031/33 husband's death	22 January after 1034	Archambaud II
	Beletrud	-	-	-	21 May 1031/33 husband's accession	-		Archambaud III
	Aurea	-	-	-		16 August 1078/33 husband's death	-	Archambaud III
The name of his wife is unknown but she remarried to Adélard Guillebaut, Sire de Château-Meillant after his death.								Archambaud V
	Adelinde de Nevers	William I, Count of Nevers (Nevers)	-	1099	around 1116 husband's accession	1120 husband's death	-	Aymon II
	Agnes of Savoy	Humbert II, Count of Savoy (Savoy)	1104	25 January 1140		1171 husband's death	1127 or after 1180	Archambaud VII

=== House of Dampierre, 1228–1288 ===
Picture	Name	Father	Birth	Marriage	Became Consort	Ceased to be Consort	Death	Spouse
	Béatrice de Montluçon	Archambaud, Sire de Montluçon	-	1215	18 June 1228 husband's accession	23 August 1242 husband's death	-	Archambaud VIII
	Yolande de Châtillon	Guy II, Count of Saint-Pol	1222	30 May 1228	23 August 1242 husband's accession	15 January 1249 husband's death	1254	Archambaud IX

=== House of Burgundy, 1288–1310 ===
None

=== Capetian House of Clermont, 1310–1327 ===
Picture	Name	Father	Birth	Marriage	Became Consort	Ceased to be Consort	Death	Spouse
	Mary of Avesnes	John II, Count of Holland (Avesnes)	1280	September 1310		27 December 1327; Became Duchess	September 1354	Louis I

== Duchess of Bourbon ==
=== First Creation ===
==== Capetian House of Bourbon, 1327–1523 ====
Picture	Name	Father	Birth	Marriage	Became Duchess	Ceased to be Duchess	Death	Spouse
	Mary of Avesnes	John II, Count of Holland (Avesnes)	1280	September 1310	27 December 1327 husband's accession	29 January 1342 husband's death	September 1354	Louis I
	Isabella of Valois	Charles, Count of Valois (Valois)	1313	25 January 1336	29 January 1342 husband's accession	19 September 1356 husband's death	26 July 1383	Peter I
	Anna of Auvergne, Countess of Forez	Beraud II, Dauphin of Auvergne	1358	January 1370		19 August 1410 husband's death	22 September 1417	Louis II
	Marie of Berry, Duchess of Auvergne	John of Valois, Duke of Berry (Valois)	1370	21 June 1401		5 January 1434 husband's death	June 1434	John I
	Agnes of Burgundy	John the Fearless (Valois-Burgundy)	1407	17 September 1425	5 January 1434 husband's accession	4 December 1456 husband's death	1 December 1476	Charles I
	Joan of France	Charles VII of France (Valois)	1435	3 November 1452	4 December 1456 husband's accession	4 May 1482		John II
	Catherine d'Armagnac	Jacques d'Armagnac, Duke of Nemours (Armagnac)	1466	28 August 1484		2 March 1487		John II
	Jeanne de Bourbon-Vendome	Jean VIII, Count of Vendôme (Bourbon-La Marche)	1465	12 April 1487		1 April 1488 husband's death	22 January 1511	John II
	Anne of France, Viscountess of Thouars	Louis XI of France (Valois)	3 April 1461	3 November 1473	15 April 1488 husband's accession	10 October 1503 husband's death	14 November 1522	Peter II

=== Second Creation ===
==== House of Savoy, 1523–1531 ====
None

=== Third Creation ===
==== House of Valois-Angoulême, 1544–1545 ====
None

=== Fourth Creation ===
==== House of Valois-Angoulême, 1566–1574 ====
None

=== Fifth Creation ===
==== House of Bourbon, 1661–1830 ====
Picture	Name	Father	Birth	Marriage	Became Duchess	Ceased to be Duchess	Death	Spouse
	Claire-Clémence de Maillé-Brézé, Duchess of Fronsac	Urbain de Maillé, Marquis of Brézé	25 February 1628	February, 1641	1661 husband's accession	5 November 1667 title passed to grandson	16 April 1694	Louis de Bourbon
	Louise Françoise de Bourbon, Légitimée de France	Louis XIV of France	1 June 1673	25 May 1685		1 April 1709 became Princess of Condé	16 June 1743	Louis de Bourbon
	Marie Anne de Bourbon	François Louis, Prince of Conti (Bourbon-Conti)	18 April 1689	9 August 1713		21 March 1720		Louis Henri de Bourbon
	Caroline of Hesse-Rotenburg	Ernest Leopold, Landgrave of Hesse-Rotenburg (Hesse-Rotenburg)	18 August 1714	24 July 1728		9 August 1736 title passed to son	14 June 1741	Louis Henri de Bourbon
	Charlotte Élisabeth Godefride de Rohan	Charles de Rohan, Prince of Soubise (Rohan)	7 October 1737	3 May 1753		13 April 1756 title passed to son	4 March 1760	Louis Joseph de Bourbon
	Bathilde d'Orléans	Louis Philippe I, Duke of Orléans (House of Orléans)	9 July 1750	24 April 1770		10 January 1822		Louis Henri de Bourbon
