= Jeanne of Bourbon, Duchess of Bourbon =

French noblewoman (1465–1511)

Jeanne de Bourbon
- Duchess of Bourbon; Countess of Auvergne; Baroness de la Garde
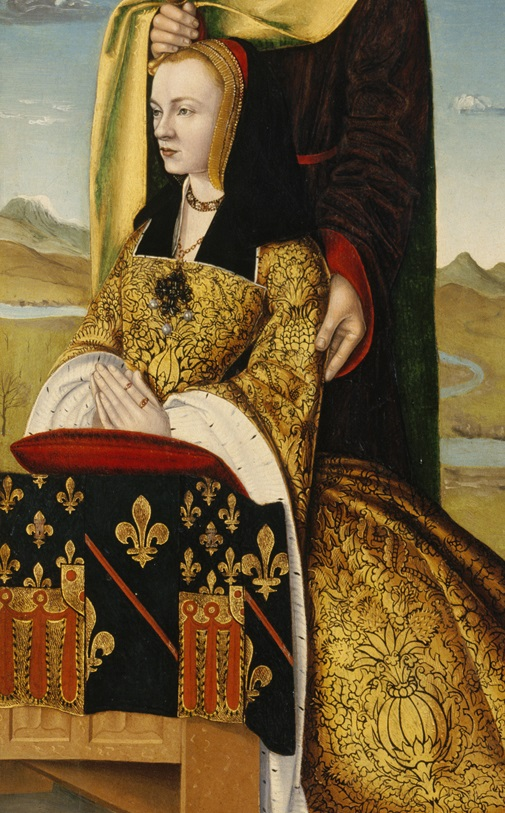
- Detail from The Annunciation with Saints and Donors, c. 1497
- Born: 1465
- Died: 22 January 1511 (aged 45–46)
- Noble family: House of Bourbon
- Spouses: John II, Duke of Bourbon (m. 1487, d. 1488); John III, Count of Auvergne (m. 1495, d. 1501); François de La Pause, baron de la Garde (m. 1503)
- Issue: Louis, Count of Clermont; Anne, Countess of Auvergne; Madeleine de La Tour d'Auvergne
- Father: John II, Count of Vendôme
- Mother: Isabelle de Beauvau

Jeanne de Bourbon (1465 – 22 January 1511) was a daughter of John II, Count of Vendôme and Isabelle de Beauvau. She became Duchess of Bourbon, Countess of Auvergne and Baroness de la Garde by marriage.

== Family and lineage ==
Jeanne was a daughter of John II, Count of Vendôme and Isabelle de Beauvau. She was third child out of eight born to her parents, with her brothers being François, Count of Vendôme and Louis, Prince of La Roche-sur-Yon. When Jeanne was ten years old her mother, Isabelle, died in child-bed giving birth to a daughter, and two years later Jeanne's father also died. She and her siblings were then placed under guardianship of their brother-in-law Louis de Joyeuse.

== Marriages and issues ==
Jeanne married firstly John II, Duke of Bourbon in 1487. She was twenty-two and her groom was sixty-one years old. John had survived two previous wives and his only son and was in a need of a legitimate heir. They had, Louis, Count of Clermont. He was the desired heir but died soon after. John followed his son, Louis, and died in 1488.

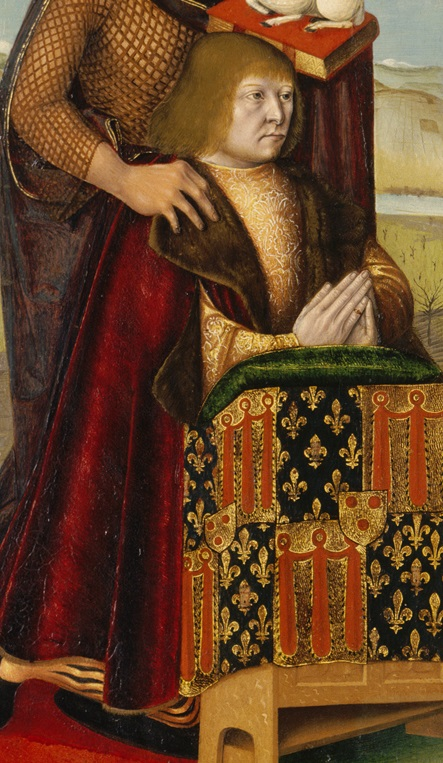
John IV of Auvergne

On 11 January 1495, Jeanne married her second husband John III, Count of Auvergne. They had:

1. Anne, married John Stewart, 2nd Duke of Albany.
2. Madeleine, married Lorenzo II, Duke of Urbino.
3. daughter (b.1501) died young.

John died on 28 March 1501. Jeanne had been given the guardianship of her daughter Anne in her husband's will, this led to her eldest daughter Anne being married off in 1505 – at the insistence of King Louis XII, who wanted to prevent Jeanne and her new husband from gaining too much influence in the county of Auvergne.

On 27 March 1503, aged 38, Jeanne married her third and final husband, François de La Pause, baron de la Garde. They had no children.

== Death ==
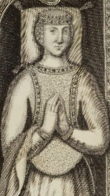
Detail from the illustration of Jeanne de Bourbon-Vendome tomb (1708)

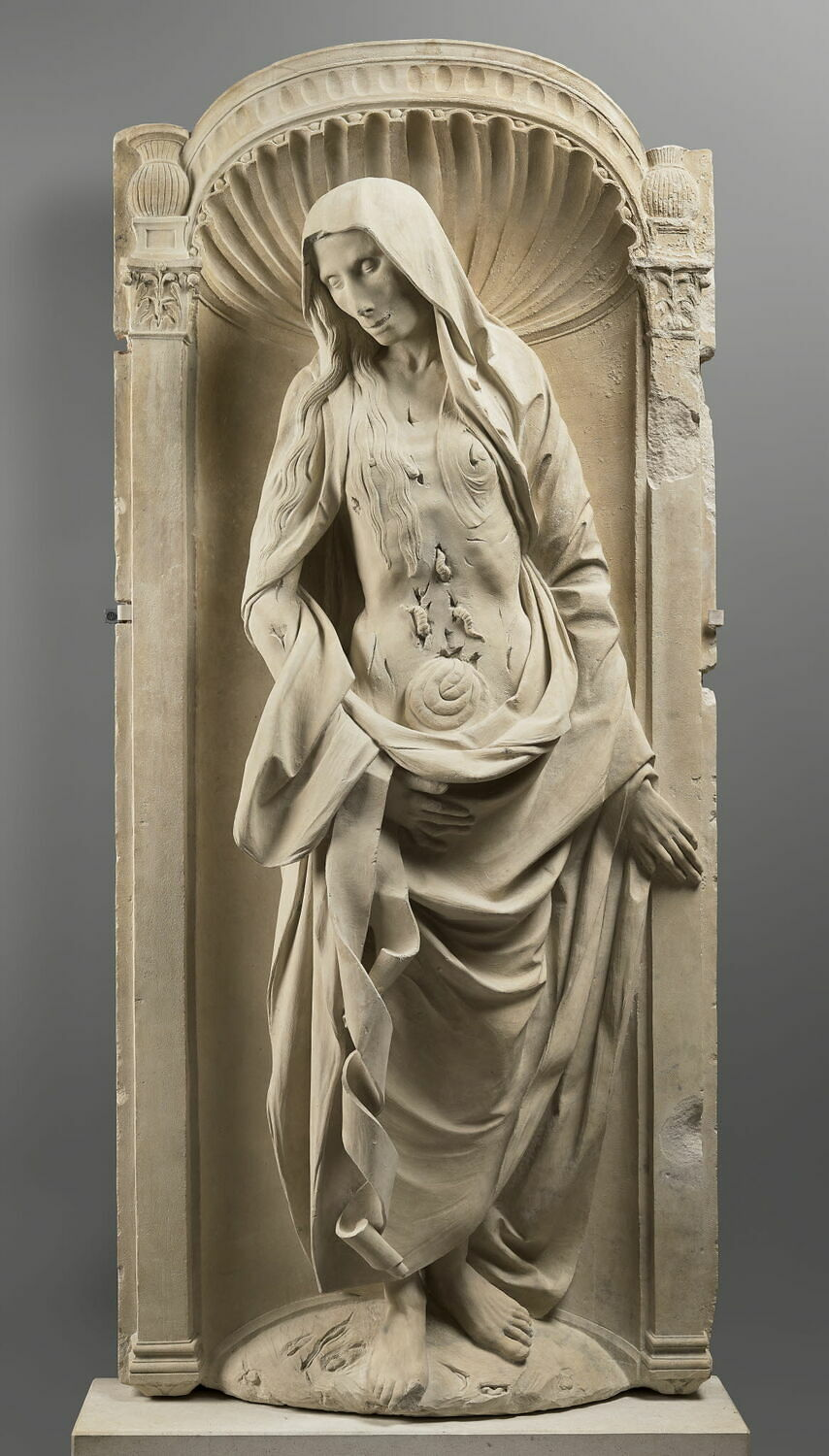
The tomb sculpture of Jeanne Bourbon Vendôme

Jeanne died on the 22 January 1511, and was entombed in the Franciscan convent of the Cordeliers in Vic-le Comte. For the duchess tomb; a magnificent effigy tomb was commissioned with the effigy wearing a crown on her head and her feet resting on a lion, of which now only a stone sculpture of the cadaver monument type (now housed at the Louvre) remains. This sculpture later gave rise to a legend.

== Sources ==
- Antonetti, Guy (2000). "Les Princes Etrangers". In Bardet, Jean-Pierre (ed.). Etat et société en France aux XVIIe et XVIIIe siècles (in French). Presses l'Universite de Paris-Sorbonne.
- Bleeke, Marian (2017). Motherhood and Meaning in Medieval Sculpture: Representations from France, C.1100-1500. The Boydell Press. ISBN 9781783272501.
- Blondeau, Chrystèle; Boissavit-Camus, Brigitte; Boucherat, Véronique; Volti, Panayota, eds. (2013). Ars auro gemmisque prior: Mélanges en hommage à Jean-Pierre Caillet (in French). IRCLAMAM, University of Zagreb. ISBN 9789536002689.
- Commire, Anne; Klezmer, Deborah, eds. (2000). "Jane of Bourbon-Vendome (d.1511)". Women in World History: A Biographical Encyclopedia. Vol. 8. Yorkin Publications.
- Wellman, Kathleen (2013). Queens and Mistresses of Renaissance France. Yale University Press.
