= William XII of Auvergne =

French count

William XII
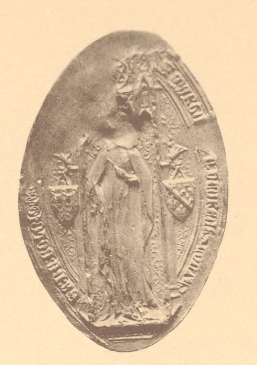
- Seal of William XII's wife, Marguerite dÉvreux

Count of Auvergne and Boulogne
- Reign: 1325–1332
- Predecessor: Robert VII of Auvergne
- Successor: Joan I, Countess of Auvergne
- Born: c. 1304
- Died: 1332
- Noble family: House of Auvergne
- Spouse: Margaret of Évreux
- Issue: Joan I, Countess of Auvergne
- Father: Robert VII of Auvergne
- Mother: Blanche of Bourbon

William XII of Auvergne (c. 1304–1332) was Count of Auvergne and Count of Boulogne between 1325 and 1332. He was the eldest son of Robert VII of Auvergne and Blanche of Bourbon, daughter of Robert, Count of Clermont.

William married Margaret of Évreux (1307–1351), daughter of Louis, Count of Évreux and Margaret of Artois. William died in 1332.

William and Margaret had:

- Joan, his successor and Queen consort of France by her marriage to King John II.

French nobility
Preceded by Robert III and VII	Count of Auvergne and Boulogne; 1325–1332	Succeeded by Joan I

== Sources ==
- Le Bel, Jean (2011). The True Chronicles of Jean Le Bel, 1290-1360. Translated by Bryant, Nigel. Boydell & Brewer.
- La Popelinière, Lancelot-Voisin (2011). Turrel, Denise; Turias, Odette; Rambeaud, Pascal; Souriac, Pierre-Jean (eds.). L'histoire de France (in French). Vol. 1. Librairie Droz S.A.
- de Venette, Jean (1953). Newhall, Richard A. (ed.). The Chronicle of Jean de Venette. Translated by Birdsall, Jean. Columbia University Press.
