= Madeleine de La Tour d'Auvergne =

French noblewoman (1498–1519)

- Duchess of Urbino, Countess of Boulogne, Lady of St Saturnin
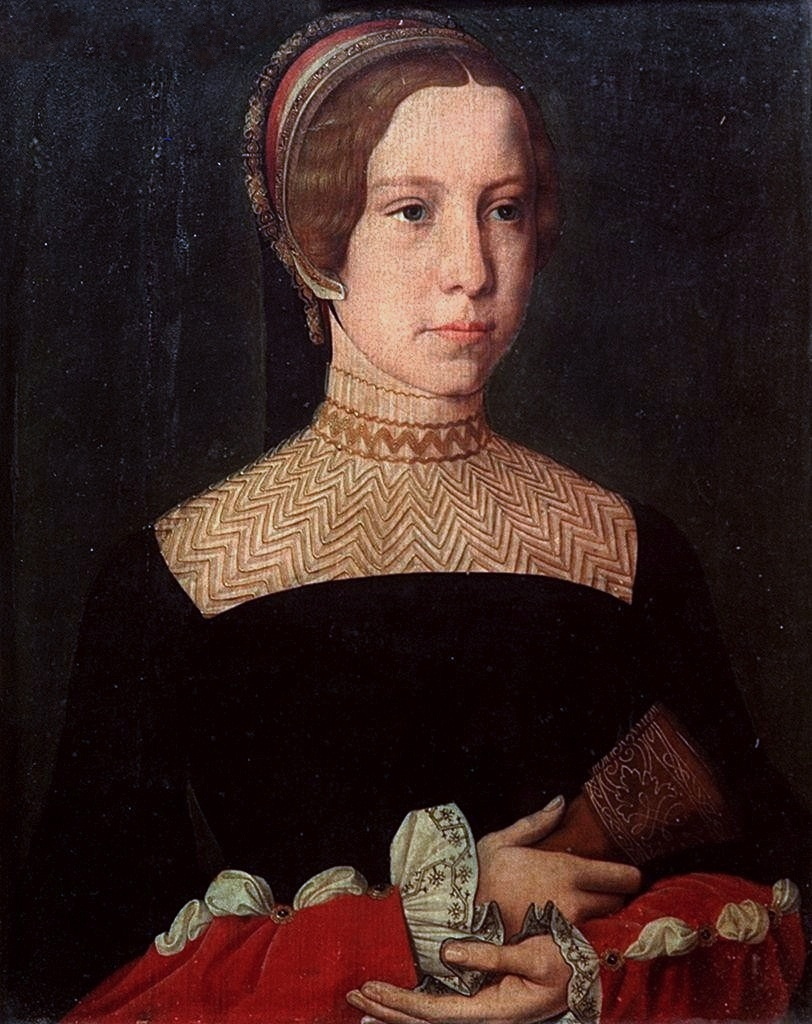
- Portrait of Madeleine de la Tour d'Auvergne attributed to Jean Perréal
- Born: 1498; Auvergne, France
- Died: 28 April 1519 (aged 20–21); Florence
- Noble family: La Tour d'Auvergne
- Spouse: Lorenzo II de' Medici (m. 1518)
- Issue: Catherine, Queen of France
- Father: John III, Count of Auvergne
- Mother: Jeanne de Bourbon-Vendôme

Madeleine de La Tour d'Auvergne (1498 – 28 April 1519), was the penultimate representative of the senior branch of an ancient French House of La Tour d'Auvergne. She is best known for being the mother of Catherine de' Medici, the future Queen of France.

== Biography ==
Madeleine was a younger daughter of Jean III de La Tour (1467– 28 March 1501), Count of Auvergne and Lauraguais, and his wife, Jeanne de Bourbon, Duchess of Bourbon (1465–1511).

Madeleine was betrothed to Lorenzo II de' Medici as part of a French alliance between Francis I of France and Pope Leo X. She and her family were delighted to be tied into the sphere of the Pope himself.

=== Inheritance ===
As both of their parents were deceased, Madeleine and her elder sister Anne shared extensive properties in Auvergne, Clermont, Berry, Castres, and Louraguais.

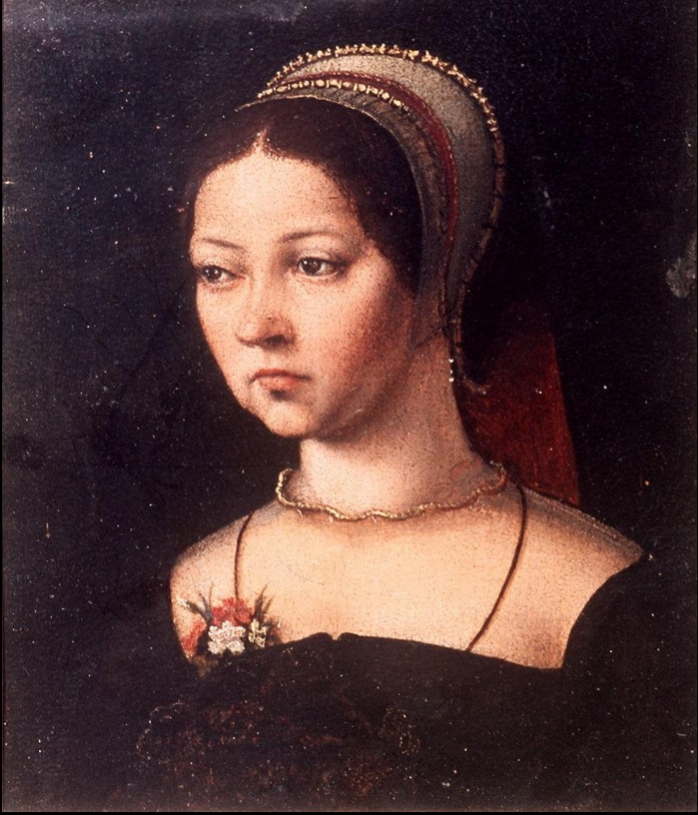
Portrait of a woman (possibly Madeleine de La Tour d'Auvergne), by an anonymous painter

Anne inherited Auvergne and married John Stewart, 2nd Duke of Albany in 1505. She outlived Madeleine by five years but died childless, after which the Counties of Auvergne and Boulogne as well as the barony of La Tour passed to Madeleine's daughter Catherine de' Medici and were then absorbed into the French Crown. (Note: Chang states that Anne made Madeleine's daughter, Catherine, her heir to the Auvergne fortune.)

== Marriage and issue ==
Madeleine married Duke Lorenzo II de' Medici in Château d'Amboise on 5 May 1518. Their wedding was a sumptuous festival that marked not only their union, but also the birth of a dauphin for Francis I.

As with the other festivities Francis put on throughout his life, dancing figured very prominently. Dancing was done mostly in the Italian style. Seventy-two ladies were disguised in Italian, German, and other fashionable costumes, making for quite a rich display of silk and color. Francis gave Madeleine 10,000 gold coins, while Lorenzo offered rich gifts to France's nobility.

On 13 April 1519 Madeleine gave birth to a daughter, Catherine de' Medici, the future Queen of France and consort of Henry II. Both she and her husband were said to have been delighted at the birth of Catherine as if she were a boy.

== Death ==
Madeleine died in Italy shortly before her husband on 28 April 1519, of what is believed to have been the plague (some speculate that she may have been infected by syphilis from her husband).

== See also ==
- House of La Tour d'Auvergne

== Sources ==
- Chang, Leah Redmond (2023). Young Queens: Three Renaissance Women and the Price of Power. Farrar, Straus and Giroux. ISBN 9780374720933.
- McGowan, Margaret M. (2008). Dance in the Renaissance: European Fashion, French Obsession. Yale University Press.
- Wellman, Kathleen (2013). Queens and Mistresses of Renaissance France. Yale University Press.
- Knecht, R.J. (1999). Catherine de' Medici. Pearson Education Limited.
