= Bertrand V of La Tour =

Lord of La Tour
- Reign: 1423-1461
- Predecessor: Bertrand IV
- Successor: Bertrand VI

Count of Auvergne and Boulogne
- Reign: 1437-1461
- Predecessor: Marie I
- Successor: Bertrand VI
- Born: c. 1400
- Died: 20th of March 1461
- Spouse: Jacquette du Peschin
- Issue: Bertrand; Isabelle; Godefroi; Gabrielle; Louise
- House: House of La Tour d'Auvergne
- Father: Bertrand IV of La Tour
- Mother: Marie I

Bertrand V (c. 1400 – 20 March 1461) was lord of La Tour from 1423 and count of Auvergne and Boulogne from 1437 until his death.

== Life ==
In 1423, Bertrand succeeded his father, Bertrand IV, as lord of La Tour.

In 1437, Bertrand succeeded his mother, Marie I, as count of Auvergne and Boulogne.

Bertrand died on 20 March 1461. His first-born son, Bertrand VI, succeeded him in his titles.

== Family and issue ==
In 1416, Betrand married Jacquette du Peschin, daughter of Louis, lord of Peschin, and Yseul of Sens-Beaujeu. Jacquette died after her husband, in 1473. They had six children:

- Bertrand (1417 - 1497), count of Auvergne and Boulogne;
- Gabrielle (c. 1420 - 1474), married in 1442 with Louis de Bourbon, count of Montpensier and dauphin of Auvergne;
- Isabelle (d. 1488), married in 1450 to William, Viscount of Limoges, and in 1457 to Amanieu of Albret;
- Louise (d. 1469), married in 1456 to Jean de Créquy;
- Blanche (d. 1472), abbess of Cusset;
- Godfrey (d. 1469), lord of Montgascon.

French nobility
Preceded by Marie I and II	Count of Auvergne and Boulogne; 1437–1461	Succeeded by Bertrand II
Preceded by Bertrand IV	Lord of La Tour; 1423–1461	Succeeded by Bertrand VI
