= Marie I of Auvergne =

Marie I (September 1376 – 7 August 1437) was suo jure countess of Auvergne and Boulogne from 1424 to her death in 1437, having inherited the titles from her cousin Joan II. She was the wife of Bertrand IV de La Tour and the mother of Bertrand V de La Tour who succeeded her as count of Auvergne and Boulogne.

== Life ==
Marie was born in France in September 1376, the only child of Godfroy of Auvergne, Seigneur de Montgascon, Seigneur de Roche-Savine, and his second wife Jeanne de Ventadour. Her mother died shortly after Marie's birth on 19 September 1376. Her father married thirdly Blanche de Bouteiller de Senlis, which produced two half-siblings, Antoine and Marguerite. Her father died in 1385, when Marie was nine years of age .

Sometime after 11 January 1389, Marie married Bertrand IV, Seigneur de La Tour, the son of Guy de La Tour and Marthe Rogier de Beaufort. Her husband Bertrand died in 1423, sometime after 23 September. She inherited her titles the following year.

=== Reign ===
She succeeded her cousin Joan II as Countess of Auvergne and Boulogne upon the latter's death in 1424, as Joan's marriages to John, Duke of Berry, and Georges de la Trémoille had been childless.

She ruled as countess until her own death, which occurred on 7 August 1437. Her only son, Bertrand succeeded her as count of Auvergne and Boulogne.

== Issue ==
Marie and Bertrand had four children:

- Bertrand V of La Tour, Seigneur de La Tour, Count of Auvergne and Boulogne (died March 1461), married in 1416 Jacquette du Peschin (c.1400- 1473) by whom he had six children. His descendants (among which there is his great-granddaughter Marie d'Albret, Countess of Rethel) were known by the name of de La Tour d'Auvergne.
- Jeanne de La Tour (c.1390- before 1416), married Beraud III, Count of Clermont (1375–1426) by whom she had one daughter, Jeanne.
- Isabelle de La Tour (b.1395), married 12 September 1419 Louis Armand Chalancon, Viscount of Polignac (1379-1452) by whom she had six children.
- Louise de La Tour (died 14 June 1471), married firstly Tristan de Clermont-Lodève; she married secondly Claude de Montagu, Seigneur de Couches et d'Espoisses. Both marriages were childless.

French nobility
Preceded by Joan II	Countess of Auvergne and Boulogne; 1424–1437	Succeeded by Bertrand I
