= Bertrand de La Tour (died 1382) =

French prince-bishop (c.1327–1382)

Personal details
- Born: 1327
- Died: 1382 (aged 54–55)
- Parents: Bertrand III, Lord of La Tour; Isabelle de Lévis

Bishop of Toul
- In office 1353–1361
- Preceded by: Thomas de Bourlémont
- Succeeded by: Pierre-Raymond de la Barrière

Bishop of Le Puy-en-Velay
- In office 1361–1382
- Preceded by: Jean de Jourens
- Succeeded by: Bertrand de Chanac

Bertrand de la Tour (c. 1327–1382) was the prince-bishop of Toul from 1353 to 1361 and then bishop of Le Puy from 1361 until his death.

== Life ==
Bertrand was born around 1327, son of Bertrand III, lord of La Tour and Isabelle de Lévis.

In 1353, Innocent VI elected him bishop of Toul, with his temporal post as prince-bishop being granted in 1354 by Charles IV.

During his tenure hesigned a treaty with Brocard de Fenétrange, lieutenant-general of Lorraine during the minority of Duke John I, to defend his diocese against bands of adventurers who were pillaging it. The regent of Lorraine, Duchess Marie de Châtillon, asserted the right of the Dukes of Lorraine to govern the Toul region, a claim opposed by the burghers of Toul, who appealed to Robert I, Duke of Bar, for help. Bertrand, to further his own interests and those of the Lorrainers, placed Barrois under interdict. This made the Duke of Bar agree to a peace, under the condition that the Duchess renounced Toul and be contented with a payament. She agreed, allowing a peace treaty to be signed in 1356.

In 1361, Innocent VI transferred away Bertrand from Toul and made him bishop of Le Puy.

He died in 1382.
