= John IV of Auvergne =

John III of Auvergne
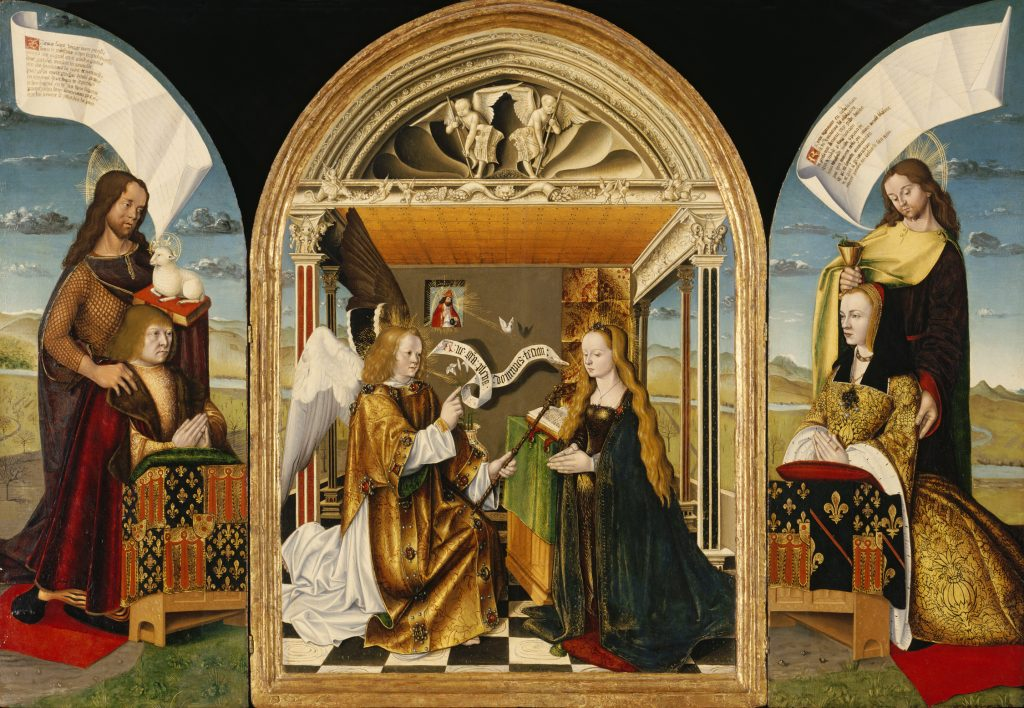
- Born: 1467
- Died: 28 March 1501 (aged 33–34); Orléans
- Noble family: La Tour d'Auvergne
- Spouse: Jeanne de Bourbon-Vendôme
- Issue: Anne, Countess of Auvergne; Madeleine de La Tour d'Auvergne
- Father: Bertrand VI, Count of Auvergne
- Mother: Louise de La Trémoille

John III of Auvergne (1467 – 28 March 1501), Count of Auvergne, Count of Boulogne, Count de Lauraguais, was the son of Bertrand VI, Count of Auvergne and Louise de La Trémoille, Dame de Boussac, the daughter of Georges de la Trémoille. He was the last in the male line of Counts of Auvergne from the La Tour d'Auvergne family.

== Family and children ==
John married Jeanne de Bourbon-Vendôme, daughter of Jean VIII, Count of Vendôme, and Isabelle, Dame de la Roche-sur-Yon, on 11 January 1495. They had:

1. Anne, married John Stewart, 2nd Duke of Albany
2. Madeleine, married Lorenzo II, Duke of Urbino

== Sources ==
- Bleeke, Marian (2017). Motherhood and Meaning in Medieval Sculpture: Representations from France, c.1100-1500. The Boydell Press.
- Pitts, Vincent Joseph (1993). The Man who Sacked Rome: Charles de Bourbon, Constable of France (1490-1527). Peter Lang. ISBN 0-8204-2456-0.
- Wellman, Kathleen (2013). Queens and Mistresses of Renaissance France. Yale University Press.

John IV of Auvergne House of La Tour d'Auvergne Born: 1467 Died: 28 March 1501
| Preceded by Bertrand VI | Count of Auvergne; 1497–1501 | Succeeded by Anne |
| Preceded by Bertrand VI | Lord of La Tour; 1497–1501 | Succeeded by Anne |
| Preceded by Bertrand VI | Count of Lauragais; 1497–1501 | Succeeded by Madeleine |
