= Anne de La Tour d'Auvergne =

Countess of Auvergne and Duchess of Albany

Anne de la Tour d'Auvergne
- Countess of Auvergne
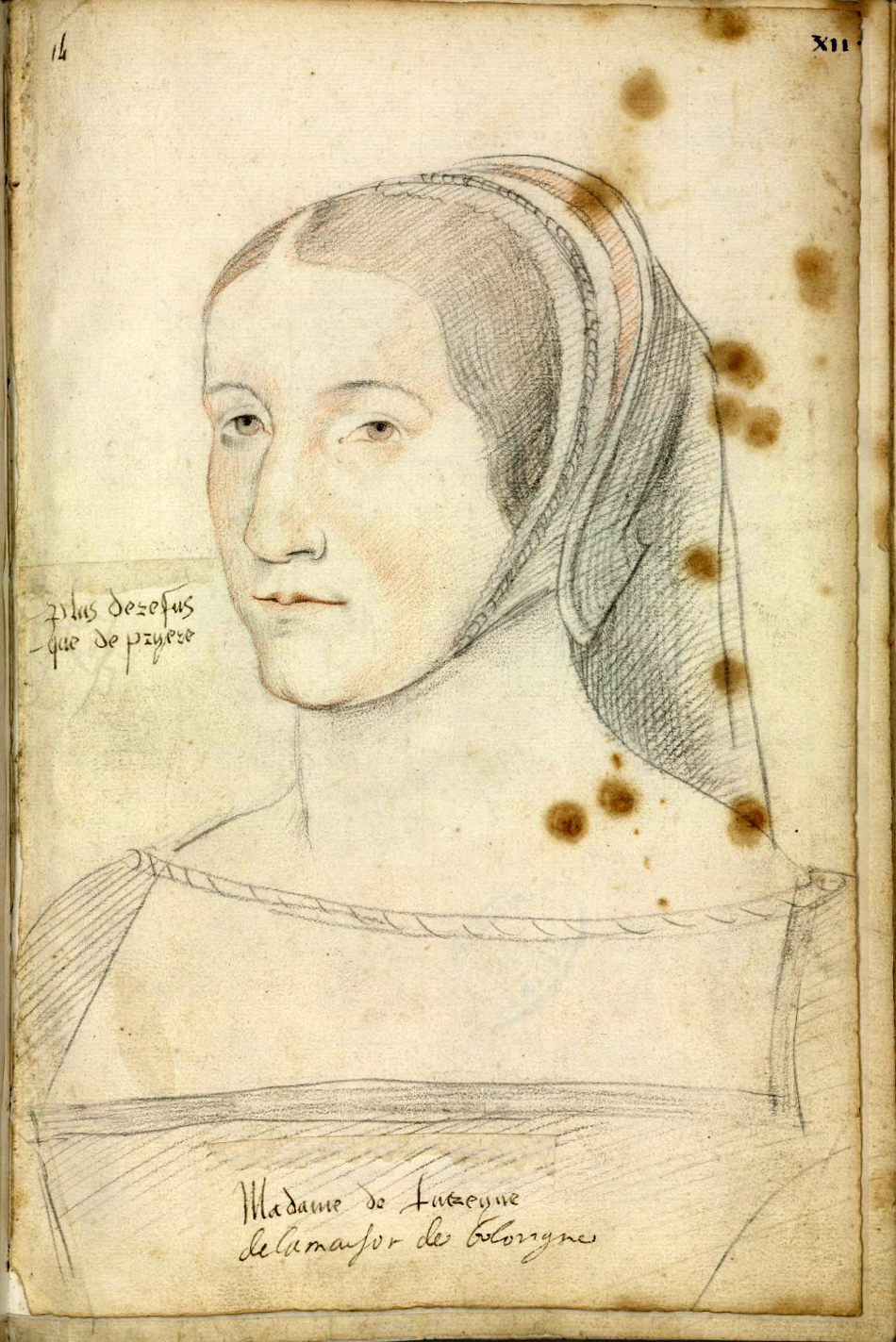
- A contemporary portrait of Anne de la Tour d'Auvergne
- Born: 1496
- Died: 1524 (aged 28)
- Noble family: La Tour d'Auvergne
- Spouse: John Stewart, Duke of Albany
- Father: John III, Count of Auvergne
- Mother: Jeanne de Bourbon-Vendôme

Anne de La Tour d'Auvergne (1496–1524) was sovereign Countess of Auvergne from 1501 until 1524, and Duchess of Albany by marriage to John Stewart, Duke of Albany.

== Biography ==
Anne was the elder of two daughters born to Jean III of la Tour d'Auvergne and Jeanne of Bourbon. Her younger sister was Madeleine de La Tour d'Auvergne, who would marry Lorenzo II de' Medici and become the mother of Catherine de' Medici. As the elder daughter, Anne was her father's heiress.

== Marriage ==
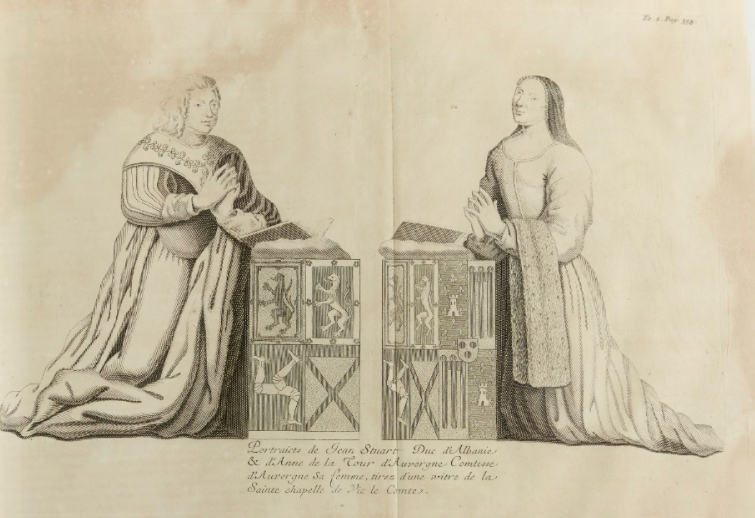
Jean Staurt et Anne de La Tour

On 13 July 1505, she married her first cousin John Stewart, Duke of Albany, the intermittent heir presumptive to the Kingdom of Scotland and its sometime-regent, who lived in France as a sort of exile.

== Death and inheritance ==
Anne died in 1524 at her castle of Saint-Saturnin, leaving her inheritance (the feudal county of Auvergne) to her niece, Catherine de' Medici (born 1519), daughter of her late younger sister Madeleine and Lorenzo II, Duke of Urbino.

A manuscript detailing Anne's inheritance, with pictures of her castles in Auvergne, and her descent from the legendary Belle Moree, daughter of a Pharaoh, survives in the Royal Library of the Hague. The Bibliothèque nationale de France has another manuscript version of this fabulous genealogy, and a similar inventory of Auvergne castles made for Catherine de' Medici. Anne and the Duke of Albany were painted in a stained-glass window at Vic-le-Comte.

== Sources ==
- Bleeke, Marian (2017). Motherhood and Meaning in Medieval Sculpture: Representations from France, C.1100-1500. The Boydell Press.
- Chang, Leah Redmond (2023). Young Queens: Three Renaissance Women and the Price of Power. Farrar, Straus and Giroux. ISBN 9780374720933.
- Coombs, B., 'The Artistic Patronage of John Stuart, Duke of Albany, 1518-19: The 'Discovery' of the Artist and Author, Bremond Domat', The Proceedings of the Society of Antiquaries of Scotland, 144 (2014).
- Coombs, B., 'The Artistic Patronage of John Stuart, Duke of Albany, 1520-1530: Vic-le-Comte, the Last Sainte-Chapelle', Proceedings of the Society of Antiquaries of Scotland, 147 (2017).

Preceded by John III	Countess of Auvergne; 1501–1524	Succeeded by Catherine
