= John Stewart, Duke of Albany =

Scottish Prince and regent

John Stewart
- Duke of Albany, Count of Auvergne and Lauraguais
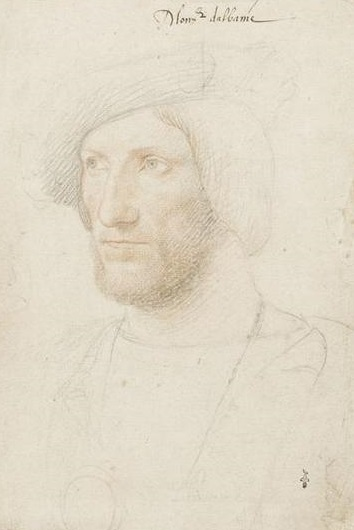

Regent of Scotland
- Regency: 1515–1524
- Monarch: James V
- Born: 8 July 1482
- Died: 2 June 1536 (aged 54–55); Castle of Mirefleurs, Auvergne, France
- Noble family: Stewart
- Spouse: Anne de La Tour d'Auvergne
- Father: Alexander Stewart, Duke of Albany
- Mother: Anne, Countess of La Chambre

John Stewart, 2nd Duke of Albany (8 July 1482 – 2 June 1536) was the regent of the Kingdom of Scotland and the count of Auvergne and Lauraguais in France.

== Early life ==
John was a son of Alexander Stewart, Duke of Albany, son of King James II of Scotland. He was the only son of his father's second marriage, to Anne de la Tour d'Auvergne, daughter of Bertrand VI of Auvergne. The ambitious though unsuccessful Alexander had fled Scotland to France in 1479, and married Anne. He then returned to Scotland after reconciliation with his brother the king, but in 1483 fled to France a second time, being placed in Scotland under a sentence of death for treason. John was born in France, although it is unclear whether this was during his father's first or second stay there, and grew up there with his French mother.

Alexander was killed in Paris accidentally in a tournament in 1485 when John was still an infant. He had earlier been married with Catherine Sinclair, daughter of the 3rd Earl of Orkney, but that marriage had been dissolved in 1478, however having produced half-brothers to John. Question of their illegitimacy caused uncertainty in succession, but the infant John was eventually recognized as duke after his father's death. He thus inherited Duchy of Albany and Earldom of March.

On 15 February 1487, his mother married Louis de Seyssel, "comte de La Chambre", who became John's stepfather.

== Heir presumptive ==
Albany was his whole life the next heir of the Kingdom of Scotland after male members of the king's immediate family, due to stipulations of the semi-Salic succession order enacted by King Robert II which favored male agnates over all females of the Royal House of Stewart. The sons of the immediate royal family proved to be short-lived except Albany's first cousins James, Duke of Ross, King James IV and the latter's son the future King James V (who died in 1542, only five years after Albany).

Thus Albany was from 1504 onwards either the heir presumptive or the second-in-line to the throne of Kingdom of Scotland. After 1504, despite which minor was heir in front of him, Albany was always the closest heir who was not underage. During the minority of King James V, Albany acted as regent intermittently between 1514 and 1524.

On 8 July 1505, the young Albany married his first cousin Anne, Countess of Auvergne and Lauraguais (eldest daughter and heiress of Albany's maternal uncle John III, Count of Auvergne who had died in 1501). Thus John started to enjoy the position and rights of Count of Auvergne and Lauraguais in France, until Anne's death in 1524. A manuscript detailing her estate with pictures of her castles still exists (see references).

Albany's mother Anne, Countess of La Chambre, died on 13 October 1512. (The step-father, Louis de La Chambre, lived until 1517.)

== Regency of Scotland ==
Albany was called to assume the regency of Scotland in 1514 when the infant king's mother, Margaret Tudor married Archibald Douglas, 6th Earl of Angus. Angus led his own faction in Scotland and was opposed by other noble groups. Albany arrived at Dumbarton with a squadron of eight ships, including the James and Margaret, which James IV had lent to Louis XII of France, on 26 May 1515. Albany was inaugurated as Regent with the sceptre and sword of honour.

Albany utilized the Scottish nobility's innate distrust of Margaret Tudor. He besieged the queen at Stirling Castle, bringing as many as 7,000 men and artillery including the cannon Mons Meg. Despite plans to resist Albany and demonstrate that he was making war against the young king's person, Margaret surrendered on 6 August and Albany gained possession of the royal children. Albany thus succeeded in making himself the sole regent. After two years of this uneasy situation, in 1516 Margaret had to flee to England. The fragmentary and quarrelous politics of Scotland overthrew and also restored Albany's powers several times.

The earl of Angus made his peace with Albany later in 1516. Between 1517 and 1520 Albany sojourned in France, and did not exercise the regency on spot, but through his lieutenants including Antoine d'Arces, sieur de la Bastie. On 26 August 1517, Albany and Charles, Duke of Alençon signed the Treaty of Rouen, which renewed the "auld alliance" between France and Scotland, and promised a French royal bride for James V. The poet and diplomat Gavin Douglas, Bishop of Dunkeld assisted in the negotiations.

On 16 January 1518, the duke's sister-in-law, Madeleine de la Tour who was his legal ward (pupille), married Lorenzo de' Medici, Duke of Urbino at the Château d'Amboise. Lorenzo was a nephew of Pope Leo X. In April 1518 Albany attended the christening of the Dauphin Francis, Lorenzo held the child at the font as the Pope's representative. Leonardo da Vinci designed the decorations at Amboise for the ceremony. In July 1518 Albany and Lorenzo were at the Castle of Saint-Saturnin in Auvergne and made a contract dividing their wives' Auvergne heritage lands between them. In March 1519, Pope Leo X confirmed the ancient privileges of the Scottish crown noting that he acted on the supplication of Albany, his dilecti filli, "beloved nephew". (Note: Some sources date the marriage to May 1518, and the christening to April 1519, probably confusing old-style dates.)

In the summer of 1520, Albany went to Rome. The Master of Papal ceremonies took offence when Albany arrived at the Vatican during Vespers and sat with the Cardinals on Ascension Day. He made Albany get up, and while waiting for the Pope, Albany sat on a Cardinal's foot-stool. Subsequently, the Cardinal of Ancona formally presented Albany's request for an audience with the Pope, as the guardian of James V. Pope Leo issued a new bull confirming his protection of Scotland and James V and affirming Albany's regency. Albany returned to Scotland in November 1521.

In Scotland Queen Margaret sought to regain the regency, but in vain. Young King James was kept a virtual prisoner by Albany, and Queen Margaret was allowed to see her son only once between 1516 and end of Albany's regency. Margaret started to try get a divorce from Angus, also through Albany secretly. When Albany returned in November 1521 Margaret now sided with him against her husband. He came to Edinburgh Castle, where James V was kept, and in a public ceremony, the keeper gave him the keys, which he passed to Margaret, who gave them back to Albany, symbolising that government of Scotland was in his hands. Thus Albany was able to keep an upper hand in regard to the ambitious Angus. The regent took the government into his own hands. Albany put Angus under charges of high treason in December 1521 and later sent him practically a prisoner to France. Angus's representative, Gavin Douglas, complained about Albany's government to Henry VIII.

In November 1522, Albany took an army to besiege Wark Castle defended by Sir William Lisle but gave up after three days when the weather deteriorated. The English were warned of his plans by the Prioress of Coldstream and the Prioress of Eccles. The English commanders shared an anecdote of Albany's character, a tendency to anger which was seen as a weakness. When in a rage, after hearing bad news, he was known to throw his bonnet in the fire. This had happened several times.

The 12-year-old James V's minority was proclaimed to end in 1524, as Queen Dowager Margaret and her supporters (such as Albany's first cousin, James Hamilton, 1st Earl of Arran) wanted to grab power. Albany was ousted completely by this. He discussed his plans and desires for Scotland in Edinburgh's Tolbooth. He would go to France with David Beaton, hoping that the Treaty of Rouen would be observed. He wanted Margaret Tudor to remain at Stirling Castle with James V and contract no further treaties with Henry VIII. She refused this. The Lords refused Albany's suggestion that his servant Grisels should be treasurer of Scotland. Albany left for France from Dumbarton Castle.

Angus returned to Scotland and took Edinburgh in February 1525. The subsequently summoned parliament sealed, in turn also the Queen's defeat by making Angus a Lord of the Articles, included in the council of regency, and bearer of the king's crown on the opening of the session, and with Archbishop Beaton held the chief power. After being overthrown from the Scottish regency, Albany lived mainly in France.

== Military service in France and the Four Years' War ==
During the Italian Wars (1521–1525), between France, Spain and the Holy Roman Empire, Albany was placed in command of a third of Francis I's Army and sent to attack the Papal forces and to launch an assault on Naples, then held by the Spanish. Due to inept leadership the remaining two-thirds of the army met with Imperial forces at Pavia in 1525 and were routed with Francis and countless other French nobles taken hostage. Albany's section of the army suffered numerous ambushes and desertions, and he returned to a cowed France without having reached Naples.

== Later years ==
Francis I ordered his goldsmith Pierre Mangot to make Albany a new gold collar for his Order of Saint Michael, to recoup his losses and expenses on the road to Pavia. In June 1527 a servant of the Duke of Albany, William Stewart, went to Scotland with gifts of horses and swords for the young James V. He hired a team of masons to amend and repair the fortification at Dunbar Castle.

Albany went to Rome as a diplomat working for France and Scotland. The Spanish ambassador Miçer Mai mentions meeting him at the Papal Palace and then holding negotiations at the Imperial Embassy in August 1531. Albany was delegated to negotiate with Pope Clement VII for a marriage between James V and Catherine de' Medici, the young Duchess of Urbino in 1530. This was perhaps a diplomatic manoeuvre to force Francis I of France to honour a clause in the 1517 Treaty of Rouen which promised the Scottish King a royal French bride. In May 1531, Albany was instructed that this marriage was off, and it was planned that James V would be engaged to Christina of Denmark.

Francis I of France met John Stewart at Riom in the Auvergne on 10 July 1533. They received Thomas Howard, 3rd Duke of Norfolk. Sir Anthony Browne, Keeper of the Jewels of Henry VIII of England, described the reception of the French king at nearby towns organised by Albany in his letter to Thomas Cromwell. Charles, Duke of Vendôme also attended the meeting at Riom. In June, Francis had written to James V of Scotland from Lyon that he would offer him a bride from a noble French family, "as if she were his proper daughter." Two years later, James V of Scotland commissioned Albany to contract his marriage to Charles of Vendôme's daughter, Mary of Bourbon. James V subsequently travelled to France to meet Mary of Bourbon but married the Princess Madeleine of Valois instead.

Albany and the Duchess of Vendôme were at Cambrai on 16 August 1535 with the Queen of France and met the Queen of Hungary. The daughters of the Francis I were there too. In 1533, Catherine, one of his closest surviving relatives, who held him as an uncle and sort of guardian, came from Italy to marry Henry, Duke of Orleans, second son of King Francis I. In 1536, young Henry became Dauphin of France and Catherine was destined to become queen.

== Death ==
Albany died at Mirefleur Castle in the Auvergne on 2 June 1536.

Albany's wife, Duchess Anne had died at Saint-Saturnin in June 1524. Duchess Anne left her inheritance in Auvergne to her infant niece, Catherine de' Medici (b. 1519), daughter of John's first cousin and Anne's younger sister, the late Madeleine of Auvergne, and Lorenzo, Duke of Urbino. Catherine, or rather her guardians in France, thus received the County of Auvergne.

When Albany died, the penultimate unquestionably legitimate agnate of the Royal House of Stewart, the position of next heir of Scotland went for the first time to a descendant from the female line, which at the time was another great-grandson of King James II, James Hamilton, 2nd Earl of Arran (c. 1516–75) (that is, until the birth of Mary just 6 days before the death of James V). In the ordinary parlance of Scotland at the time, Arran became "second person".

== European craftsmen in Scotland ==
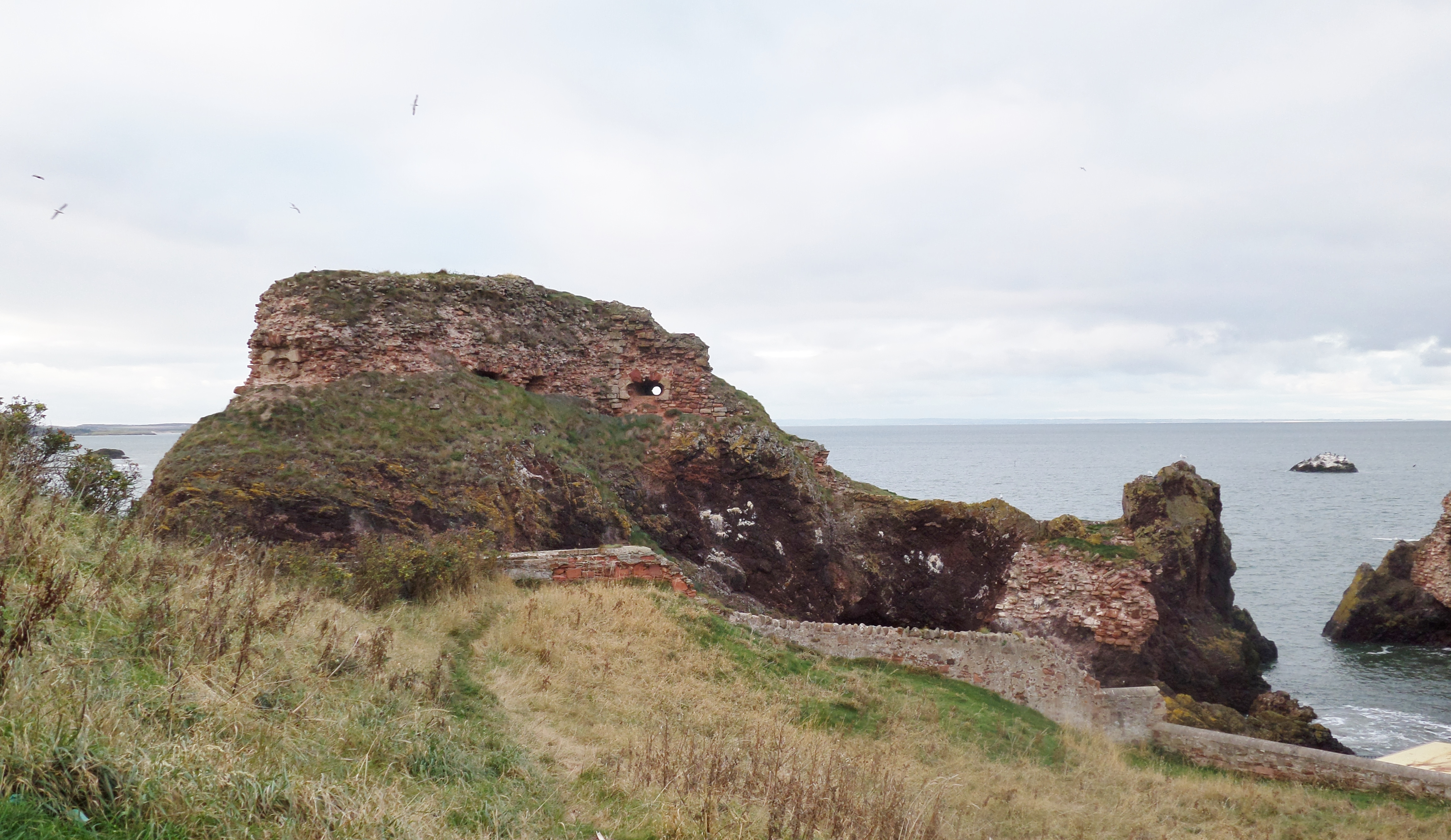
Albany's artillery blockhouse at Dunbar Castle

Albany brought a number of foreign craftsmen to work in Scotland in 1515. At Crawford Moor, "Johne Drane", a Frenchman was a refiner, washer, and melter of gold. "Johne Belloun", Frenchmen or "Master Johne Carvour" worked on new windows and doors for the Palace of Holyroodhouse, and repaired a number of spears and pikes. Albany's works at Holyrood included a wooden staircase.

A French gunner, Jehannot de Lavall was appointed as master keeper and governor of the royal artillery in April 1516. An Italian called "Auld Julian" made 6000 bricks at Tranent to be used for building a furnace at the armoury in Edinburgh Castle, where the master gun-founder Robert Borthwick was joined by the Frenchmen, "Johne Bukkat" and his apprentice "Perys". Two of the cannons they made, marked with the Duke's arms and listed as "quarter-falcons", were still in use at Edinburgh Castle in 1579.

Praise for Albany's improvements in Scotland was published in the Sommaire de l'Origine Description et Merveilles d'Escosse (1538) by Jehan dit Le-Fresne Desmontiers. Albany was linked to his buildings at Dunbar Castle which he rendered impregnable with an artillery blockhouse (which survives in ruins), and he was said to have improved agriculture in Scotland. An article by the historian Bryony Coombs further explores the activities of the Duke of Albany and his architectural and artistic connections that informed the design of the artillery blockhouse at Dunbar Castle and situates the building in a European context.

== Children ==
Albany had at least three children by his wife Anne but none survived to adulthood.

By a Scotswoman, Jean Abernethy, Albany had an illegitimate daughter named Eleanor Stewart. Eleanor was legitimized and married to Jean de L'Hopital, comte de Choisy in Fontainebleau on 22 October 1547, in the presence of Henry II of France. Choisy later became the tutor of the Dauphin Francis (d. 1560).

The descendants of their son Jacques de L'Hopital, 1st Marquess of Choisy, include the Dukes of Castries and the MacMahon Dukes of Magenta.

== Notes ==
Peerage of Scotland
Preceded by Alexander Stewart	Duke of Albany; 2nd creation 1485–1536	Extinct
