= Luzillat =

- Commune
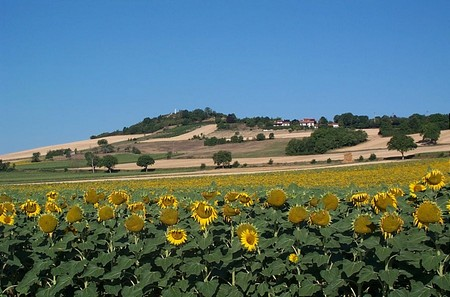
- The landscape of Luzillat
- Location of Luzillat
- Location within France Location within Auvergne-Rhône-Alpes
- Coordinates: 45°56′49″N 3°23′27″E
- Country: France
- Region: Auvergne-Rhône-Alpes
- Department: Puy-de-Dôme
- Arrondissement: Riom
- Canton: Maringues
- Intercommunality: CC Plaine Limagne

Government
  - Mayor (2026–32): Claude Raynaud
- Area^{1}: 23.19 km^{2} (8.95 sq mi)
- Highest elevation: 415 m (1,362 ft)
- Lowest elevation: 274 m (899 ft)
- Population (2023): 1,163
  - Density: 50.15/km^{2} (129.9/sq mi)
- Time zone: UTC+01:00 (CET)
  - Summer (DST): UTC+02:00 (CEST)
- INSEE/Postal code: 63201 /63350
- ^{1} French Land Register data, which excludes lakes, ponds, glaciers > 1 km^{2} (0.386 sq mi or 247 acres) and river estuaries.

Luzillat (French pronunciation: [lyzija]) is a commune in the Puy-de-Dôme department in Auvergne in central France.

== See also ==
- Communes of the Puy-de-Dôme department
