= Vic-le-Comte =

Vic-le-Comte La Còmta (Occitan)
- Commune
- The town hall in Vic-le-Comte

- Coat of arms
- Location of Vic-le-Comte
- Location within France Location within Auvergne-Rhône-Alpes
- Coordinates: 45°38′38″N 3°14′48″E
- Country: France
- Region: Auvergne-Rhône-Alpes
- Department: Puy-de-Dôme
- Arrondissement: Clermont-Ferrand
- Canton: Vic-le-Comte
- Intercommunality: Mond'Arverne Communauté

Government
  - Mayor (2026–32): Antoine Desforges
- Area^{1}: 18.09 km^{2} (6.98 sq mi)
- Elevation: 472 m (1,549 ft)
- Highest elevation: 806 m (2,644 ft)
- Lowest elevation: 331 m (1,086 ft)
- Population (2023): 5,396
  - Density: 298.3/km^{2} (772.6/sq mi)
- Demonym: Vicomtois
- Time zone: UTC+01:00 (CET)
  - Summer (DST): UTC+02:00 (CEST)
- INSEE/Postal code: 63457 /63270
- Website: www.vic-le-comte.fr
- ^{1} French Land Register data, which excludes lakes, ponds, glaciers > 1 km^{2} (0.386 sq mi or 247 acres) and river estuaries.

Vic-le-Comte (French pronunciation: [vikləkɔ̃t]; lit. 'Vic-the-Count'; Occitan: La Còmta or Vic la Còmte) is a commune in the Puy-de-Dôme department in Auvergne in central France. It is situated about 20 km (12 mi) southeast of Clermont-Ferrand.

== Population ==
Historical population
Year	Pop.	±% p.a.
1968	2,627	—
1975	3,130	+2.53%
1982	3,755	+2.63%
1990	4,155	+1.27%
1999	4,404	+0.65%
2007	4,607	+0.56%
2012	4,910	+1.28%
2017	5,197	+1.14%
2023	5,396	+0.63%
Source: INSEE

== See also ==
- Communes of the Puy-de-Dôme department
