= Georges de La Trémoille =

French diplomat (c. 1382–1446)

- Escutcheon (heraldry) of the Trémoille family
- Born: c. 1382
- Died: 6 May 1446
- Title: Grand chambellan de France
- Spouses: Joan II of Auvergne; Catherine de L'Isle-Bouchard
- Parents: Gui VI of La Trémoille (father); Marie de Sully (mother)
- Family: La Trémoille

Georges de la Trémoille (c. 1382 – 6 May 1446) was Count of Guînes from 1398 to 1446 and Grand Chamberlain of France to King Charles VII of France. He sought reconciliation between Philip, Duke of Burgundy and Charles VII during their estrangement in the latter part of the Hundred Years' War and was a political opponent of Arthur de Richemont within the French court. Most historians take a poor view of his career and assess that he placed personal advancement before the public interest, but the traditional historical interpretation of the Grand Chamberlain as Joan of Arc's opponent has been revised.

De la Trémoille was captured at Agincourt in 1415. He regained his freedom shortly afterward and dedicated the rest of his career to court life and diplomacy. He made an advantageous marriage to Joan II of Auvergne (1378–1424), Countess of Auvergne and Boulogne (1404–1424). De la Trémoille served the Burgundian court for several years and then joined the Armagnac court of Charles VII.

De la Trémoille became a royal favourite in After. He gained the title of Grand Chamberlain and was instrumental in Constable de Richemont's expulsion from the court that same year. After Joan of Arc's successful campaign to Rheims for the coronation of Charles VII, de la Trémoille delayed a march on Paris with fruitless peace negotiations. He may have been responsible for the lack of royal support that doomed her military actions thereafter. The historical consensus is that personal jealousies led him to undermine France's two best military commanders during a low point in the war. In September 1432, he paid for Rodrigo de Villandrando and his routiers to hold Les Ponts-de-Cé against the assaults of Jean de Bueil. That year, de Richemont returned to court and imprisoned de la Trémoille the following year. Charles VII did not intervene.

His daughter Louise de La Trémoïlle (1432 – 10 April 1474), Dame de Boussac, married Bertrand VI of Auvergne and had three known children:

- Anne de la Tour d'Auvergne, second wife of Alexander Stewart, Duke of Albany
- John III, Count of Auvergne
- Jeanne de La Tour d'Auvergne paternal grandmother of Diane de Poitiers

De La Trémoïlle also had descents by his two mistresses: by Marie Guypaude, a daughter named Marguerite, who married Jean Salazar, and a son named Jean the "bastard of La Tremoïlle" (legitimated and ennobled in 1445), and by Marie La Championne, Jacques, the other "bastard of La Tremoïlle", legitimized in 1466.
