= Yronde-et-Buron =

- Commune
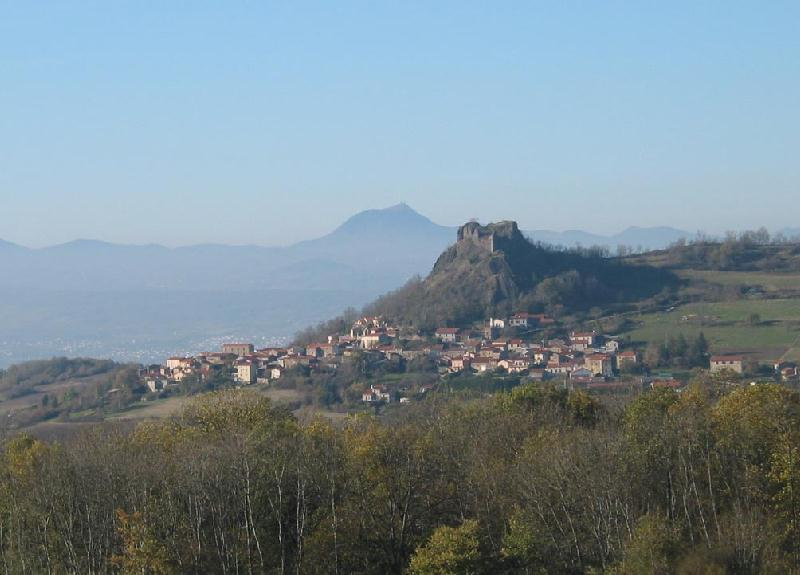
- A general view of Yronde-et-Buron
- Location of Yronde-et-Buron
- Location within France Location within Auvergne-Rhône-Alpes
- Coordinates: 45°36′47″N 3°15′18″E
- Country: France
- Region: Auvergne-Rhône-Alpes
- Department: Puy-de-Dôme
- Arrondissement: Clermont-Ferrand
- Canton: Vic-le-Comte
- Intercommunality: Mond'Arverne Communauté

Government
  - Mayor (2026–32): Eric Therond
- Area^{1}: 14.79 km^{2} (5.71 sq mi)
- Elevation: 520 m (1,710 ft)
- Highest elevation: 824 m (2,703 ft)
- Lowest elevation: 344 m (1,129 ft)
- Population (2023): 642
  - Density: 43.4/km^{2} (112/sq mi)
- Time zone: UTC+01:00 (CET)
  - Summer (DST): UTC+02:00 (CEST)
- INSEE/Postal code: 63472 /63270
- ^{1} French Land Register data, which excludes lakes, ponds, glaciers > 1 km^{2} (0.386 sq mi or 247 acres) and river estuaries.

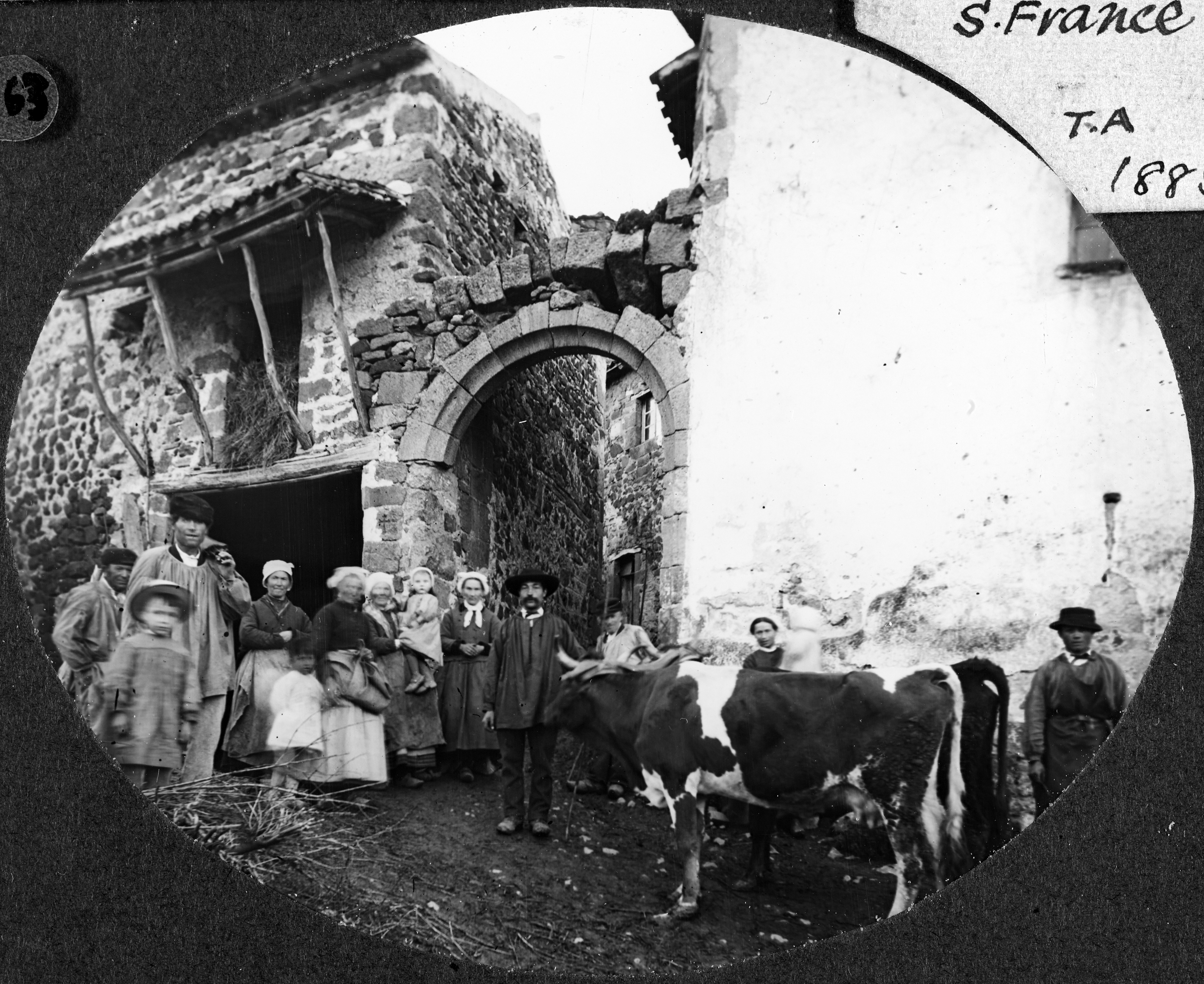
Buron in 1885

Yronde-et-Buron (French pronunciation: [iʁɔ̃d e byʁɔ̃]; Occitan: Ironda e Buron) is a commune in the Puy-de-Dôme department in Auvergne in central France.

== Population ==
Historical population
Year	Pop.	±% p.a.
1968	402	—
1975	437	+1.20%
1982	487	+1.56%
1990	543	+1.37%
1999	586	+0.85%
2007	583	−0.06%
2012	670	+2.82%
2017	648	−0.67%
2023	642	−0.15%
Source: INSEE

== See also ==
- Communes of the Puy-de-Dôme department
