= Count of Boulogne =

Historical title in the Kingdom of France

Coat of arms of the county of Boulogne

Count of Boulogne was a historical title in the Kingdom of France. The city of Boulogne-sur-Mer became the centre of the County of Boulogne during the ninth century. Little is known of the early counts, but the first holder of the title is recorded in the 11th century.

Eustace II of Boulogne accompanied William I of England (the Conqueror) during the Norman Conquest in 1066 and fought on his side at the Battle of Hastings. His son, Eustace III, was a major participant in the First Crusade with his younger brothers: Geoffrey and Baldwin (who later became King of Jerusalem). After Baldwin's death the throne was offered to Eustace, who was reluctant and declined; the throne was then offered to Geoffrey. Afonso (also King of Portugal) from Dammartin became Count of Boulogne from 1235 to 1253.

Count Renaud of Boulogne obtained the title by abducting and marrying Countess Ida in 1190 and later gained title to Dammartin and Aumale. An early friend of King Philip II Augustus, he turned against the king by joining the forces of the Holy Roman Empire at the Battle of Bouvines in 1214 where he was defeated, captured, imprisoned and subsequently committed suicide.

Boulogne passed under Capetian control in 1223 when Philip II's son Philip Hurepel became count jure uxoris upon his marriage to Matilda II. Hurepel revolted against Blanche of Castile when Louis VIII of France died in 1226. When Philip Hurepel died in 1235, Matilda continued to reign until 1238 when she was married to Alphonse, second son of King Alfonso II of Portugal, and younger brother of King Sancho II of Portugal. Having succeeded his brother as Afonso III of Portugal in 1248, he renounced his title of Count of Boulogne and divorced Matilda in 1253 due to her barrenness in favour of Beatrice of Castile. After Matilda's death, the county was granted to Adelaide of Brabant, wife of William III of Auvergne.

Boulogne was attacked and besieged a number of times during the Hundred Years' War and repeatedly passed between English and French rule. In 1477, the county was directly incorporated into the French crown lands and Bertrand VI of La Tour was granted the County of Lauragais by King Louis XI instead. The county remained part of the royal domain from then on, except for a brief period where its main city Boulogne-sur-Mer was controlled by the English under Henry VIII.

== List of counts ==
=== Uncertain ===
- ?–921? : Erkenger

=== House of Flanders ===
Coat of arms of Flanders after about 1200

- 896–918: Baldwin I (also count of Flanders)
- 918–933: Adelolf (son)
- 933–964: Arnulf I (brother; also count of Flanders)
- 964–971: Arnulf II (nephew; son of Adelolf)
- 971–990: Arnulf III (son)
- 990–1025: Baldwin II (son)
- 1025–1049: Eustace I (son)
- 1049–1087: Eustace II (son)
- 1087–1125: Eustace III (son)
- 1125–1151: Matilda (daughter)

=== House of Blois ===
Coat of arms of Blois after about 1200

- 1125–1151: Stephen (husband; also count of Mortain, duke of Normandy and king of England)
- 1151–1153: Eustace IV (son; also Count of Mortain)
- 1153–1159: William I (brother; also count of Mortain and earl of Surrey)
- 1159–1170: Mary (sister; married Matthew of Alsace)

=== House of Alsace ===
House of Alsace coat of arms

- 1170–1173: Matthew
- 1173–1216: Ida (daughter)
  - 1181–1182: Gerard of Guelders (first husband)
  - 1183–1186: Berthold IV of Zähringen (second husband)
  - 1191–1216: Reginald I of Dammartin (third husband)

=== House of Dammartin ===
Dammartin coat of arms

- 1216–1259: Matilda of Dammartin (also countess of Mortain, Aumale and Dammartin)
  - 1223–1235: Philip Hurepel (also count of Clermont-en-Beauvaisis)
  - 1235–1253: Afonso (also king of Portugal)

=== House of Auvergne ===
Auvergne coat of arms

- 1262–1265: Adelaide (cousin; married William X of Auvergne)
- 1265–1277: Robert V of Auvergne (son; also Count of Auvergne)
- 1277–1277: William XI of Auvergne (son; also Count of Auvergne)
- 1277–1314: Robert VI of Auvergne (brother; also Count of Auvergne)
- 1314–1325: Robert VII of Auvergne (son; also Count of Auvergne)
- 1325–1332: William XII of Auvergne (son; also Count of Auvergne)
- 1332–1360: Joan I of Auvergne (daughter; also Countess of Auvergne); married:
  - 1338–1346: Philip of Burgundy
  - 1350–1360: John II of France

=== House of Burgundy ===
Burgundy coat of arms

- 1360–1361: Philip of Rouvres (son; also duke of Burgundy and count of Auvergne, Artois, and Burgundy)

=== House of Auvergne ===
- 1361–1386: John I of Auvergne (half-granduncle; also count of Auvergne)
- 1386–1404: John II of Auvergne (son; also count of Auvergne)
- 1404–1424: Joan II of Auvergne (daughter; also countess of Auvergne); married:
  - 1404–1416: John I of Berry (also duke of Berry)
  - 1416–1424: George (also count of Guînes)
- 1424–1437: Marie I of Auvergne (cousin; also countess of Auvergne)

=== House of La Tour d'Auvergne ===
La Tour d'Auvergne coat of arms

- 1437–1461: Bertrand V of La Tour (son; also count of Auvergne)
- 1461–1477: Bertrand VI of La Tour (son; also count of Auvergne)

In 1477, Bertrand II dealt with King Louis XI, exchanging the county of Boulogne with the county of Lauragais. Boulogne thus became part of the royal domain.

== See also ==
- Sieges of Boulogne (1544–1546)
