= Margaret of France =

Marguerite of France may refer to:

- Margaret of France, Queen of England and Hungary (1158 – 1197), queen consort of England and Hungary
- Margaret of Provence (1221–1295), queen of France as the wife of Louis IX of France
- Margaret of France (1254–1271), daughter of Louis IX of France, wife of John I, Duke of Brabant
- Margaret of France, Queen of England (1279 – 1318), queen consort of England, wife of Edward I of England
- Margaret of France (1288–1294), daughter of Philip IV of France
- Margaret I, Countess of Artois (1310–82), countess of Flanders, Artois and Burgundy, wife of Louis I of Flanders and mother of Louis II of Flanders
- Margaret of France (1347–1352), daughter of John II of France and Bonne of Bohemia
- Marguerite, bâtarde de France (1407–58), illegitimate daughter of Charles VI of France, married Jean de Belleville et de Montaigu
- Marguerite de Navarre (1492–1549 also called Margaret of Angoulême), elder sister of Francis I of France, married Henry II of Navarre
- Margaret of France, Duchess of Berry (Valois) (1523–74), daughter of Francis I of France and Claude of France, wife of Emmanuel Philibert, Duke of Savoy
- Margaret of Valois (1553–1615), daughter of Henry II of France, wife of Henry IV of France
