= Marguerite de Valois (disambiguation) =

Marguerite de Valois may refer to:

- Marguerite de Valois, wife of Henry IV of France, daughter of Henry II of France
- Marguerite de Navarre, also called Marguerite of Angoulême, sister of Francis I of France, wife of Henry II of Navarre
- Marguerite, bâtarde de France, illegitimate daughter of Charles VI of France
- Margaret of France, Duchess of Berry (1523–1574), sister of Henry II of France, daughter of Francis I of France
