= Jeanne d'Auvergne =

Jeanne d'Auvergne, also Joanna or Joan of Auvergne, is the name of:

- Joanna I, Countess of Auvergne (1326–1360), Queen Consort of France
- Joan II, Countess of Auvergne (1378–c. 1424), Duchesse de Berri
- Jeanne, Dauphine d'Auvergne (1414–1436), wife of Louis I, Count of Montpensier
