= Michel Pintoin =

French Monk cantor and chronicle writer

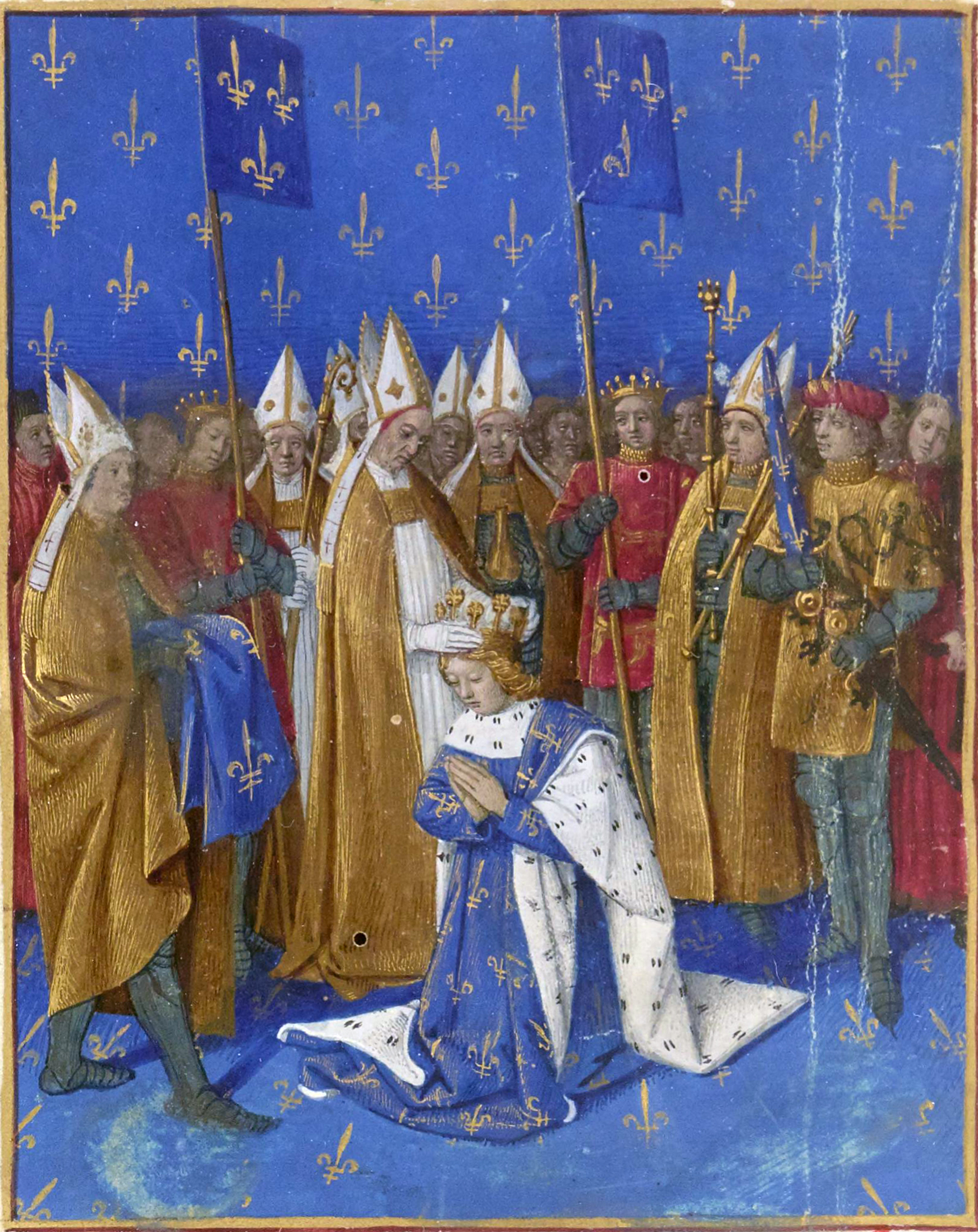
Michel Pinoit chronicled the reign of Charles VI of France, whose coronation is shown in this miniature painted by Jean Fouquet.

Michel Pintoin (c. 1350 – c. 1421), known as the Chronicler of Saint-Denis, the Monk of Saint-Denis or Religieux de Saint-Denis was a French monk, cantor, and chronicle writer believed to be the anonymous author of a history of the reign of Charles VI of France.

== The Monk of St Denis ==
Michel Pintoin was a monk and cantor at the Abbey of St-Denis. The abbey had a reputation for writing chronicles and the monks were considered the official chroniclers of the Valois Kings of France. They were given access to official documents. Pintoin has been identified as the monk who authored a chronicle of the reign of King Charles VI of France. Anonymous for many centuries, in 1976 the Monk was tentatively identified as Michel Pintoin, although scholars continue to refer to the author as the Monk or the Religieux, or the Chronicler of Saint-Denis.

Because he witnessed many of the events of the Hundred Years War, the Monk of Saint-Denis is considered a valuable chronicler of this period. His history of the reign of Charles VI, titled Chronique de Religieux de Saint-Denys, contenant le regne de Charles VI de 1380 a 1422, encompasses the king's full reign in six volumes. Originally written in Latin, the work was translated to French in six volumes by L. Bellaguet between 1839 and 1852.

Pintoin, considered to be the most well-informed of the chroniclers in the court of Charles VI, wrote about events such as the English Peasants' Revolt in 1381 and the Harelle and Maillotins revolts in France during the same period. He also recorded Charles VI's reinstatement of the Marmousets, the choice of Olivier V de Clisson as royal constable, and the disastrous Bal des Ardents in 1393.

== Style ==
Because he was cleric, the Monk wrote about the Hundred Years War from a perspective that differed from secular or "chivalric" chroniclers such as Jean Froissart. Writing in Latin, his tone was frequently similar to a sermon. He sympathized with the commoners during the war and chastised the knights, who he believed behaved as poorly as common soldiers, to the point that they even caused harm. His opinion of knightly valour is summed up in this passage:

Knights without courage, you who take pride in your armour plate and plumed helmets, you who glory in looting....you who boasted with so much arrogance about the feats of valour of your ancestors, now you have become the laughingstock of the English and the butt of foreign nations.

Of the French defeat at the Battle of Agincourt in 1415, he wrote that it was caused by the arrogance of the French knights, who charged the English, with the result that "The nobility of France was captured and ransomed like a vile herd of slaves, or else it was slaughtered by an obscure soldiery".

== Influence ==
20th-century historians have determined that Pintoin was responsible for the vilification of Queen consort Isabeau of Bavaria that has persisted since the time of his writing. A passage in his chronicle suggests she was the lover of her brother-in-law Louis I, Duke of Orléans, an allegation perpetuated in other chronicles and writing of the early 15th century. Historian Rachel Gibbons believes Pintoin's writing may have been pro-Burgundian propaganda; Tracy Adams writes that Pintoin's allegation of an incestuous union with the Duke of Orléans led her detractors not only to believe but to fabricate additional untruths about the queen consort.

== Sources ==
- Adams, Tracy (2010). The Life and Afterlife of Isabeau of Bavaria. Johns Hopkins University Press. ISBN 978-0-8018-9625-5.
- Cohn, Samuel (2006). Lust for Liberty: The Politics of Social Revolt in Medieval Europe, 1200–1425 Italy, France, and Flanders. Harvard University Press. ISBN 978-0-674-02162-4.
- Curry, Anne (2000). The Battle of Agincourt: Sources and Interpretations. Boydell Press. ISBN 978-0-85115-802-0.
- Gibbons, Rachel (1996). "Isabeau of Bavaria, Queen of France (1385-1422). The Creation of a Historical Villainess". Transactions of the Royal Historical Society. 6: 51–73. doi:10.2307/3679229. JSTOR 3679229.
- Gibbons, Rachel (2014). "'The Limbs Fail when the Head is Removed': Reactions of the Body Politic of France to the Madness of Charles VI (1380-1422)". In McGlynn, S.; Woodacre, E. (eds.). The Image and Perception of Monarchy in Medieval and Early Modern Europe. Cambridge Scholars Publishing. ISBN 978-1-4438-6852-5.
- Henneman, John Bell (1996). Olivier de Clisson and Political Society in France under Charles V and Charles VI. University of Pennsylvania Press. ISBN 978-0-8122-3353-7.
- Le Bruesque, Georges (2004). "Chronicling the Hundred Years War in Burgundy and France in the Fifteenth Century". In Saunders, Corinne; et al. (eds.). Writing War: Medieval Literary Responses to Warfare. D.S Brewer. ISBN 978-0-85991-843-5.
- Meron, Theodor (1993). Henry's Wars and Shakespeare's Laws: Perspectives on the Law of War in the Later Middle Ages. Clarendon Press. ISBN 978-0-19-825811-7.
- Taylor, Craig (2019). A Virtuous Knight: Defending Marshal Boucicaut (Jean II Le Meingre, 1366-1421). York Medieval Press. ISBN 978-1-903153-91-8.
- Veenstra, Jan R.; Pignon, Laurens (1997). Magic and Divination at the Courts of Burgundy and France. Brill. ISBN 978-90-04-10925-4.
