= Odette de Champdivers =

Mistress of Charles VI of France

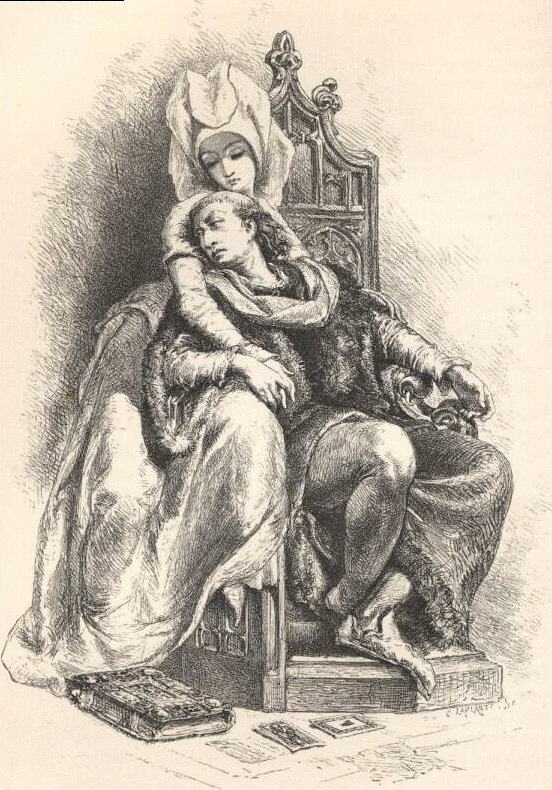
- Odette and Charles VI by François Guizot, circa 1875.
- Born: circa 1390
- Died: circa 1425
- Known for: Mistress of Charles VI of France
- Children: Marguerite de Valois

Odette de Champdivers (French pronunciation: [ɔdɛt də ʃɑ̃divɛʁ]. Also known as Oudine or Odinette; c. 1390 – c. 1425) was the chief mistress of Charles VI of France (the Mad). She was called la petite reine ("the little queen") by Charles and contemporaries.

According to Georges Bordonove, "Odette was the daughter of a maître d'hôtel (butler) of the King's Household, certain Guyot de Champdivers", who in fact was her brother. The messages of Père Anselme established her as a daughter of Odin or Oudin de Champdivers, who around 1387 was equerry stableman (Latin: marescallus equorum) at the court of King Charles VI.

She features in the novel Isabel de Bavière (1835) by Alexandre Dumas.

== Life ==
=== Family ===
Odette's family took their name after a fief that belonged to them, located near Dole and Saint-Jean-de-Losne in Burgundy. Rousset, in his study of the Municipalities of Jura stated that the old house of Champdivers probably descended from a younger branch of the House of Lorraine. It was also noted that the Lords of Champdivers had existed since 1160. On 20 April 1154, the name is mentioned in a bull of Pope Urban IV. In the Middle Ages, the Champdivers were vassals of the Dukes of Burgundy, and they lived in a mansion that was destroyed in 1477 by King Louis XI.

One of Odette's siblings was Henry de Champdivers, who married Joan of Toulongeon, widow of Tristan de Montholon—commander of the cavalry of the Dukes of Brabant and Burgundy on 25 October 1415 at the Battle of Agincourt, where he was killed— and sister of two marshals of Burgundy and an equerry of a French one Grand Squire of France. It is also known that Henry was knighted and in 1394 followed Duke Philip II the Bold during his trip to Brittany.

Guyot de Champdivers, another of her brothers, is mentioned in September 1391 in the royal accounts as one of the pages and squires who served in the household of Queen Isabeau of Bavaria. In 1407, Guyot de Champdivers reappears as a squire baker of the Duke of Burgundy with a pension of 200 pounds. The same Guyot (or Guillaume) de Champdivers therefore remained a staunch partisan of both Burgundian Dukes, John the Fearless and later Philip III the Good. He served these two princes as an adviser of the King and the Duke in the most important cases including approximately between 1413 and 1425.

=== Royal Mistress (1407–1422) ===
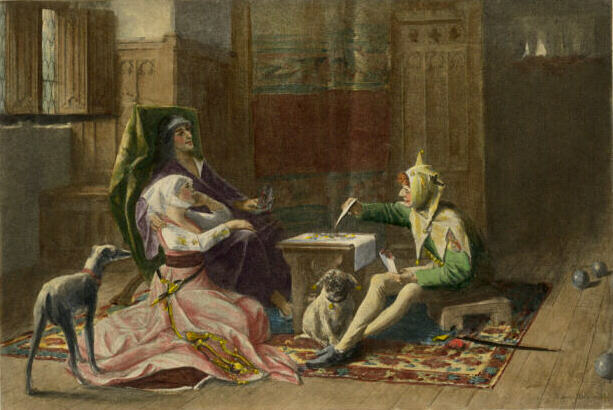
Charles VI of France and Odette

Although her family was Burgundian (i.e., supporters of the Duke of Burgundy), in early 1407 the seventeen-year-old Odette became the mistress of King Charles VI after the death of his brother Louis I, Duke of Orléans, Burgundy's rival.

Odette and Charles VI had only one daughter together, called Marguerite, who was born by the end of 1407.

Called la petite reine – "the little queen" – by Charles's court, Odette was described as a lively, beautiful young woman with a gentle disposition. Apparently she loved and cared for her unhappy sovereign with the utmost patience and devotion. She is credited with introducing playing cards into France, "for the amusement of [Charles VI] during his paroxysms of insanity".

According to some authors, Odette wore the clothes of the Queen in the royal bed each night, and Charles did not notice the substitution. Honoré de Balzac refers to her selflessness in one of his earlier novels, La Dernière fée:

So Abel was like the King Charles VI, that the little queen Odette de Champdivers consoled him while his Queen Isabeau danced with the Duke of Orléans in the palace where her husband was suffering.

During the almost fifteen years of their relationship, the King gave Odette rich gifts as a reward for her dedication to him; she also received two fine manors in Créteil and Bagnolet (the latter probably located in Malassis), and the estate of Belleville in Poitou.

Odette was at the King's side on his deathbed (21 October 1422); it is said that the last words of Charles VI were her name: "Odette, Odette". Queen Isabeau was absent from her husband's funeral.

=== After the death of King Charles VI (1422–1425) ===
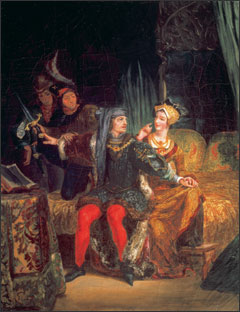
Charles and Odette by Eugène Delacroix

In 1423 Odette took refuge in Saint-Jean-de-Losne. The pension given to her from the royal treasure by the King was no longer paid; for this, in October and December of that year, Odette received some monetary help from Duke Philip III the Good. After the King's death, the royal treasure was taken by the English, and in consequence, Odette and her teenage daughter were reduced to poverty.

Odette took refuge in her homeland, under the protection of the Duke of Burgundy. In April 1424 she lived in the hotel of La Croix de Fer in Dijon. Étienne Chariot, native of Bourbonnais and monk in the convent of Beuvray-lès-Autun, visited Dijon at that time. The "little queen" (a nickname by which she was called by all) sent his squire, a son of Jean Trestelet, from Saint-Jean-de-Losne, with a message to the monk, who visited and talked with her. This monk Étienne was an envoy of the Dauphin Charles, with orders to spy on the movements of Duke Philip III.

Through the monk Étienne, Odette could warn the Dauphin about the imminent massacre of his supporters in Lyon by Burgundian and English forces. As soon as he learned this, the Dauphin sent instructions to the seneschal in Lyon to avoid the planned attack. Soon after, the monk received orders from the Dauphin: the "little queen" must be taken to Châlons during Holy Week, probably for her own safety.

However, monk Étienne was captured by the Burgundians and forced to talk. Odette and her daughter were called to court; the former royal mistress was interrogated with a certain solemnity at the request of the chancellor Rolin in the presence of the High Council of the Duke. Odette defended herself and her daughter with great skill and determination.

Odette de Champdivers disappears from records after 6 September 1424. There is some indication that she died in great poverty. She probably died in the Dauphiné in 1425, actually in poverty.

A breed of French rose has been named for her. Its color is pink with white spots.

== See also ==
- French royal mistresses

== Sources ==
- Hamel, Frank. The Lady of Beauty (Agnes Sorel). London: Chapman and Hall, 1912. ASIN: B00085ACUA.
- Hare, Augustus John Cuthbert. Days Near Paris. New York: George Routledge and Sons, 1888. ASIN: B001NSNLRC.
- Hoefer, Jean Chrétien Ferdinand. Nouvelle biographie générale depuis les temps les plus reculés jusqu'à nos jours, avec les renseignements bibliographiques et l'indication des sources à consulter. Paris: Firmin Didot Frères, Fils et Cie, 1863.
- Marchandisse, Alain; Kupper, Jean-Louis, eds. (2003). A l'ombre du pouvoir: les entourages princiers au Moyen Age (in French). Librairie Droz.
- Pardoe, Julia. The Court and Reign of Francis the First, King of France]. Philadelphia: Lea and Blanchard Publishing, 1849.
