= Charles VI of France =

King of France from 1380 to 1422

Charles VI
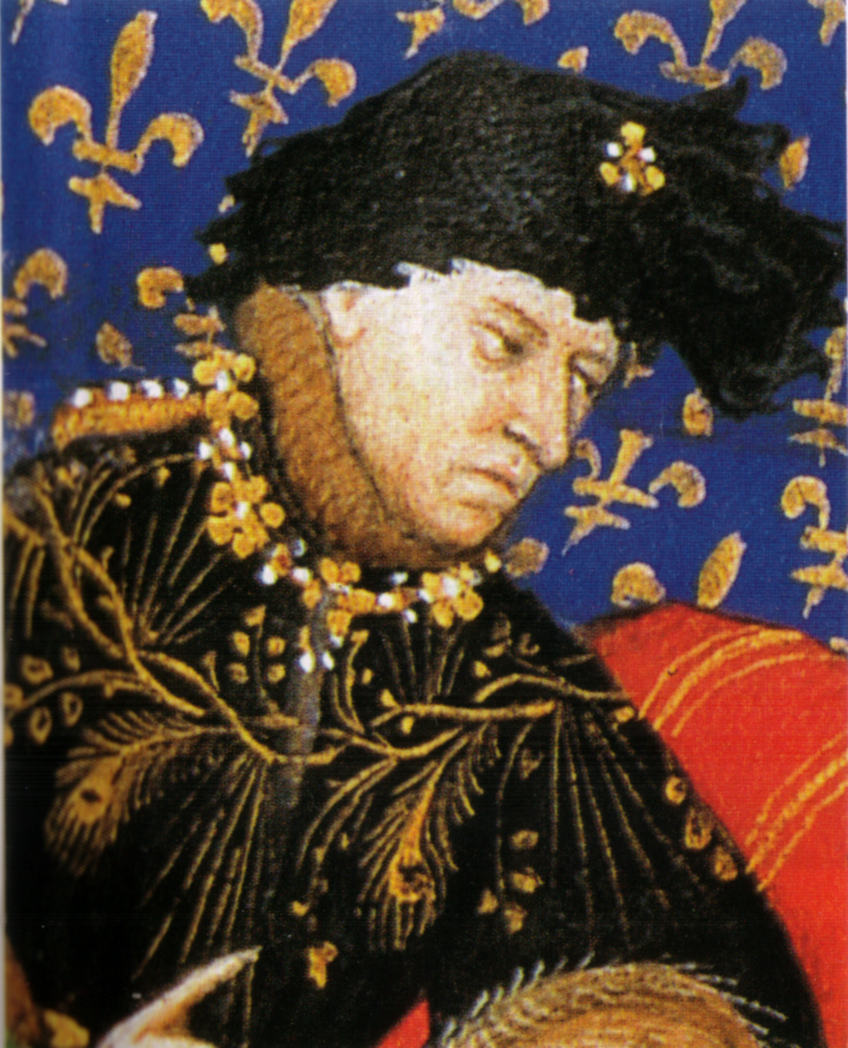
- Charles VI in the Dialogues of Pierre Salmon (1415)

King of France
- Reign: 16 September 1380 – 21 October 1422
- Coronation: 4 November 1380
- Predecessor: Charles V
- Successor: Charles VII or Henry VI (disputed)
- Regents: See: Philip II, Duke of Burgundy; John, Duke of Berry; Louis I, Duke of Anjou; Louis II, Duke of Bourbon; Louis I, Duke of Orléans; John I, Duke of Burgundy; Henry V, King of England; Isabeau, Queen of France
- Born: 3 December 1368; Paris, Kingdom of France
- Died: 21 October 1422 (aged 53); Paris, Kingdom of France
- Burial: 11 November 1422; Basilica of Saint-Denis
- Spouse: Isabeau of Bavaria (m. 1385)
- Issue: Charles, Dauphin of France; Jeanne of France; Isabella, Queen of England; Joan, Duchess of Brittany; Charles, Dauphin of France; Marie, Prioress of Poissy; Michelle, Duchess of Burgundy; Louis, Duke of Guyenne; John, Duke of Touraine; Catherine, Queen of England; Charles VII, King of France; Philip of France; Marguerite, Lady of Belleville (ill.)
- House: Valois
- Father: Charles V of France
- Mother: Joanna of Bourbon

Charles VI (3 December 1368 – 21 October 1422), nicknamed the Beloved (French: le Bien-Aimé) and in the 19th century, the Mad (French: le Fol or le Fou), was King of France from 1380 until his death in 1422. He is known for his mental illness and psychotic episodes that plagued him throughout his life, including glass delusion.

Charles ascended the throne at age 11, his father Charles V leaving behind a favorable military situation, marked by the reconquest of most of the English possessions in France. Charles VI was placed under the regency of his uncles: Philip II, Duke of Burgundy; Louis I, Duke of Anjou; John, Duke of Berry; and Louis II, Duke of Bourbon. He decided in 1388, aged 20, to emancipate himself. In 1392, while leading a military expedition against the Duchy of Brittany, the king had his first attack of delirium, during which he attacked his own men in the forest of Le Mans. A few months later, following the Bal des Ardents (January 1393) where he narrowly escaped death from burning, Charles was again placed under the regency of his uncles, the Dukes of Berry and Burgundy.

From then on, and until his death, Charles alternated between periods of mental instability and lucidity. Power was held by his influential uncles and by his wife, Queen Isabeau. His younger brother, Louis I, Duke of Orléans, also aspired to the regency and saw his influence grow. The enmity between the Duke of Orléans and his cousin John the Fearless, successor of Philip the Bold as Duke of Burgundy, plunged France into the Armagnac–Burgundian Civil War of 1407–1435, during which the king found himself successively controlled by one or the other of the two parties.

In 1415, Charles's army was crushed by the English at the Battle of Agincourt. The king subsequently signed the Treaty of Troyes, which entirely disinherited his son, the Dauphin and future King Charles VII, in favour of Henry V of England. Henry was thus made regent and heir to the throne of France, and Charles' daughter Catherine married to Henry. However, Henry died shortly before Charles, which gave the House of Valois the chance to continue the fight against the House of Lancaster, leading to eventual Valois victory and the end of the Hundred Years' War in 1453. Charles was succeeded in law by his grandson (Henry V's son), the infant Henry VI of England, but Charles's own son was crowned first in Reims Cathedral in 1429 and was widely regarded even before his coronation as the true heir by the French people.

== Early life ==
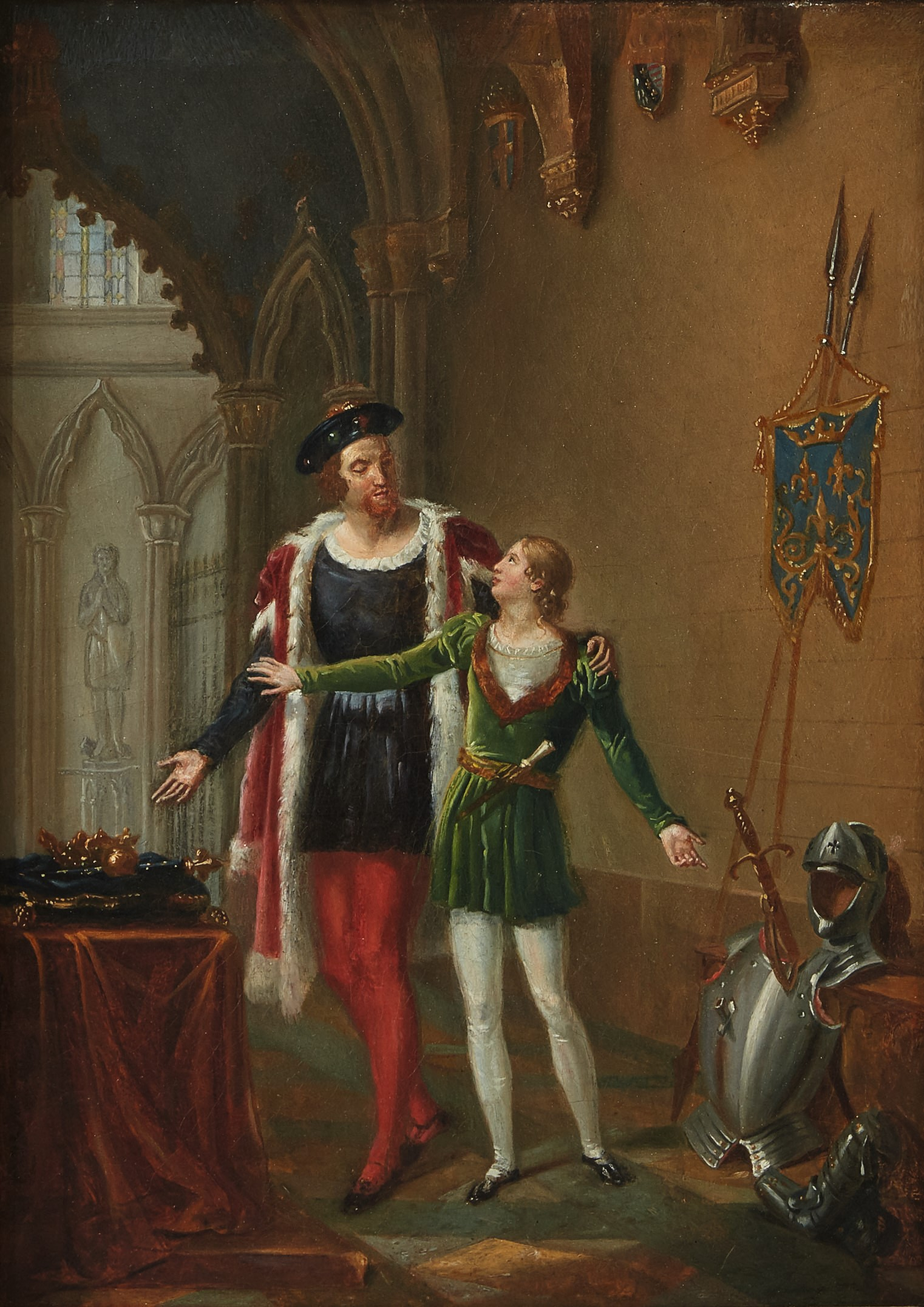
Dauphin Charles, with his father, King Charles V of France. Painted by Claude-Jean Besselièvre c. 1820.

Charles VI was born in Paris, in the royal residence of the Hôtel Saint-Pol, on 3 December 1368, the son of King Charles V of the House of Valois and of Joanna of Bourbon. As the eldest son of the king, Charles was heir to the French throne and held the title Dauphin of France. By that time, the region of Dauphiné was under the effective French rule, but the Holy Roman Emperor Charles IV still considered it as part of the Kingdom of Burgundy (Arles) within the Holy Roman Empire, and thus an arrangement was made in 1378, by appointing the young French prince Charles as the imperial vicar of Burgundy, but only for his lifetime.

== King of France ==
=== Regency ===
At his father's death on 16 September 1380, Charles inherited the throne of France. His coronation took place on 4 November at Reims Cathedral. Charles was only eleven years old when he was crowned king. During his minority, France was ruled by Charles's uncles as regents. Although the royal age of majority was 14 (the "age of accountability" under Roman Catholic canon law), Charles was 21 when he formally terminated the regency.

The regents were Philip the Bold, Duke of Burgundy, Louis I, Duke of Anjou, and John, Duke of Berry – all brothers of Charles V – along with Louis II, Duke of Bourbon, Charles VI's maternal uncle. Philip took the dominant role during the regency. Louis of Anjou was fighting for his claim to the Kingdom of Naples after 1382, dying in 1384; John of Berry was concerned only with his interests in Languedoc, and not particularly enthusiastic with royal politics; and Louis of Bourbon was a largely unimportant figure, owing to his eccentric personality (showing signs of mental illness) and comparatively low status (he was from a junior branch of the royal bloodline).

During the regency, the financial resources of the kingdom, painstakingly built up by Charles V, were squandered for the personal profit of the dukes, whose interests were frequently divergent or even opposing. The new royal administration took steps to centralize power by usurping control of political offices and reimposing several unpopular taxes. The latter policy represented a reversal of the deathbed decision by Charles V to repeal them, and led to tax revolts, known as the Harelle. The dukes also engaged in state capture; for instance, the Battle of Roosebeke (1382) was fought solely for Philip's benefit.

Charles VI finally stripped his corrupt uncles of their positions in 1388. To guide his rule, he restored to office the highly competent advisors of Charles V, known as the Marmousets, who ushered in a new period of high esteem for the crown. Charles VI was initially referred to as Charles the Beloved by his subjects.

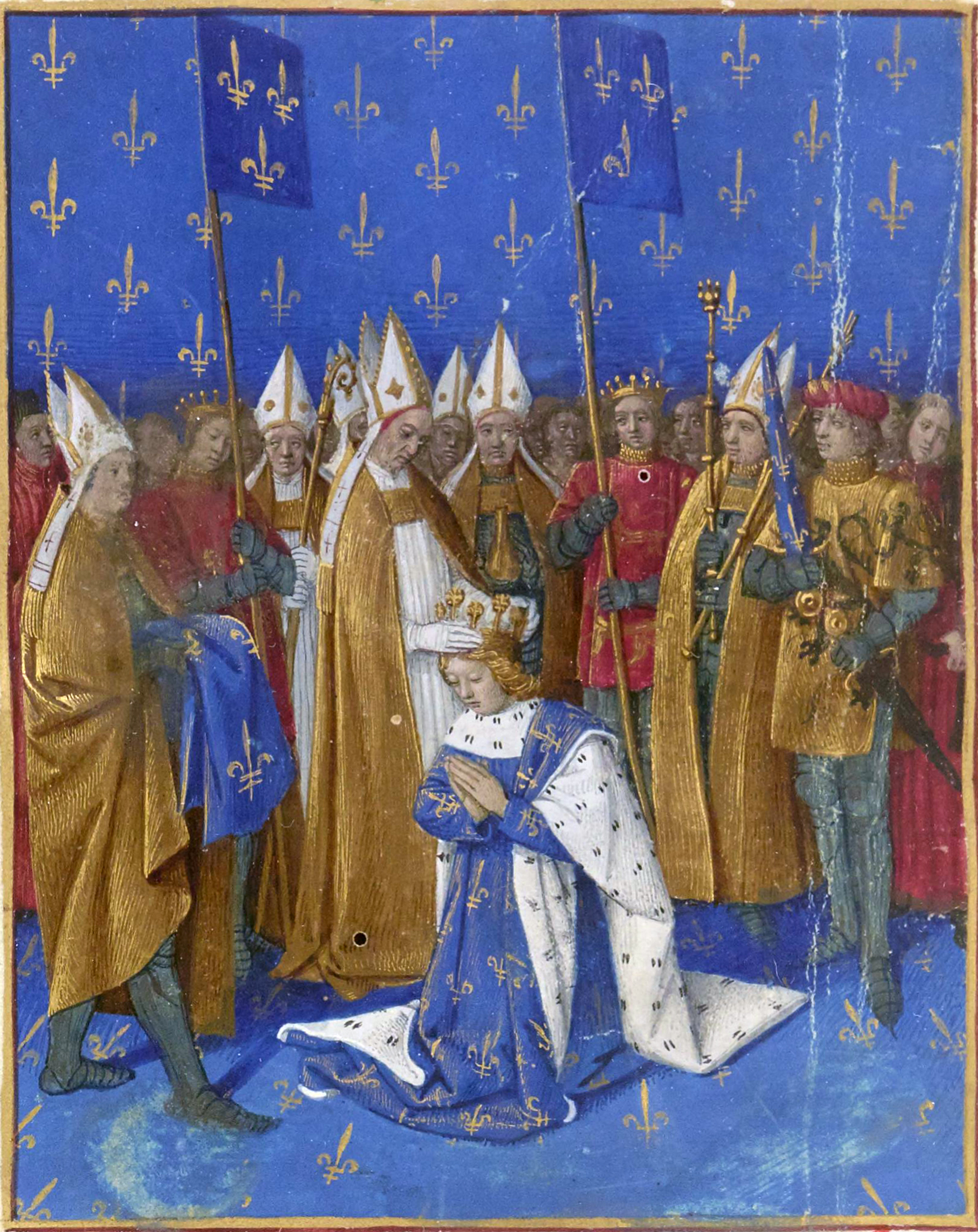
The coronation of Charles VI at Reims Cathedral

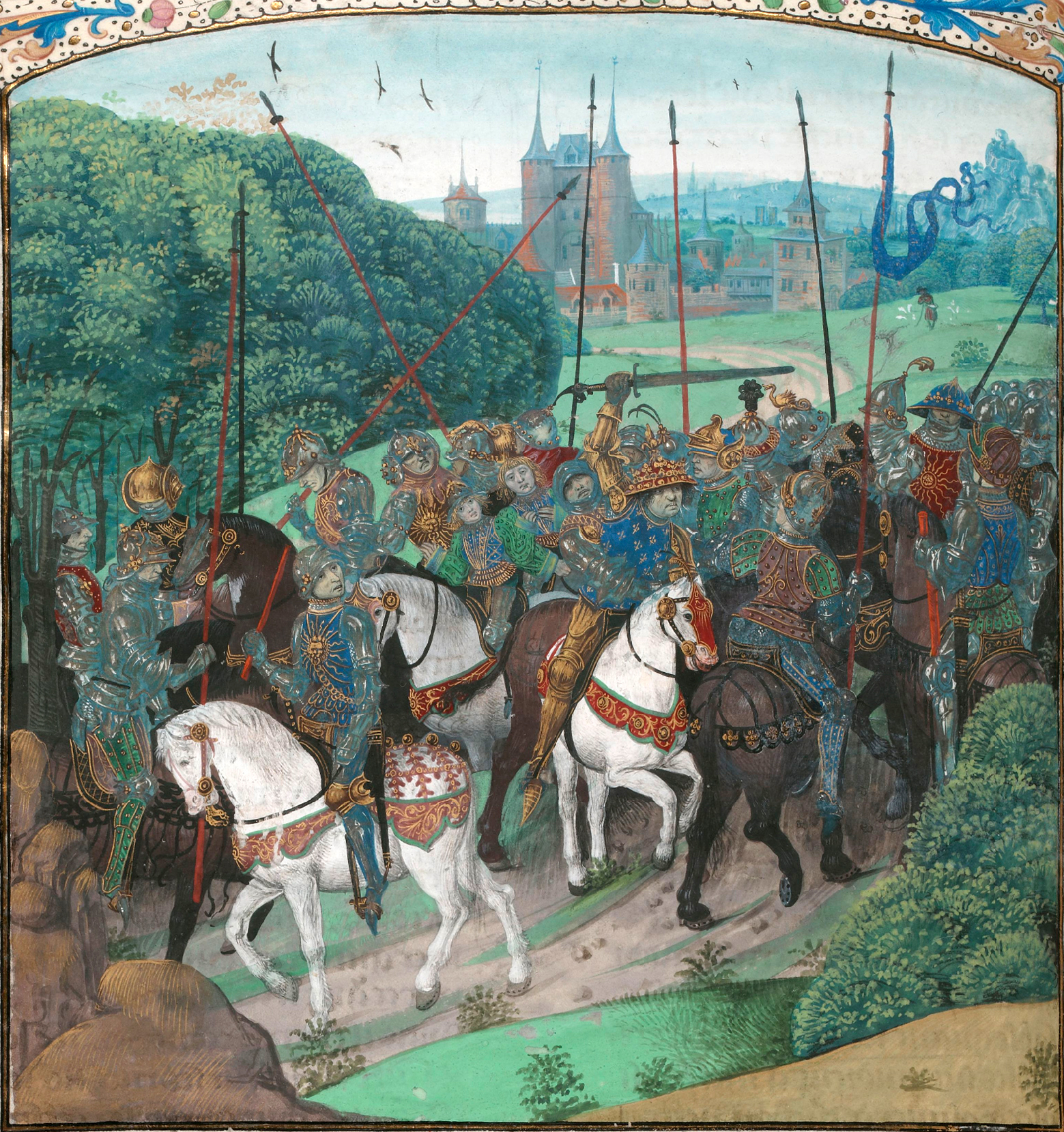
Charles seized by madness in the forest near Le Mans in 1392, shown in a miniature from Froissart's Chronicles

=== Mental illness ===
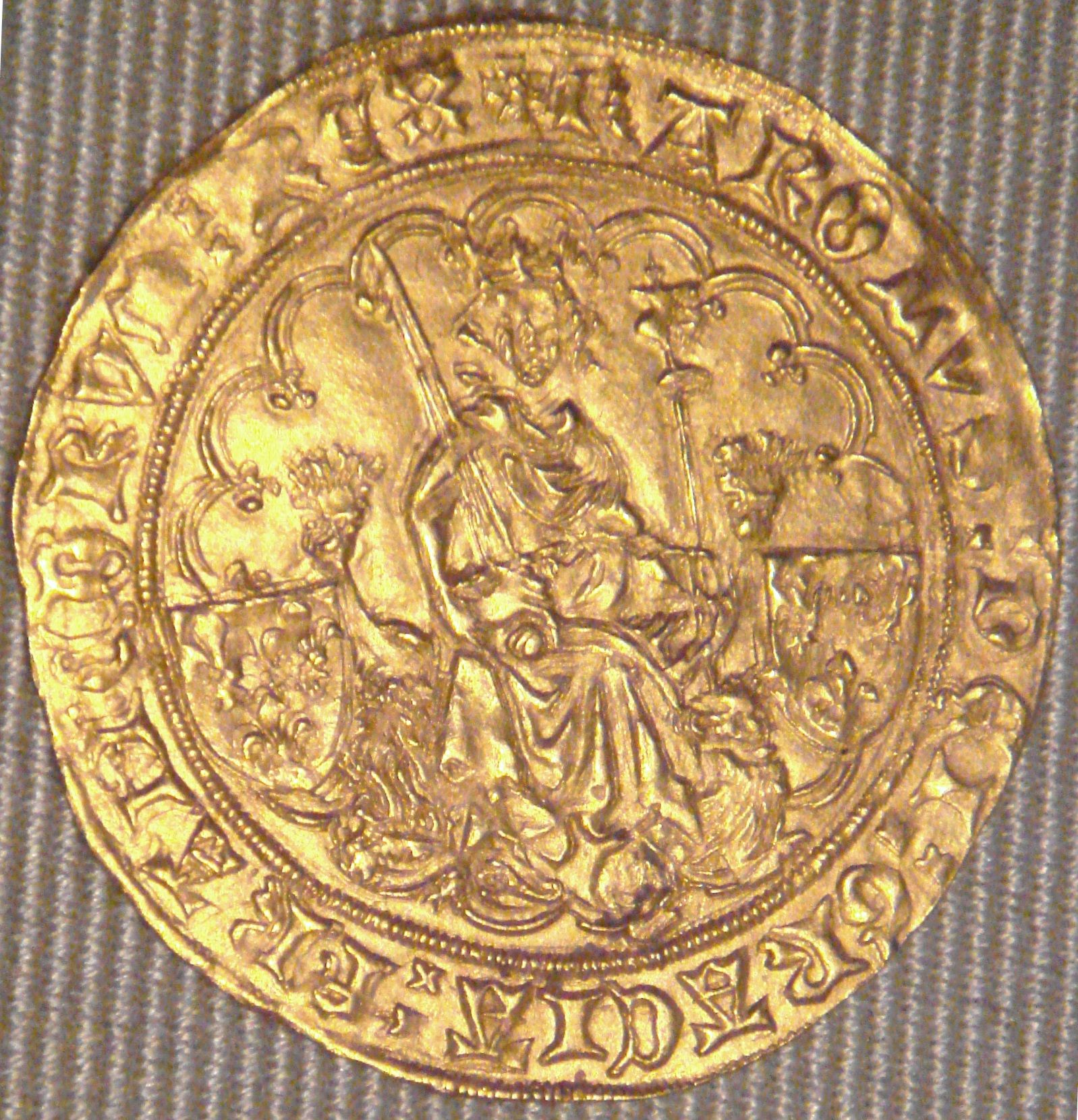
A coin of Charles VI, a "double d'or", minted in La Rochelle in 1420

Charles VI's early successes with the Marmousets as his counselors quickly dissipated as a result of the bouts of psychosis he experienced from his mid-twenties. Mental illness may have been passed on for several generations through his mother, Joanna of Bourbon, with familial schizophrenia syndrome that led to her. The true cause of his illness is not known. Since the development of the modern psychiatry in the late 19th century, it has generally been assumed that Charles had suffered from schizophrenia, but alternative theories have over the years included manic-depressive psychosis, familial sarcoidosis causing neurosarcoidosis, severe arsenic poisoning, typhus-induced encephalopathy, porphyria, and others. Typhus could explain his skin plaque or rashes along with his fits of delirium. Although still called by his subjects Charles the Beloved, he became known also as Charles the Mad.

Charles's first known episode occurred in 1392 when his friend and advisor, Olivier V de Clisson, was the victim of an attempted murder. Although Clisson survived, the king was determined to punish the would-be assassin, Pierre de Craon, who had taken refuge in Brittany. John IV, Duke of Brittany, was unwilling to hand him over, so Charles prepared a military expedition.

Contemporaries reported that Charles appeared to be in a "fever" to begin the campaign and was disconnected in his speech. He set off with an army on 1 July 1392. The progress of the army was slow, driving Charles into a frenzy of impatience. As the king and his escort were traveling through the forest near Le Mans on a hot August morning, a barefoot leper dressed in rags rushed up to the king's horse and grabbed his bridle. "Ride no further, noble King!" he yelled: "Turn back! You are betrayed!" The king's escorts beat the man back but did not arrest him, and he followed the procession for half an hour, repeating his cries.

After the company emerged from the forest at noon, a page who was drowsy from the sun dropped the king's lance, which clanged loudly against a steel helmet carried by another page. Charles shuddered, drew his sword and yelled, "Forward against the traitors! They wish to deliver me to the enemy!" The king then drew his sword, spurred his mount, and attacked his own knights before one of his chamberlains and a group of soldiers were able to grab him from his mount and lay him on the ground. He lay still and did not react, but then fell into a coma; as a temporary measure, he was taken to the castle of Creil, where it was hoped that good air and pleasant surroundings might bring him to his senses. The king had killed a knight known as "the Bastard of Polignac" and several other men during the attack.

Periods of mental illness continued throughout Charles's life. During one episode in 1393, he could not remember his name and did not know he was king. When his wife came to visit, he asked his servants who she was and ordered them to help her so he would be left alone. During another episode in 1395–96, the king claimed he was Saint George and that his coat of arms was a lion with a sword thrust through it. At this time, he recognized all the officers of his household, but not his wife or children. At times, the king ran wildly through the corridors of the Hôtel Saint-Pol, and to keep him inside, the entrances were walled up. In 1405, he refused to bathe or change his clothes for five months.

Pierre Salmon gives a copy of his Dialogues to King Charles VI, from manuscript BnF fr. 23279

Charles's later psychotic episodes were not described in detail, perhaps because of the similarity of his behavior and delusions. Pope Pius II, who was born during the reign of Charles VI, wrote in his Commentaries that there were times when Charles thought that he was made of glass, and thus tried to protect himself in various ways so that he would not break. He reportedly had iron rods sewn into his clothes so that he would not shatter if he came into contact with another person. This condition has come to be known as glass delusion.

Charles's secretary, Pierre Salmon, spent considerable time in discussion with the king during his periods of intermittent psychosis. Hoping to find a remedy for the king's illness, stabilize the kingdom's volatile political situation, and safeguard his own position, Salmon oversaw the production of two distinct, richly illuminated versions of his Dialogues, a set of guidebooks to good kingship.

=== Bal des Ardents ===
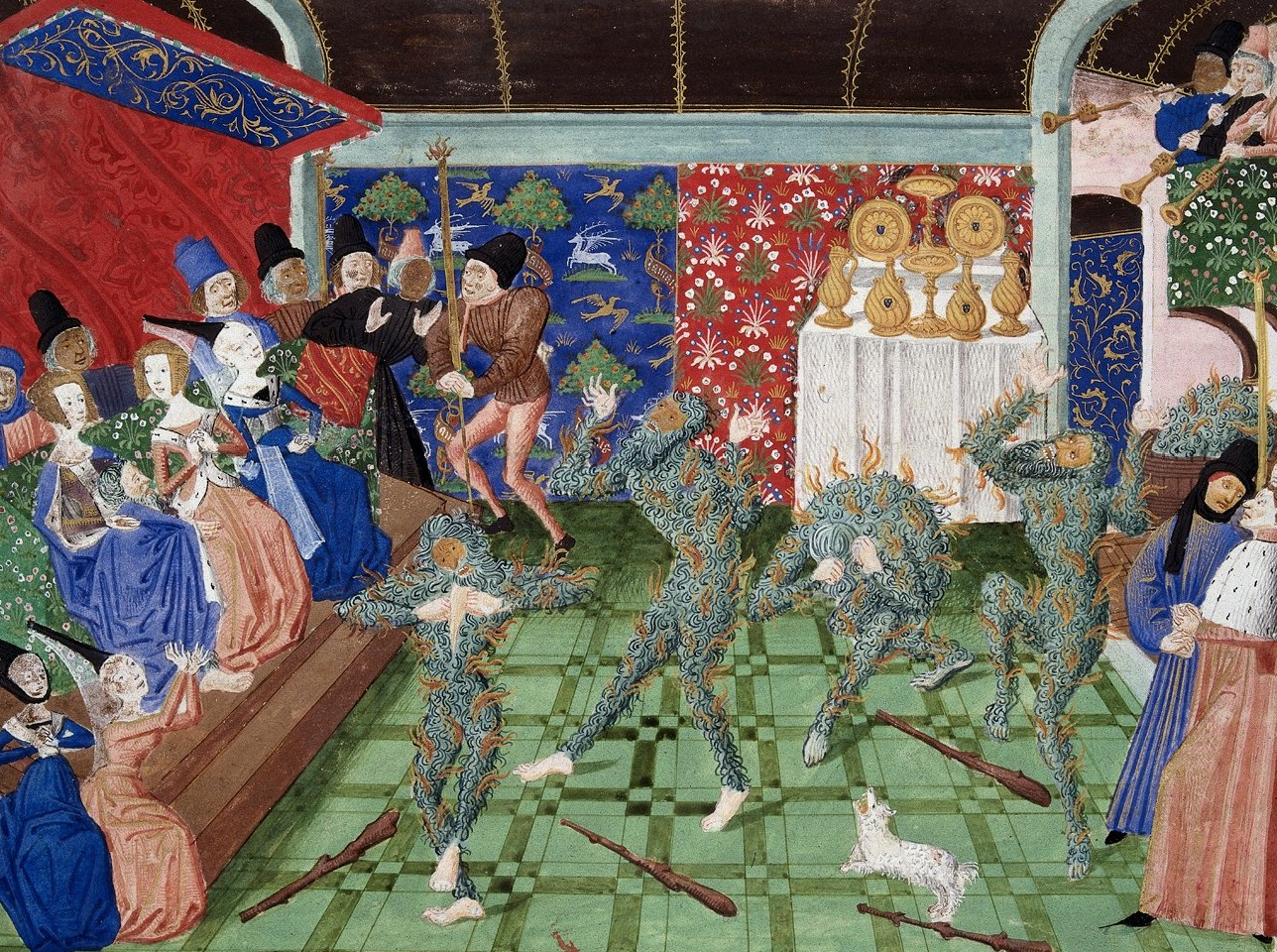
The Bal des Ardents, miniature of 1450–80 showing the dancers' costumes on fire

On 29 January 1393, a masked ball, which later became known as the Bal des Ardents ("Ball of the Burning Men"), was organized by Queen Isabeau of Bavaria to celebrate the wedding of one of her ladies-in-waiting at the Hôtel Saint-Pol. At the suggestion of Huguet de Guisay, the king and four other lords dressed up as wild men and performed a dance while dressed "in costumes of linen cloth sewn onto their bodies and soaked in resinous wax or pitch to hold a covering of frazzled hemp, so that they appeared shaggy & hairy from head to foot."

At the suggestion of one Yvain de Foix, the king commanded that the torch-bearers were to stand at the side of the room. Nonetheless, the king's younger brother Louis I, Duke of Orléans, who had arrived late, approached with a lighted torch to discover the identity of the dancers, and accidentally set one of them on fire. There was panic as the flames spread. The Duchess of Berry threw the train of her gown over the king to protect him. Several knights who tried to put out the flames were severely burned. Four of the dancers perished: Charles de Poitiers, son of the Count of Valentinois; Huguet de Guisay; Yvain de Foix; and the Count of Joigny. Another – Jean, son of the Lord of Nantouillet – saved himself by jumping into a dishwater tub.

=== Expulsion of the Jews, 1394 ===
On 17 September 1394, Charles suddenly published an ordinance in which he declared, in substance, that for a long time he had been taking note of the many complaints provoked by the excesses and misdemeanors of the Jews against Christians, and that the prosecutors had made several investigations and discovered that the Jews broke the agreement with the king on many occasions. Therefore, the king decreed, as an irrevocable law and statute, that no Jew would dwell in his domains ("Ordonnances", vii. 675). According to the Monk of St. Denis, the king signed this decree at the insistence of Isabeau ("Chron. de Charles VI." ii. 119). The decree was not immediately enforced, a respite being granted to the Jews so that they have enough time to sell their property and pay their debts. Those indebted to them were enjoined to redeem their obligations within a set time; otherwise their pledges held in pawn were to be sold by the Jews. The provost was to escort the Jews to the frontier of the kingdom. Subsequently, the king released Christians from their debts.

=== Struggles for power ===
With Charles mentally ill, from 1393 his wife Isabeau presided over a regency council, on which sat the grandees of the kingdom. Philip the Bold, who acted as regent during the king's minority (from 1380 to 1388), was initially a great influence on the queen. However, influence progressively shifted to Orléans, the king's brother, who was not only another contender for power, but, it was suspected, the queen's lover as well. Charles's other uncles were less influential during the regency, but John of Berry served as a mediator between the Orléans party (what would become the Armagnacs) and the Burgundy party (Bourguignons). The rivalry would increase bit by bit and eventually result in outright civil war.

The new regents dismissed the various advisers and officials Charles had appointed. On the death of Philip the Bold in April 1404, his son John the Fearless took over the political aims of his father, and the feud with Orléans escalated.

=== Wars with Burgundy and England ===
In 1407, Orléans was murdered in the rue Vieille du Temple in Paris. John the Fearless did not deny responsibility, claiming that Orléans was a tyrant who squandered money. Orléans' son Charles, the new Duke of Orléans, turned to his father-in-law, Bernard VII, Count of Armagnac, for support against John the Fearless. This resulted in the Armagnac–Burgundian Civil War, which lasted from 1407 until 1435, beyond Charles's reign, though the war with the English was still in progress.

With the English taking over much of France, John the Fearless sought to end the feud with the royal family by negotiating with the Dauphin Charles VII, the king's heir. They met at the bridge at Montereau on 10 September 1419, but during the meeting, John the Fearless was killed by Tanneguy III du Chastel, a follower of the Dauphin. His successor, Philip the Good, the new Duke of Burgundy, threw in his lot with the English.

=== English invasion and death ===
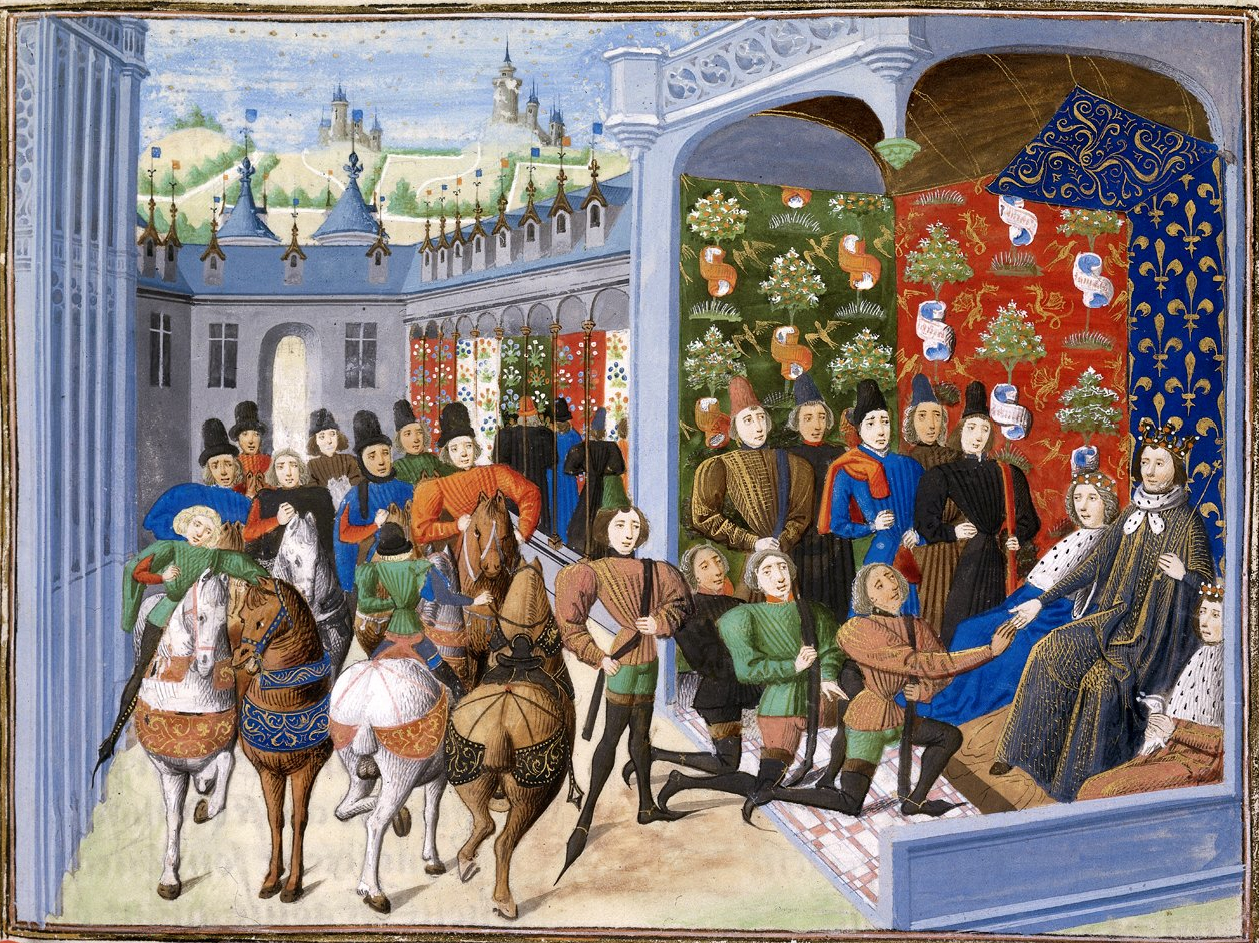
King Charles VI and Queen Isabeau of Bavaria at the Treaty of Troyes

Charles VI's reign was marked by the continuing conflict with the English, known as the Hundred Years' War. An early attempt at peace occurred in 1396 when his daughter, the almost seven-year-old Isabella of Valois, married the 29-year-old king Richard II of England. By 1415, however, the feud between the French royal family and its cadet branch of Burgundy led to chaos and anarchy throughout France, a situation that King Henry V of England was eager to take advantage of. Henry led an invasion that culminated in the defeat of the French army at the Battle of Agincourt on 25 October.

On 21 May 1420, Henry V and Charles VI signed the Treaty of Troyes, which named Henry as Charles's successor and stipulated that Henry's heirs would succeed him on the throne of France. It disinherited the Dauphin Charles, then only aged 17. The treaty also betrothed Charles VI's daughter, Catherine of Valois, to Henry. Disinheriting the Dauphin in favor of Henry was a blatant act against the interests of the French aristocracy, supported by the Duke of Burgundy. The Dauphin, who had declared himself regent for his father when the Duke of Burgundy invaded Paris and captured the king, had established a court at Bourges. By 1421, it was implied in Burgundian propaganda that the young Charles was illegitimate.

In the same time (1421), emperor Sigismund appointed a prominent nobleman Louis II of Chalon-Arlay as the imperial vicar of the Kingdom of Burgundy (Arles), in hope to restore some imperial authority over the region, including Dauphiné, Viennois and Provence, thus trying to suppress French interests and rising ambitions of powerful Burgundian duke Philip the Good, but the attempt failed.

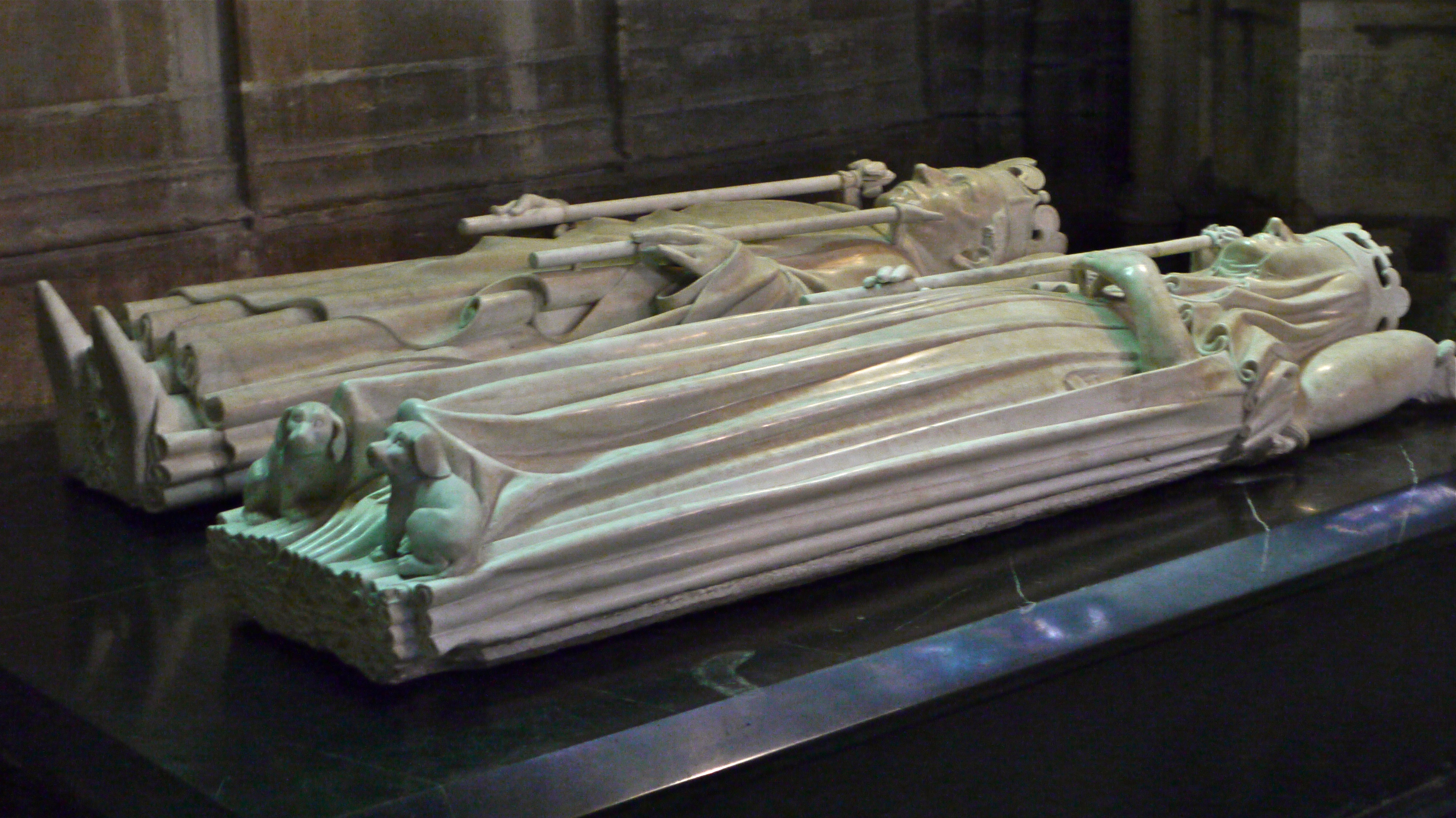
Tomb of King Charles VI and Queen Isabeau of Bavaria at the Saint-Denis Basilica

Charles VI died on 21 October 1422 in Paris, at the Hôtel Saint-Pol. He was interred in the Basilica of Saint-Denis, where his wife Isabeau was buried after her death in September 1435.

Henry V died just a few weeks before Charles, in August 1422, leaving an infant son, who became King Henry VI of England. Therefore, according to the Treaty of Troyes, with the death of Charles VI, Henry VI became King of France. His coronation as such was in Paris (held by the English since 1420) at the cathedral of Notre Dame de Paris on 16 December 1431.

The son disinherited by Charles VI, the Dauphin Charles, continued the fight to regain his kingdom. In 1429, Joan of Arc led his forces to victory against the English and took him to be crowned in Reims Cathedral as King Charles VII on 17 July 1429. He became known as "Charles the Victorious" and was able to restore the French line to the throne of France by finally defeating the English in 1453, ending the Hundred Years' War.

== Marriage and issue ==
Charles VI married Isabeau of Bavaria (c. 1370 – 24 September 1435) on 17 July 1385. They had:

Name	Birth	Death	Notes
Charles, Dauphin	25 September 1386	28 December 1386	Died young. First Dauphin.
Jeanne	14 June 1388	1390	Died young.
Isabella	9 November 1389	13 September 1409	Married (1) Richard II, King of England, in 1396. No issue. Married (2) Charles, Duke of Orléans, in 1406. Had issue.
Jeanne	24 January 1391	27 September 1433	Married John V, Duke of Brittany, in 1396. Had issue.
Charles, Dauphin	6 February 1392	13 January 1401	Died young. Second Dauphin. Engaged to Margaret of Burgundy after his birth.
Marie	22 August 1393	19 August 1438	Never married – became an abbess. No issue. Died of the Plague
Michelle	11 January 1395	8 July 1422	Married Philip the Good, Duke of Burgundy, in 1409. Had no surviving issue.
Louis, Dauphin	22 January 1397	18 December 1415	Married Margaret of Burgundy. No issue. Third Dauphin.
John, Dauphin	31 August 1398	5 April 1417	Married Jacqueline, Countess of Hainaut, in 1415. No issue. Fourth Dauphin.
Catherine	27 October 1401	3 January 1437	Married (1) Henry V, King of England, in 1420. Had issue. Married (?) (2) Owen Tudor. Had issue.
Charles VII of France	22 February 1403	21 July 1461	The fifth Dauphin became Charles VII, King of France, after his father's death. Married Marie of Anjou in 1422. Had issue.
Philip	10 November 1407	November 1407	Died young.

Charles had a mistress, Odette de Champdivers. They had:

- Marguerite, bâtarde de France (d. c. 1458).

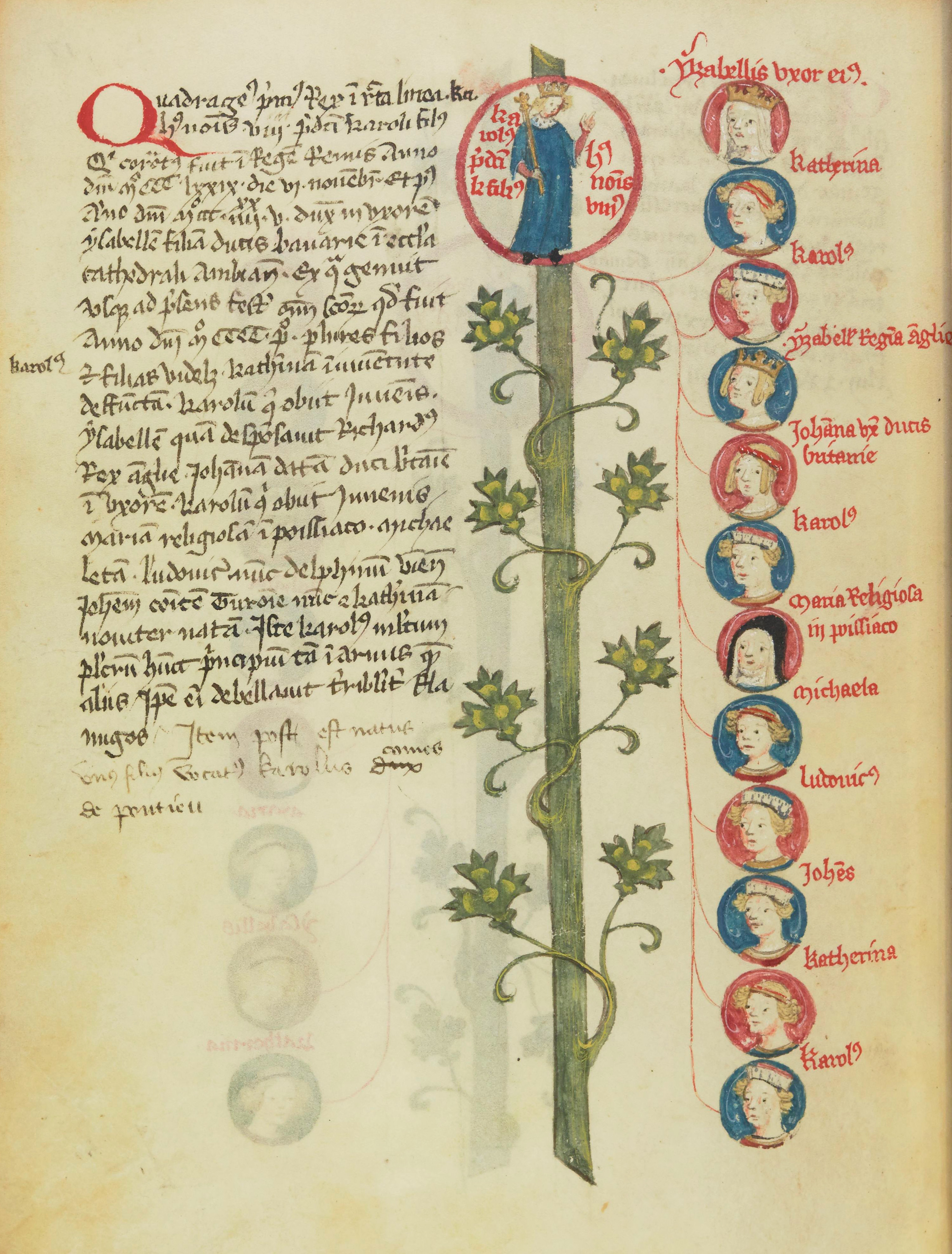
Charles VI Family

== Ancestry ==
Ancestors of Charles VI of France

8. Philip VI of France
4. John II of France
9. Joan of Burgundy
2. Charles V of France
10. John of Bohemia
5. Bonne of Luxembourg
11. Elizabeth of Bohemia
1. Charles VI of France
12. Louis I, Duke of Bourbon
6. Peter I, Duke of Bourbon
13. Mary of Avesnes
3. Joanna of Bourbon
14. Charles I, Count of Valois
7. Isabella of Valois
15. Mahaut of Châtillon

== Films and television ==
- Harcourt Williams in Henry V (1944)
- Paul Scofield in Henry V (1989)
- Lambert Wilson in The Hollow Crown (2012)
- Thibault de Montalembert in The King (2019)
- Alex Lawther in The Last Duel (2021)

== See also ==
- Henry of Marle (died 1418)
- Journal d'un bourgeois de Paris

== Sources ==
- Adams, Tracy (2014). Christine de Pizan and the Fight for France. Penn State University Press.
- Autrand, Françoise (1994). Charles V le Sage (in French). Paris: Fayard.
- Barker, Juliet (2009). Conquest: The English Kingdom of France, 1417-1450. Harvard University Press. ISBN 978-0-674-06560-4.
- Denieul-Cormier, Anne (1980). Wise and Foolish Kings: The First House of Valois, 1328–1498. Doubleday.
- Earenfight, Theresa (2013). Queenship in Medieval Europe. Palgrave Macmillan.
- Famiglietti, R.C. (1986). Royal Intrigue: Crisis at the Court of Charles VI, 1392–1420. AMS Press.
- —— (1992). Tales of the Marriage Bed from Medieval France (1300–1500). Picardy Press.
- Gaude-Ferragu, Murielle (2016). Queenship in Medieval France, 1300–1500. Translated by Krieger, Angela. Palgrave Macmillan.
- Gibbons, Rachel (1996). "The Piety of Isabeau of Bavaria, Queen of France, 1385-1422". In Dunn, Diana E.S. (ed.). Courts, Counties and the Capital in the Later Middle Ages. St Martin's Press. pp. 205–224. ISBN 978-0-7509-1149-8.
- Henneman, John Bell (1971). Royal taxation in Fourteenth Century France, The Development of War Financing 1322–1356. Princeton University Press. doi:10.1515/9781400869435. ISBN 978-1-4008-6943-5.
- Lebailly, Emilie (2005). "Le dauphin Louis, duc de Guyenne, et les arts précieux (1409–1415)". Bulletin Monumental (in French). 163, 4 (4): 357–374. doi:10.3406/bulmo.2005.1578.
- Roux, Simone (2009). Paris in the Middle Ages. Translated by McNamara, Jo Ann. University of Pennsylvania Press.
- Sumption, Jonathan (2009). The Hundred Years War. Vol. III: Divided Houses. University of Pennsylvania Press. ISBN 978-0-571-13897-5.
- Sumption, Jonathan (2015). The Hundred Years War. Vol. IV: Cursed Kings. Faber and Faber Ltd. ISBN 978-0-571-27456-7.
- Vaughan, Robert (2002) [1970]. Philip the Good: The Apogee of Burgundy (2nd ed.). Woodbridge: The Boydell Press. ISBN 978-0-85115-917-1.
- de Viriville, Vallet (1859). "Odette ou Odinette de Champdivers Était-elle fille d'un Marchand de Chevaux? Notes historiques sur ce personnage". Bibliothèque de l'École des chartes. Quatrième Série (in French). 5. Librairie Droz: 171–81.
- Wilson, Peter (2016). Heart of Europe: A History of the Holy Roman Empire. Cambridge: Harvard University Press. ISBN 978-0-674-91592-3.

Charles VI of France House of Valois Cadet branch of the Capetian dynasty Born: 3 December 1368 Died: 21 October 1422
Regnal titles
Preceded by Charles V	King of France; 16 September 1380 – 21 October 1422	Succeeded by Charles VII contested by Henry II
Preceded by Charles V	Dauphin of Viennois; 3 December 1368 – 26 September 1386	Succeeded by Charles III
Preceded by Charles III	Dauphin of Viennois; 28 December 1386 – 6 February 1392	Succeeded by Charles IV
