= Pierre Salmon =

Salmon gives a copy of his Dialogues to Charles VI, from manuscript BnF fr. 23279

Salmon and Charles VI in discussion, from manuscript Geneva fr. 165

Pierre Salmon (fl. 1396–1424) was a French clergyman, courtier and diplomat under Charles VI.

Salmon was educated at a university. He was in the royal service by 1395. In 1396, he accompanied Charles VI's daughter Isabelle to England for her marriage to King Richard II. In England, he was accused of treason and theft. He afterwards made a pilgrimage to Notre-Dame de Halle and visited Utrecht. He was a royal secretary to Charles VI from shortly before 1406 until at least 1417. In this capacity, he travelled to Avignon, Rome, Lucca and Pisa on diplomatic missions before the end of 1409.

Salmon wrote a Middle French advice book or "mirror for princes" dedicated to Charles VI, entitled Dialogues. It was published against the backdrop of the a civil war in France and the papal schism. The first version, completed in 1409, survives in a single illustrated manuscript designed to be presented to the king. It contains a prologue and three sections. A second, revised version was made by Salmon between 1412 and 1415. It contains a fourth section. It survives in three manuscripts, including an illustrated presentation copy. Production of the two presentation copies was supervised by Salmon himself.

The prologue of the Dialogues contains a dedication and an explanation of its structure. The first section is written in the form of answers to the king's questions. It is divided into three parts on the virtues, habits and choice of counsellors of a king. The three virtues which a king must possess are the fear of God, honouring of the royal dignity and upholding of justice. The second section maintains the question-and-answer format. Its topic is the Bible (divine escripture) and it ranges from questions on the divine essence to divine mercy in the afterlife. The third section is a description of Salmon's services to the king. It begins by quoting a letter from Charles asking Salmon to write up his experiences in royal service. Salmon's narrative is interspersed with thirty of his official letters from the period 1407–1409. He ends by expressing hope that he has found a physician who can cure the king of his mental ailment.

When Salmon revised the Dialogues, every section was edited, the third most drastically. He removed all but four of the letters and added three new ones. All seven letters are addressed to the king. In the last one, he expresses his intention to withdraw from the world. The new fourth section is a dialogue between him and three ladies who visit him in his retreat—Reason, Faith and Hope. This section is modelled on Boethius' Consolation of Philosophy.

== Bibliography ==
- Bourassa, Kristin Leigh Erika (2014). Counselling Charles VI of France: Christine de Pizan, Honorat Bovet, Philippe de Mézières, and Pierre Salmon (PhD diss.). University of York.
- Hedeman, Anne D. (2001). Of Counselors and Kings: The Three Versions of Pierre Salmon's Dialogues. University of Illinois Press.
- Hedeman, Anne D. (2009). "Making Memories for a Mad King: Illustrating the Dialogues of Pierre Salmon". Gesta. 48 (2): 169–184. JSTOR 29764906.
