= Joan II of Auvergne =

15th-century French countess

Joan II
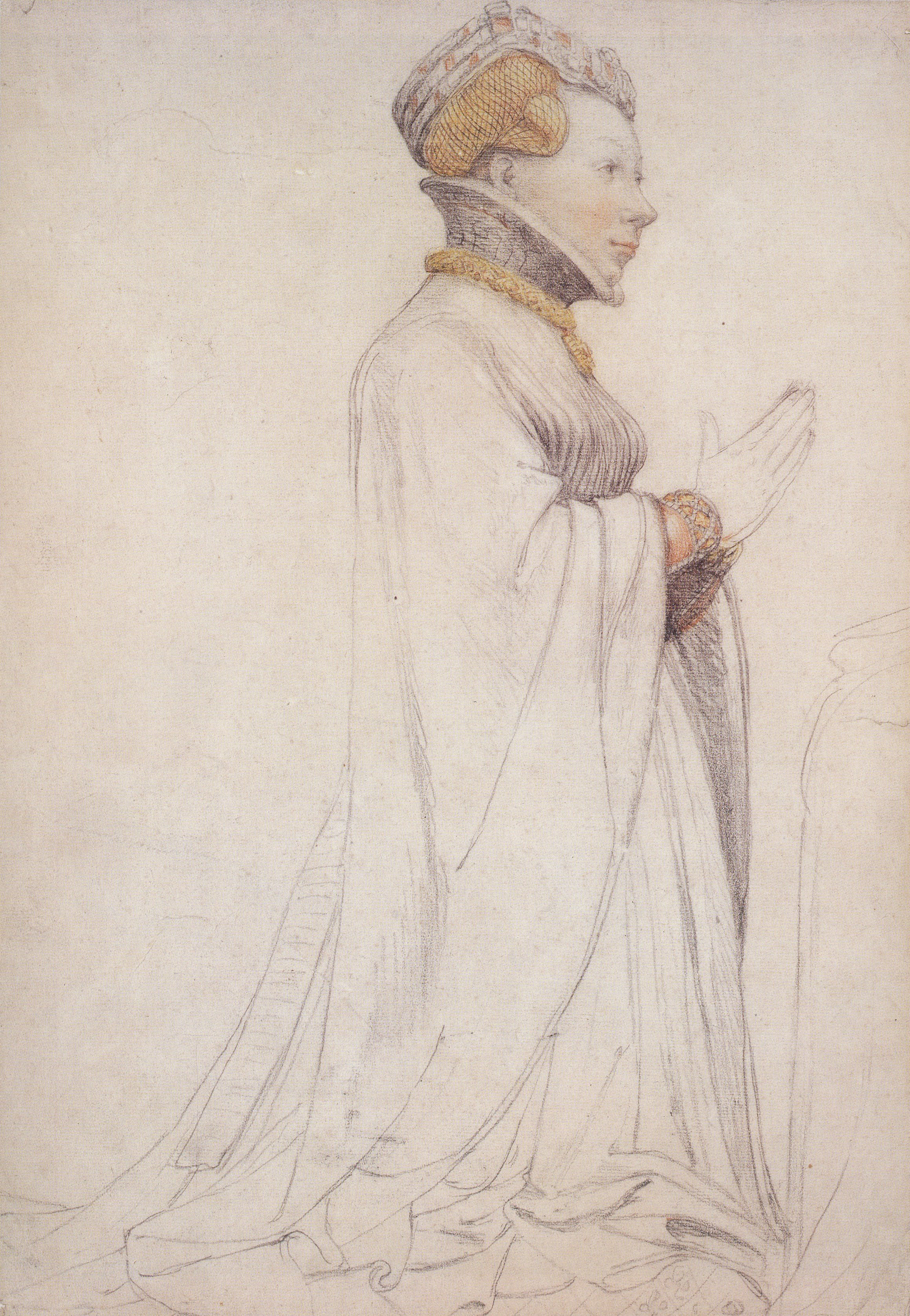
- Hans Holbein's drawing of a sculpture of Joan by Jean de Cambrai, 1523/24.

Countess of Auvergne and Boulogne
- Tenure: 1404 - 1424
- Predecessor: John II
- Successor: Marie I & II
- Born: c. 1378
- Died: c. 1424 (aged c. 46)
- Noble family: Auvergne
- Spouses: John, Duke of Berry; Georges de La Trémoille
- Father: John II of Auvergne
- Mother: Aliénor of Comminges

Joan II (French: Jeanne d'Auvergne 1378 – c. 1424) was the countess of Auvergne and Boulogne from 1394 until 1424 as well as the duchess of Berry by marriage. She was the daughter of John II, Count of Auvergne (died 1394), and second wife of John, Duke of Berry. She is arguably most famous for saving the life of her nephew King Charles VI of France, during the disastrous Bal des Ardents (Ball of the Burning Men).

== Life ==
Joan was born around 1378 to John II, Count of Auvergne and Boulogne and his wife Aliénor de Comminges. Joan's grandfather, John I, had been an uncle of Queen Joan of France, a previous heiress to Auvergne and Boulogne; John inherited the counties when his great-nephew, Joan's son, Duke Philip I of Burgundy, died without issue. Joan II's mother was a descendant of Peter II of Courtenay, the Latin emperor of Constantinople, who in turn descended from Louis VI of France.

In 1389, Joan was married to John, Duke of Berry, a son of John II of France, whose wife had died in the previous year. They had no children.

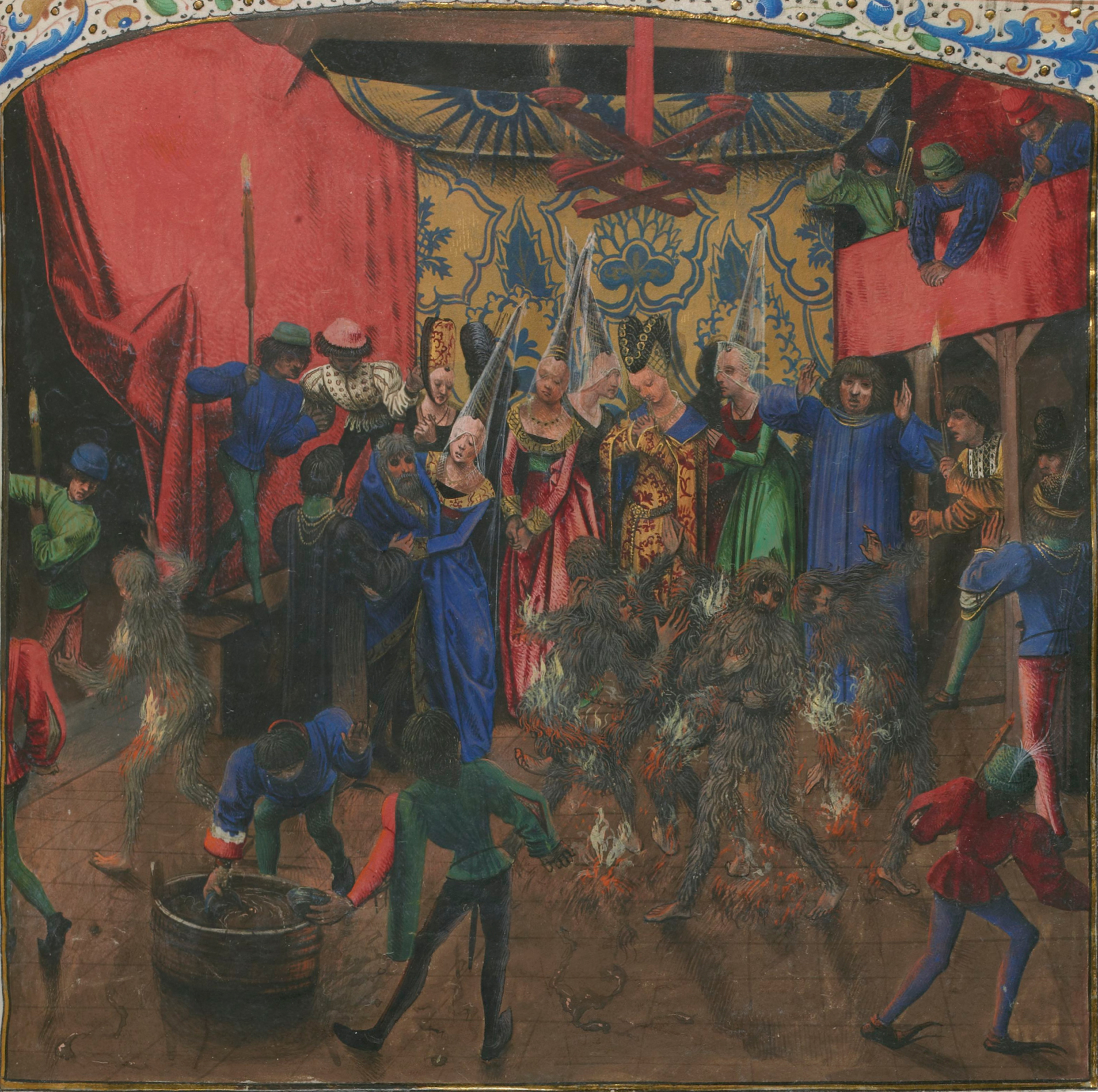
The Bal des Ardents

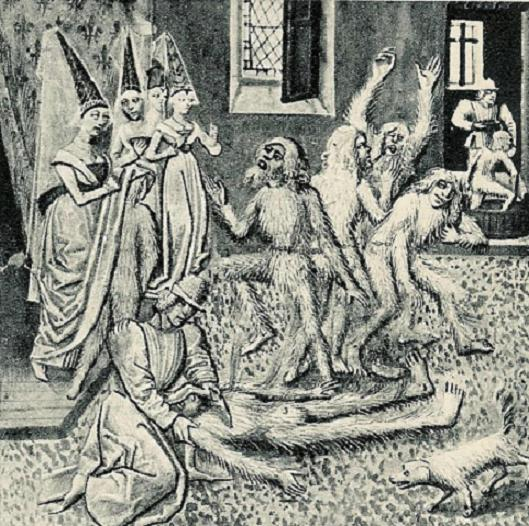
Joan covers the King with her dress

=== Role in Bal des Ardents ===
At the age of fifteen, Joan was present at the infamous Bal des Ardents given by Queen Isabeau, wife of the Duke of Berry's nephew King Charles, on 28 January 1393. During this, the King and five nobles dressed up as wildmen, clad "in costumes of linen cloth sewn onto their bodies and soaked in resinous wax or pitch to hold a covering of frazzled hemp," and proceeded to dance about chained together. At length, the King became separated from the others, and made his way to the Duchess, who jokingly refused to let him wander off again until he told her his name. When Charles' brother, Louis of Orléans, accidentally set the other dancers on fire, Joan swathed the King in her skirts, protecting him from the flames and saving his life.

=== Sovereign ===
Upon her father's death in 1394, Joan became Countess of Auvergne and Boulogne. Joan was widowed upon the death of the Duke of Berry in 1416. She married Georges de La Trémoille soon after; however, they produced no children, and the counties passed to her cousin, Marie, upon her death in 1424.

== Sources ==
- Echols, Anne and Marty Williams, An Annotated Index of Medieval Women, Markus Weiner Publishing Inc., 1992.
- Emmerson, Richard K. (2013). Key Figures in Medieval Europe: An Encyclopedia. Routledge. ISBN 978-1136775185.
- Müller, Christian; Kemperdick, Stephan; Ainsworth, Maryan, eds. (2006). Hans Holbein the Younger: The Basel Years, 1515–1532. Prestel. ISBN 978-3-7913-3580-3.
- Tuchman, Barbara (1978). A Distant Mirror: The Calamitous 14th Century. Ballantine. ISBN 978-0-345-34957-6.

French nobility
Preceded by John II and III	Countess of Auvergne and Boulogne; 1394–1424 with John III and IV (1404–1416); George (1416–1424)	Succeeded by Marie I and II
