= John II of Auvergne =

John II
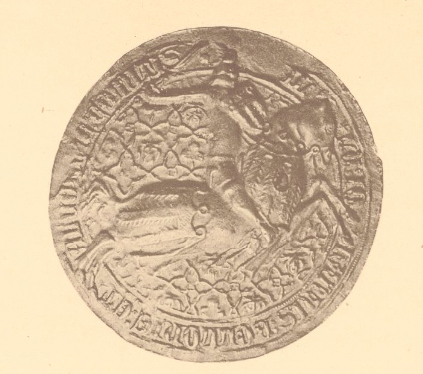
- Seal of John II

Count of Auvergne and Boulogne
- Reign: 1386 - 1404
- Predecessor: John I
- Successor: Joan II
- Born: XIV century
- Died: 28th of September 1404
- Noble family: House of Auvergne
- Spouse: Aliénor of Comminges
- Issue: Joan II of Auvergne
- Father: John I of Auvergne
- Mother: Joan of Clermont

John II (14th century – 28 September 1404) was the Count of Auvergne and Boulogne from 1386 until his death in 1404.

== Life ==
In 1375, John suffered from a head abscess that caused frequent fevers. He eventually recovered in September of that year.

In 1384, John participated in his cousin John I, Count of Empúries's war against Peter IV of Aragon. That same year, John was reportedly poisoned. Popular belief at the time held that his brother-in-law, Raymond of Turenne, was responsible, poisoning him during a feast hosted by the cardinal Hugues de Saint-Martial. The poison was said to have caused all of John's hair and nails to fall off. Though he was eventually cured, the incident left him mentally troubled for the rest of his life.

On 22 March 1386, John's father, John I, wrote his testament, naming John, his only male heir. Two days later, his father died, and John succeeded him as Count of Auvergne and Boulogne.

John's reputation as an administrator was poor, as he granted much of his land to his son-in-law, John, Duke of Berry.

On 26 July 1394, John wrote his testament, naming his only daughter, Joan, as his heir. He also named his nephew, Antoine of Boulogne, as a secondary heir in the event of Joan's death, though this provision was ultimately unnecessary.

While historian Étienne Baluze suggests that John died shortly after writing his testament, other sources assert that he died on 28 September 1404, having entrusted his domains to his daughter.

== Family and issue ==
In 1373, John married Aliénor de Comminges (c. 1350 – 1380), the daughter of Raymond II, Count of Comminges and Joan of Comminges. Aliénor had previously been married to Bertrand II of L'Isle-Jourdain, who died without children. Around 1380, she left John, reportedly despising him as a poor administrator. She went to live with a cousin in the Urgell and left their only daughter, Joan, with another cousin, Gaston III, Count of Foix, where Joan remained until her marriage to John of Berry.

French nobility
Preceded by John I and II	Count of Auvergne and Boulogne; 1386–1404	Succeeded by Joan II
