= John I of Auvergne =

John I
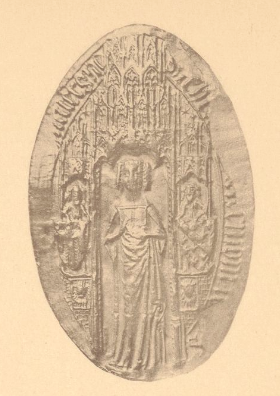
- Seal of John I's wife, Jeanne de Clermont

Count of Auvergne and Boulogne
- Reign: 1361-1386
- Predecessor: Philip I, Duke of Burgundy
- Successor: John II of Auvergne
- Died: 24 March 1386
- Noble family: House of Auvergne
- Spouse: Joan of Clermont
- Issue: John II of Auvergne; Marie of Auvergne
- Father: Robert VII of Auvergne
- Mother: Marie of Dampierre

John I (died on 24 March 1386) was a member of the House of Auvergne who reigned as Count of Auvergne and Count of Boulogne from 1361 until his death. He was the eldest son of Robert VII, Count of Auvergne and Boulogne, by his second wife, Marie of Dampierre. Auvergne and Boulogne were inherited by John's elder half-brother, William XII, Count of Auvergne, passing to William's only child, Joan, and then to her only child, Philip. When the adolescent Count Philip died following a riding accident, the counties passed to John, his granduncle.

In 1328, John married Joan of Clermont. They had:

- Marie married Raymond VII, Viscount of Turenne
- John II, succeeded to the counties of Auvergne and Boulogne
- Jeanne married Beraud of Auvergne

== Sources ==
- Memoires (1913). "Deuxieme mariage". Mémoires (in French). 35–36. Typographie V Tardy-Pigelet & Fils.
- Schnerb, Bertrand (1997). Enguerrand de Bournonville et les siens: un lignage noble du Boulonnais aux XIV et XV Siecles. Presses Paris Sorbonne.

Preceded by Philip II	Count of Auvergne and Boulogne; 1361–1386	Succeeded by John II
