= Marguerite, bâtarde de France =

Illegitimate daughter of French king

Marguerite de Valois
- Born: 1407
- Died: January 1458 (aged 50–51)
- Noble family: Valois
- Spouse: Jean III de Harpedenne
- Father: Charles VI of France
- Mother: Odette de Champdivers

Marguerite de Valois, la demoiselle de Belleville, also known as Marguerite, bâtarde de France (1407 – January 1458), was the illegitimate daughter of Charles VI of France and his mistress Odette de Champdivers.

Marguerite was legitimated in January 1428 by Charles VII of France, her half-brother. He gave her a very ample dowry and married her June/July 1443 in Poitou to Jean III de Harpedenne (also spelled Harpedanne, Harpedane, Harpedène, etc.), Seigneur of Belleville and Montaigu, son of Jean II de Harpedenne and his wife Jeanne de Mussidan. Some sources claim that she was married under the name of Marguerite de Falots.

== Sources ==
- Marchandisse, Alain; Kupper, Jean-Louis, eds. (2003). A l'ombre du pouvoir: les entourages princiers au Moyen Age (in French). Librairie Droz.
