= Laplander =

Laplander may refer to:

- Something from or related to Lapland (disambiguation)
- Sámi people, the indigenous people of Lapland
- Laplander, an inhabitant of Finnish Lapland, regardless of ethnicity
- Volvo Laplander L3314, a type of military vehicle produced by Volvo
- LAPLander (Light Airbag Protected Lander), a space probe
- The song by British producer Finn Keane, previously known as easyFun
