= George Onslow (composer) =

French composer (1784–1853)

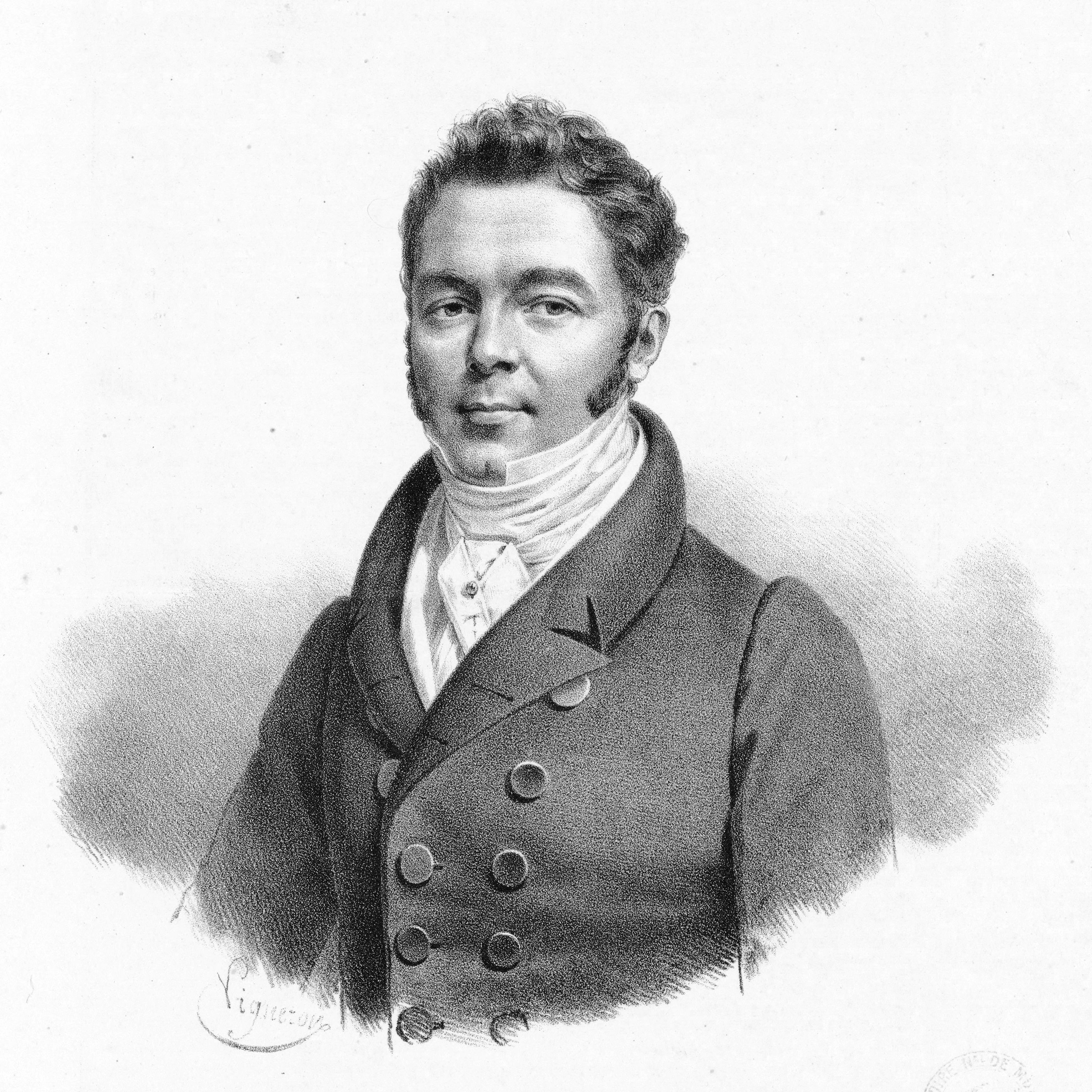
George Onslow

André George(s) Louis Onslow (27 July 1784 – 3 October 1853) was a French composer of English descent. His wealth, position and personal tastes allowed him to pursue a path unfamiliar to most of his French contemporaries, more similar to that of his contemporary German romantic composers; his music also had a strong following in Germany and in England. His principal output was chamber music, but he also wrote four symphonies and four operas. Onslow was esteemed by critics of his time, but his reputation declined swiftly after his death. It has only been revived in recent years.

== Life ==
George Onslow was born in Clermont-Ferrand to an English father, Edward Onslow, and a French mother, Marie Rosalie de Bourdeilles de Brantôme; his paternal grandfather was George Onslow, 1st Earl of Onslow. In Onslow's own brief autobiography (written in the third person) he comments that in his childhood, "music studies formed but a secondary part of his education" but names Jan Ladislav Dussek and Johann Baptist Cramer amongst his piano teachers. It has been suggested that he received this tuition in London under the aegis of his grandfather the Earl. However, other research indicates he may not have studied with Dussek until 1797–1798 in Hamburg, where his family was living in exile after his father had become involved in counter-revolutionary activities in France. This research also indicates that there is no evidence to support the suggestions sometimes made that Onslow at any time visited Vienna, or that he met, or studied, there with Ludwig van Beethoven.

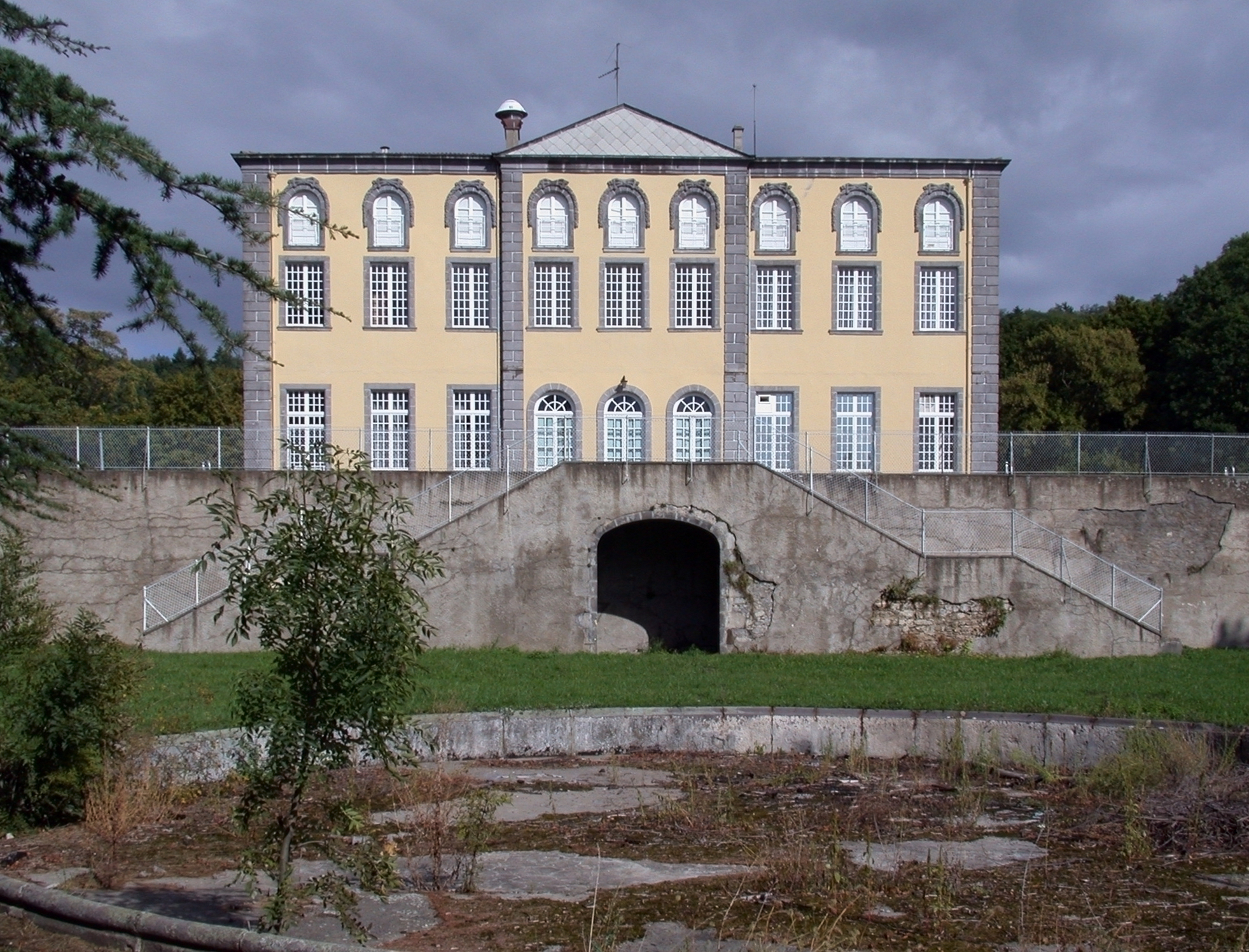
Château de Chalendrat

Onslow states in his autobiography that his attitude to music was transformed by his experience of hearing the overture to Étienne Méhul's opera Stratonice in Paris in 1801. In Onslow's own later words: "On hearing this piece, I experienced so lively an emotion in the depths of my soul that I sensed myself at once penetrated by feelings previously unknown to me; even today this moment is present in my thought. After this, I saw music with other eyes; the veil which had hidden its beauties from me was rent; it became the source of my most intimate joy, and the faithful companion of my life." This led him to compose his first string quintets (Op. 1 nos. 1–3) and string quartets (Op. 4 nos. 1–3), although he had not at this stage received any composition tuition. These were published at his own expense; Onslow was always wealthy and did not need critical or financial support. The critic François-Joseph Fétis noted that, despite his absence of training, Onslow "had all the leisure necessary to overcome these obstacles". Onslow learnt to play the cello, and would play the chamber music of Mozart, Haydn and Beethoven with other local amateurs. However, aware of the need to develop his technical musical skills, in 1808 he began to study composition with Anton Reicha in Paris. At this time he also married a French heiress, Charlotte Françoise Delphine de Fontanges, by whom he was to have three children.

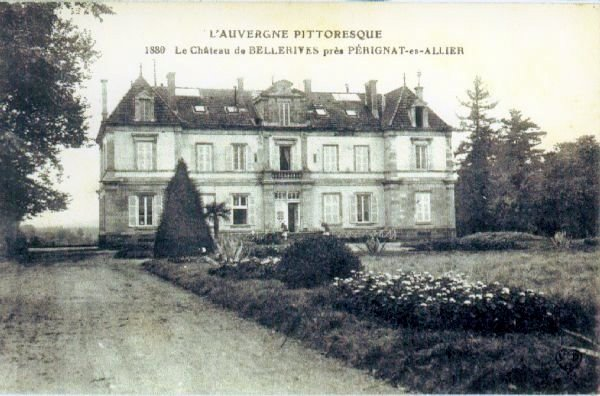
Château de Bellerives, Pérignat (demolished 1990), on an old postcard

Onslow based himself near Clermont-Ferrand, initially at his father's Château de Chalendrat at Mirefleurs (where at the age of six he had planted many of the trees), later at Château de Bellerives at Perignat, La Roche-Noire. He typically visited Paris during the winter (concert) season, when his works were often performed by musicians including the violinists Pierre Baillot and Théophile Tilmant, and the brothers Dancla, who gave quartet concerts. In 1824 and 1827 his first two operas, L'Alcalde de la vega and Le colporteur, were premiered at the Théâtre Feydeau in Paris under the auspices of the Opéra-Comique. Le colporteur was also produced in Germany, and even (in a very mangled version, in 1831), in London. In 1825 in Paris he met the 16-year-old Felix Mendelssohn, who enjoyed a performance of one of Onslow's quartets but was surprised that he was not aware of Beethoven's opera Fidelio. Onslow was an early enthusiast of the music of Hector Berlioz, whose Eight scenes from Faust (1829) and overture Les francs-juges (1830) he praised. In 1829, after Onslow had commenced his quintet op. 38 (his fifteenth), he was very seriously wounded in a hunting accident, which left him partially deaf in one ear; completing the quintet in the aftermath, he named the final movements "Fever", "Convalescence" and "Recovery". The work was subtitled "De la Balle" ("The Bullet").

Throughout the 1820s, Onslow's reputation continued to grow both in France and abroad as a series of trios, quartets and quintets were published. Onslow's publishers in Paris were Ignaz and Camille Pleyel. In 1818 his works began to be published in Germany by Breitkopf und Härtel and in Austria by C. F. Peters; the same year saw the first writings about his works by German music critics. Other German publishers, including Hoffmeister, Steiner and Simrock, followed in later years. In the 1830s, Onslow's quartets were in the repertoire of the Müller Quartet, which played them at the Meiningen court of Duke Bernhard II, and of the Prague-based quartet of Friedrich Pixis the younger.

In 1831 Onslow was elected the second Honorary Fellow of the Philharmonic Society of London (Felix Mendelssohn had been the first). He wrote for the Society his Second Symphony, Op. 42, and continued to maintain close relations with leading London musicians including John Ella and George Frederick Anderson. In 1834, Frédéric Chopin and Franz Liszt played Onslow's Grand Sonata for four hands Op. 22 at their debut joint performance in Paris. From 1835 to 1838 Onslow was the President of the Athenée musical in Paris, an association founded in 1829 "to propagate the study and the spirit of music", with the intention of bringing together both amateurs and professionals. The year 1837 saw the premiere in Paris of Onslow's third (and last) opera Le duc de Guise. In 1839 Onslow founded the "Société Philharmonique de Clermont" in which the émigré Polish violinist Alexandre Tarnowski was very active. Performances were given of Onslow's own chamber music, and also of his opera Guise, including passages which had been cut from the Paris performances. At the instigation of Tarnowski, Onslow also hosted in Clermont-Ferrand the Polish-Jewish xylophonist and rival of Josef Gusikov, Sankson Jakubowski.

In 1842 Onslow's wealth increased on the death of his father-in-law, who owned extensive property. In the same year his French musical prestige was consolidated when he succeeded Luigi Cherubini as a member of the Académie des Beaux-Arts. Invited to the Aachen music festival in 1846, in the following year, on what may have been his last journey outside France, Onslow conducted his Fourth Symphony in Cologne, at the Niederrheinisches Musikfest. During his last years he wrote a number of pieces for large chamber ensemble with piano, including quintets, a sextet (Op. 77b) and a septet (Op. 79); he also wrote a nonet (op. 77a) for strings and woodwind. Onslow died unexpectedly (although after a period of declining health) in Clermont-Ferrand in 1853, after taking a morning walk.

Onslow was made a Knight of the Legion of Honour in 1837.

== Music ==
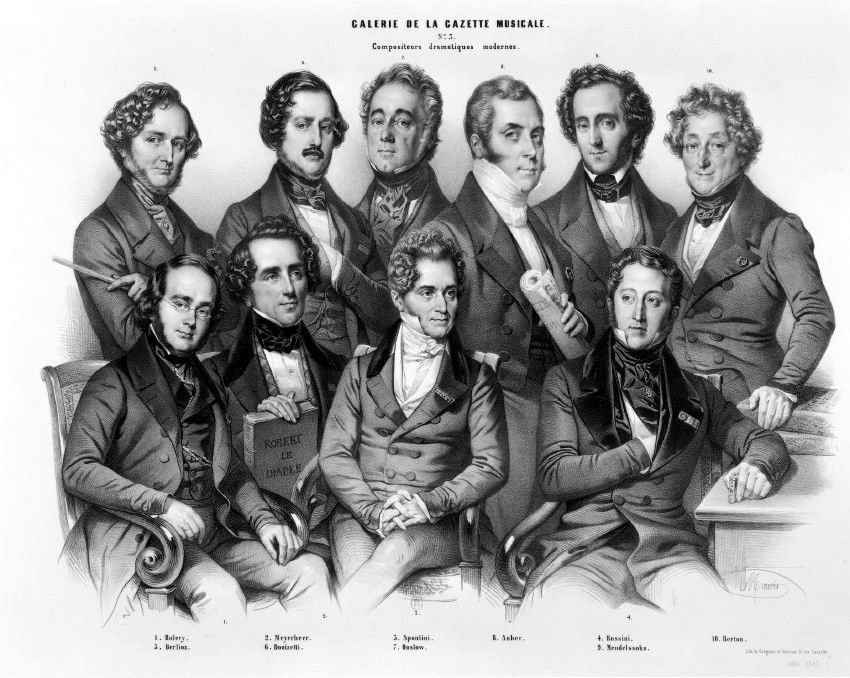
"Galerie des compositeurs dramatiques modernes" (1844) by Nicolas-Eustache Maurin (d. 1850). The engraving shows (back row left to right): Hector Berlioz, Gaetano Donizetti, Onslow, Daniel Auber, Felix Mendelssohn, Henri-Montan Berton; (front row left to right): Fromental Halévy, Giacomo Meyerbeer, Gaspare Spontini, Gioacchino Rossini

Onslow was a prolific composer of chamber music (including 36 string quartets and 34 string quintets). He also wrote 10 piano trios, three performed operas (an early opera, Les deux oncles, remains in manuscript) and four symphonies, apart from various works for solo piano, piano duet, and sonatas for solo strings and piano. Of his string quintets, the first three (Op. 1) were written for two violins, two violas and cello, as with the quintets of Mozart. The remainder were nearly all written for two violins, one viola, and two cellos. After hearing the virtuoso double-bassist Domenico Dragonetti step in to play in a performance of his tenth quintet, Onslow began to provide in his subsequent quintets the option of replacing one of the cellos with a double-bass.

Onslow's emphasis on instrumental music, and his base in Clermont-Ferrand, set him apart from many French composers of his era, for whom opera was a principal aspiration – the period after 1830, in particular, was a time when Paris led the world in grand opera. His interest in chamber ensembles and forms seemed to align him more closely with German musical traditions. Moreover, being possessed of an independent fortune, he could write for himself rather than needing to pander to the desires of audiences or impresarios. Fétis complained in 1830: "Nature worked in vain to have a Haydn or a Beethoven born in France; such talent was better concealed in the capital than are diamonds deep in the earth. It was the same with chamber music such as quartets and quintets. If M. Onslow has been able to establish a fine reputation in this genre, it is because his social position renders him independent...he is still better known abroad than in France. The lack of encouragement for instrumental music, a taste for futilities, and other secondary causes which it would be too tedious to detail, have left us insensible to anything but fantasies, variations and other trivia."

Such comments enabled Onslow's publisher Camille Pleyel, in the same year, to promote the composer as "notre Beethoven français" ("our French Beethoven"), an epithet which was to be frequently repeated by critics, and was also a trigger for rebuttal by those not so convinced of the similarity; as for example Paul Scudo who wrote in 1854 that to compare Onslow with Beethoven was like comparing Casimir Delavigne (a popular librettist of the time) with Shakespeare. Indeed Onslow himself would have disowned comparison with Beethoven's late style, according to his conversation as recorded by the music journalist Joseph d'Ortigue: "The last quartets of Beethoven are mistakes, absurdities, the reveries of a sick genius....I would burn everything I have composed if I someday wrote anything resembling such chaos." However Onslow's interest in classical forms and counterpoint, and the styles of emotional expressiveness in his music, place his music close to the works of his teacher Reicha, and to Onslow's German and Austrian contemporaries of early Romantic music, such as Moscheles, Hummel, and Schubert. In the opinion of Robert Schumann, only Onslow and Mendelssohn approached Beethoven's mastery of the quartet form.

In the years after his death, Onslow's reputation progressively declined. When Richard Wagner was conducting the overture to the opera L'Alcalde de la Vega in London for the Philharmonic Society in 1855, he found it "trivial" and threatened to quit his contract for the rest of the Society's concert series. However, from the late twentieth century onwards, commercial recordings of his music began to appear.
