= Llap =

Llap or variation, may refer to:

- Llap (region), a region of Kosovo
- Llap (river), a river in Kosovo
- Live Long and Prosper (LLAP), a greeting originating from 1960s Star Trek

== See also ==
- Lap (disambiguation)
- Lapp (disambiguation)
- IIAP (disambiguation)
- IAP (disambiguation)
- UAP (disambiguation)
