= Lappi =

Lappi may refer to:

== Lapland ==
- Finnish name for Lapland (disambiguation)
- Lapland (Finland), a region of Finland
- Lapland (historical province of Finland)
- Lappmarken, a historical region in Sweden and Finland inhabited by the Sámi
- Sápmi, a transnational region inhabited by the Sámi

== Other places ==
- Lappi, Finland, a former municipality in the Satakunta region, Finland
- Lappi, Tampere, a district in the city of Tampere, Finland
- Lappi, a former name of Tuomioja (village), Satakunta region, Finland
- Lappi, Pakistan, a small town in Punjab Province, Pakistan

== Other ==
- Lappi cheese
- "Lapland (Lappi)", a suite on the 1997 album Angels Fall First by Nightwish
