= Lapp =

Lapp or LAPP may refer to:

- Lapp, a historical term for the Sámi people, sometimes considered offensive
- Lapp (surname)
- Local Authorities Pension Plan, now branded LAPP, a Canadian not-for-profit defined benefit pension plan
- Light art performance photography, photographic technique emphasizing landscapes, scenery and objects with light
- Laboratoire d'Annecy de physique des particules, a French experimental physics laboratory
- LAPP software stack, a variation on the LAMP software stack
- LAPP (company), a corporate group in the field of connection technology headquartered in Stuttgart
- the Lapp test for trademark infringement, after Interpace Corp. v. Lapp, Inc., 721 F.2d 460 (3d Cir. 1983)

== See also ==
- Lappland (disambiguation)
- Lap (disambiguation)
- llap (disambiguation)
- IAPP (disambiguation)
