= Lapponia =

Lapponia or Laponia (Latin for Lapland) may refer to:

- Lapland (disambiguation), various regions in northern Scandinavia
- Laponia, a UNESCO World Heritage Site in Sweden.
- Lapponia (book), a 1673 ethnographic account of Lapland by Johannes Schefferus
- Lapponia (train), a Finnish express passenger train
- "Lapponia" (song), a song by Monica Aspelund, covered by Northern Kings
- Lapponia, a Finnish brand of cloudberry liqueur
