= Lepley =

Lepley is a surname. Notable people with the surname include:

- Tucker Lepley (born 2002), American soccer player
- Tyler Lepley (born 1987), American actor
- Coltt Winter Lepley (born 1995), American songwriter

== See also ==
- Lapp
