= Final lap =

The final lap or "ultimate lap" is the last lap, last time around a circuit, in a circuit racing race.

Final Lap may also refer to:

== Sports and games ==
- Extreme E: Desert X-Prix: The Final Lap, a 2025 race event, the finale of the Extreme E racing series, the last ever race weekend of Extreme E before it closed down
- Final Lap (or Final Lap 1), 1987 racing simulation videogame from Namco, first in the Final Lap series of videogames
- Final Lap, a series of videogames from Namco; see List of Namco games

== Other uses ==
- The Final Lap Tour, 2023–2024 concert tour by 50Cent
- Final Lap (novel), a novel by Malcom Rose in the Traces novel series about MALC and forensic investigator Luke Harding

== See also ==
- Green–white–checkered finish, the final laps of a NASCAR race
- Final (disambiguation)
- Lap (disambiguation)
