= IIAP =

IIAP may refer to:

- Type 85-IIAP - a battle tank
- Indian Institute of Astrophysics (IIA or IIAP)
- Institut international d’administration publique - a French service public academy
- Institute for Informatics and Automation Problems - a development institute of the National Academy of Sciences of Armenia

== See also ==
- llap (disambiguation)
- IAP (disambiguation)
- AP2 (disambiguation)
