= Lapp (surname) =

Lapp is a surname. Notable people with the surname include:

- Bernice Lapp (1917–2010), American Olympic swimmer
- Daniel Lapp, Canadian folk musician
- Henry Lapp (1862–1904), American carpenter-cabinetmaker
- Jack Lapp (1884–1920), American professional baseball player
- Katherine Lapp, administrator of Harvard University
- Nancy Lapp (born 1930), American archaeologist and biblical scholar
- Oskar Lapp (1921–1987), German inventor
- Ralph Lapp (c. 1910–2004), American physicist
- Ursula Ida Lapp (1930–2021), German entrepreneur
