= Lappland =

Lappland can refer to:

== Places ==
- Lapland (disambiguation), a geographic region in Northern Fennoscandia
  - Lapland (Sweden), historical province of Sweden
  - Lapland (Finland), a region of Finland
  - Lappmarken, the historic region of Sweden (including Finland) inhabited by the Sámi
  - Sápmi, a transnational region inhabited by the Sámi
  - Lapland (historical province of Finland)
  - Lapland (former province of Finland), a province of Finland (1938–2009)
  - Lapland (parliamentary electoral district), an electoral district in Finland
- Lappland (nature reserve) in Västmanland County, Sweden

== Other uses ==
- Lappland, a character in the video game Arknights
- HMS Lappland, a Swedish naval ship name

== See also ==
- Lapland (disambiguation)
- Lapp (disambiguation)
- Land (disambiguation)
