= LAPP (company) =

German industrial corporation

Lapp Holding SE

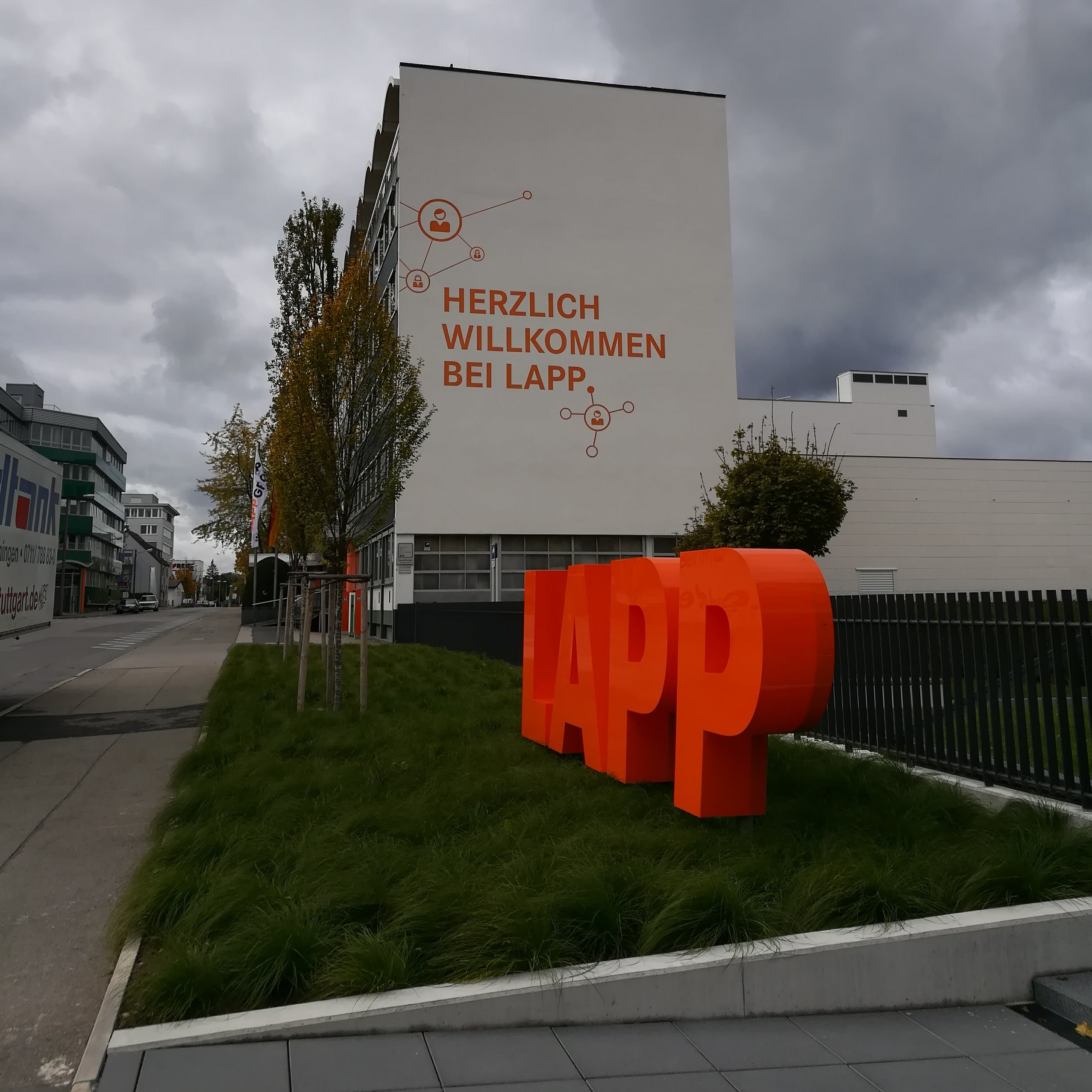
- Headquarters of LAPP in Stuttgart, Germany
- Type: SE
- Predecessor: U.I. Lapp KG, Lapp Holding AG
- Founded: 1959; 67 years ago
- Founders: Ursula Ida Lapp, Oskar Lapp
- Headquarters: Stuttgart, Germany
- Key people: Matthias Lapp (Chairman)
- Products: Power cables, telecommunication cables, electrical connectors, harnessing solutions
- Revenue: €1,930 million (2025)
- Number of employees: 5,700 (2025)
- Website: www.lapp.com

LAPP is a German corporate group based in Stuttgart in the cable and optical fibre industry. The holding company of the group is Lapp Holding SE. The LAPP Group employs approximately 5,700 people.

== Company profile ==
LAPP develops, manufactures and distributes products for cable and connection technology. Its customers are active in sectors including mechanical engineering, industrial automation, energy, mobility, food processing, industrial communications and infrastructure. The company develops and manufactures cables, industrial connectors, cable glands, cable harnesses, and communication technology products for industrial applications.

Since around 2010, Lapp has been supplying cables for electric vehicles.

== History ==
In 1959, Ursula Ida Lapp and her husband Oskar Lapp founded U.I. Lapp KG in Stuttgart to manufacture and distribute Oskar Lapp's invention Ölflex, the first industrially produced flexible control cable with color coding. In 1963, the first company-owned factory was opened, and in 1965 the headquarters — until then the family-owned house in Stuttgart-Vaihingen — was relocated to the nearby Schultze-Delitzsch-Straße, where it remains today. In 1966, LAPP started producing rectangular industrial connectors.

The company's international expansion began in 1976 with the establishment of its first foreign subsidiary in the United States. Following the sudden death of Oskar Lapp in 1987, Ursula Ida Lapp, alongside her sons Siegbert and Andreas Lapp, took over the leadership of the corporate group. In 1998, the first production site in India was opened in Bangalore.

In 2004, LAPP and Jebsen & Jessen founded a joint venture, JJ-Lapp, to focus on the Southeast Asian market. In 2016, the group acquired the Italian company CEAM Cavi Speciali, based in Monselice, which specializes in data cables for industrial Ethernet and fieldbus systems.

In October 2022, Matthias Lapp succeeded Andreas Lapp as Chairman of the Executive Board of LAPP Group, marking the transition of the company's operational management to the third generation of the family.

In 2025, LAPP acquired all shares of JJ-Lapp.
