= Montpeyroux, Puy-de-Dôme =

Montpeyroux
- Commune
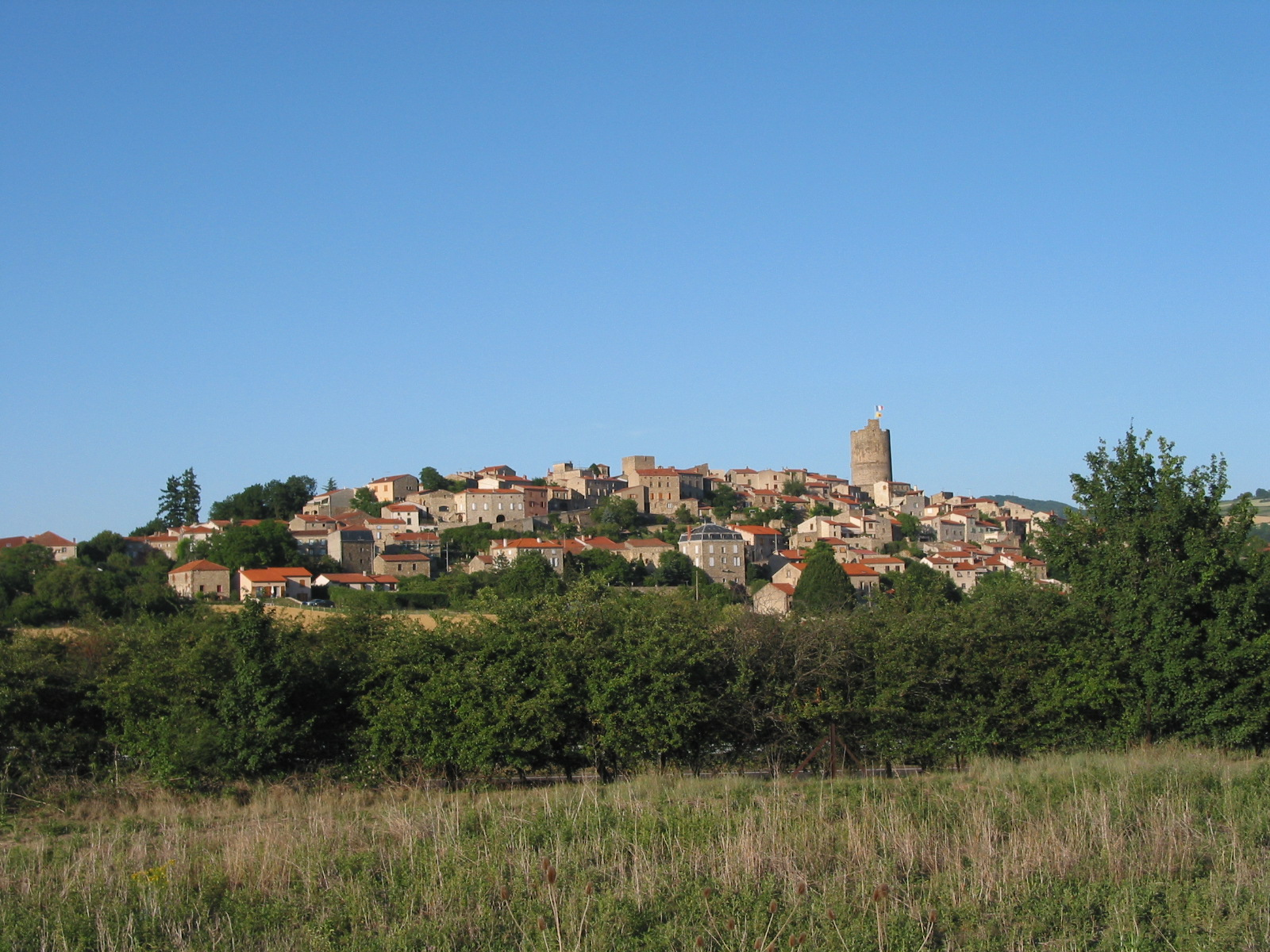
- A general view of Montpeyroux

- Coat of arms
- Location of Montpeyroux
- Location within France Location within Auvergne-Rhône-Alpes
- Coordinates: 45°37′25″N 3°12′18″E
- Country: France
- Region: Auvergne-Rhône-Alpes
- Department: Puy-de-Dôme
- Arrondissement: Issoire
- Canton: Vic-le-Comte
- Intercommunality: Agglo Pays d'Issoire

Government
  - Mayor (2026–32): Christophe Rochette
- Area^{1}: 3.29 km^{2} (1.27 sq mi)
- Elevation: 482 m (1,581 ft)
- Highest elevation: 484 m (1,588 ft)
- Lowest elevation: 342 m (1,122 ft)
- Population (2023): 330
  - Density: 100/km^{2} (260/sq mi)
- Time zone: UTC+01:00 (CET)
  - Summer (DST): UTC+02:00 (CEST)
- INSEE/Postal code: 63241 /63114
- ^{1} French Land Register data, which excludes lakes, ponds, glaciers > 1 km^{2} (0.386 sq mi or 247 acres) and river estuaries.

Montpeyroux (French pronunciation: [mɔ̃peʁu]; Occitan: Montpeirós) is a commune in the Puy-de-Dôme department in Auvergne-Rhône-Alpes in central France. It is a member of Les Plus Beaux Villages de France (The Most Beautiful Villages of France) Association.

== See also ==
- Communes of the Puy-de-Dôme department
