= Sallèdes =

- Commune
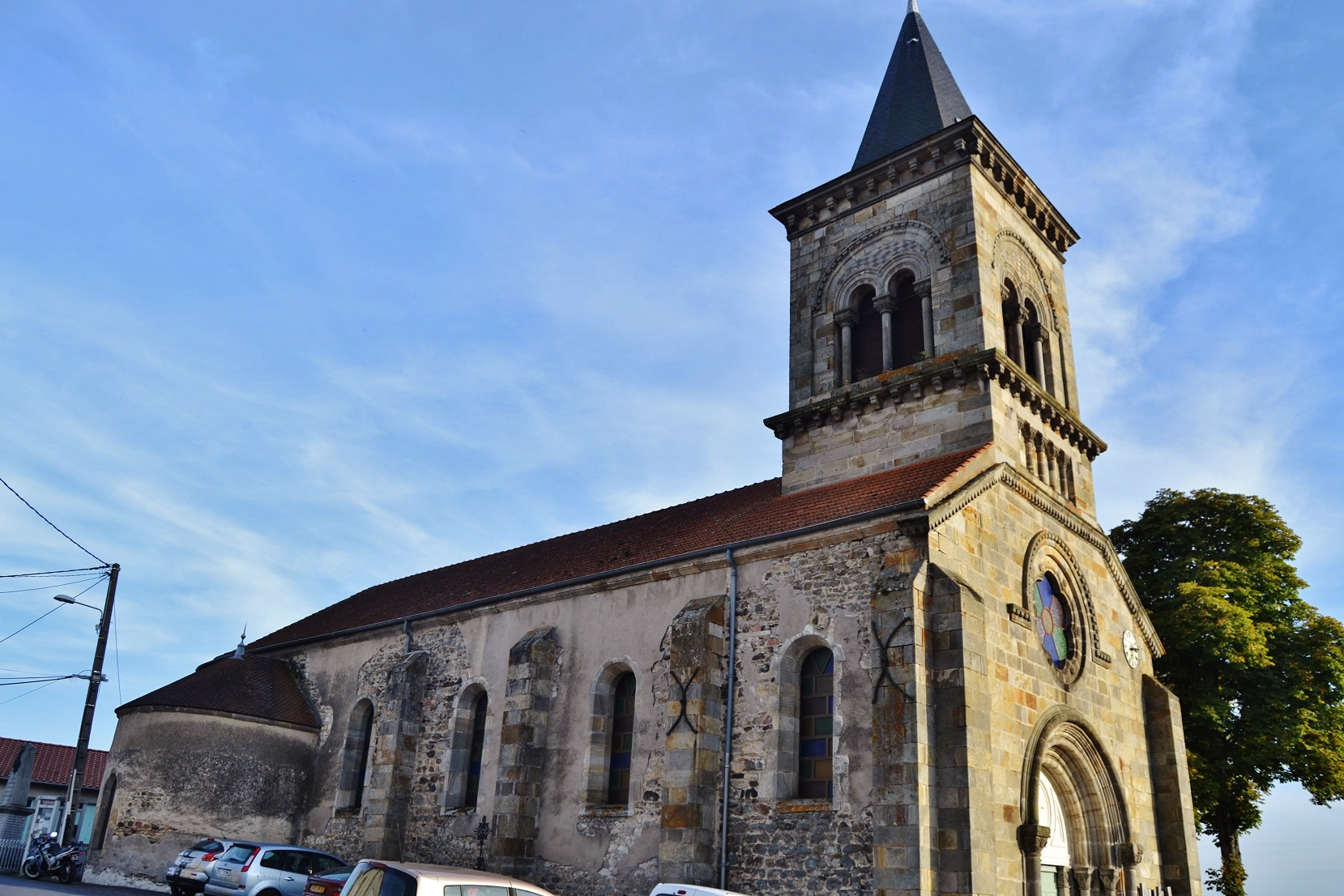
- The church in Sallèdes
- Location of Sallèdes
- Location within France Location within Auvergne-Rhône-Alpes
- Coordinates: 45°39′N 3°20′E
- Country: France
- Region: Auvergne-Rhône-Alpes
- Department: Puy-de-Dôme
- Arrondissement: Clermont-Ferrand
- Canton: Vic-le-Comte

Government
  - Mayor (2026–32): Alexandre Pagès
- Area^{1}: 18.81 km^{2} (7.26 sq mi)
- Elevation: 650 m (2,130 ft)
- Highest elevation: 815 m (2,674 ft)
- Lowest elevation: 476 m (1,562 ft)
- Population (2023): 560
  - Density: 30/km^{2} (77/sq mi)
- Time zone: UTC+01:00 (CET)
  - Summer (DST): UTC+02:00 (CEST)
- INSEE/Postal code: 63405 /63270
- ^{1} French Land Register data, which excludes lakes, ponds, glaciers > 1 km^{2} (0.386 sq mi or 247 acres) and river estuaries.

Sallèdes (French pronunciation: [salɛd]; Occitan: Saledas) is a commune in the Puy-de-Dôme department in Auvergne in central France.

== See also ==
- Communes of the Puy-de-Dôme department
