= Saint-Maurice, Puy-de-Dôme =

Saint-Maurice
- Commune
- Coat of arms
- Location of Saint-Maurice
- Location within France Location within Auvergne-Rhône-Alpes
- Coordinates: 45°40′18″N 3°14′13″E
- Country: France
- Region: Auvergne-Rhône-Alpes
- Department: Puy-de-Dôme
- Arrondissement: Clermont-Ferrand
- Canton: Vic-le-Comte
- Intercommunality: Mond'Arverne Communauté

Government
  - Mayor (2026–32): Cécile Gilbertas
- Area^{1}: 5.4 km^{2} (2.1 sq mi)
- Elevation: 460 m (1,510 ft)
- Highest elevation: 781 m (2,562 ft)
- Lowest elevation: 334 m (1,096 ft)
- Population (2023): 968
  - Density: 180/km^{2} (460/sq mi)
- Time zone: UTC+01:00 (CET)
  - Summer (DST): UTC+02:00 (CEST)
- INSEE/Postal code: 63378 /63270
- ^{1} French Land Register data, which excludes lakes, ponds, glaciers > 1 km^{2} (0.386 sq mi or 247 acres) and river estuaries.

Saint-Maurice (French: [sɛ̃ mɔʁis]; Auvergnat: Sant Maurici de Limanha) is a commune in the Puy-de-Dôme department in Auvergne in central France.

== See also ==
- Communes of the Puy-de-Dôme department
