= Lap (disambiguation) =

A lap is the area on top of the thighs of a sitting person.

== Lap ==
Lap may also refer to:

- One circuit in a speed sport, e.g. around a race track or swimming pool
- Lapping or "to lap", an abrasive machining process
- Lap joint, a technique for joining two materials
- Laps, Puy-de-Dôme, France
- Laps, an outdated name for the Sámi people

People with surname Lap:

- Geert Lap (born 1951), Dutch ceramist
- Miroslav Lap (born 1950), Yugoslav ice hockey player

== LAP ==
LAP may refer to:

- Los Angeles Pacific Railroad
- Manuel Márquez de León International Airport, IATA code
- La Plata (Amtrak station), Missouri, USA (Amtrak code)
- Lambert Academic Publishing, a publishing house of the VDM Group
- Latency-associated peptide, associated with tumors
- Leukocyte alkaline phosphatase, in white blood cells
- Language/action perspective, a computational paradigm
- Líneas Aéreas Paraguayas, former national airline of Paraguay
- Linhas Aéreas Paulistas – LAP, former Brazilian airline
- Lima Airport Partners, operator of the airport in Peru
- Limiting absorption principle, a concept in Spectral Theory (Mathematics)
- Luzenac Ariège Pyrénées, a French association football team
- Light-addressable potentiometric sensor, light sensor technology
- Liberian Action Party, a defunct political party in Liberia
- Lysergic acid propylamide, a drug related to LSD
- Linguistic Atlas Project, a linguistic project about American English

== LAPS ==
- Local Administrator Password Solution, a tool by Microsoft

== Other ==
- Lanthanum phosphide, a chemical compound with the formula LaP

== See also ==
- Lapp (disambiguation)
- llap (disambiguation)
- IAP (disambiguation)
