= Neschers =

- Commune
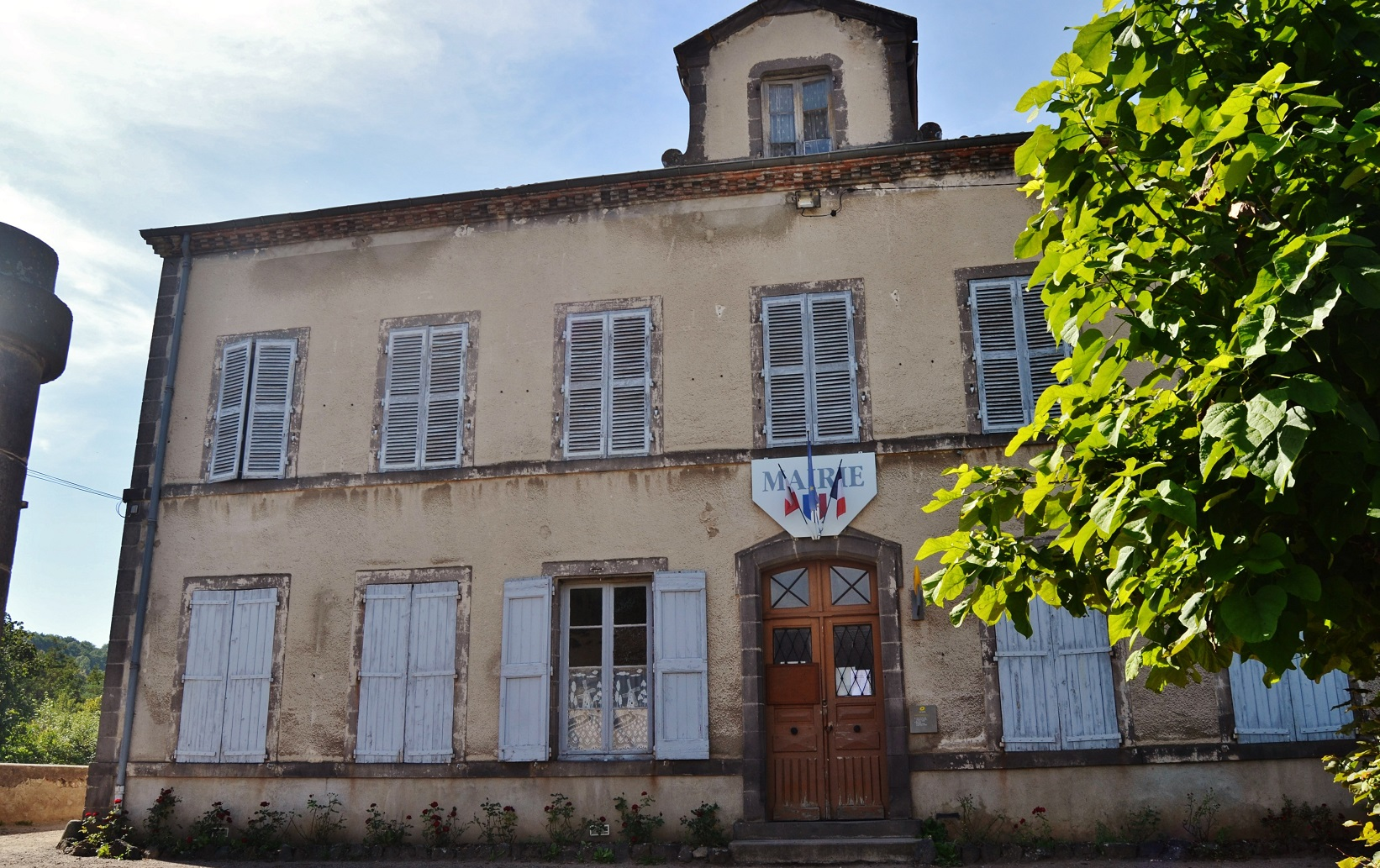
- The town hall in Neschers
- Location of Neschers
- Location within France Location within Auvergne-Rhône-Alpes
- Coordinates: 45°35′28″N 3°09′50″E
- Country: France
- Region: Auvergne-Rhône-Alpes
- Department: Puy-de-Dôme
- Arrondissement: Issoire
- Canton: Vic-le-Comte
- Intercommunality: Agglo Pays d'Issoire

Government
  - Mayor (2026–32): Christine Oudoul
- Area^{1}: 9.78 km^{2} (3.78 sq mi)
- Elevation: 414 m (1,358 ft)
- Highest elevation: 580 m (1,900 ft)
- Lowest elevation: 365 m (1,198 ft)
- Population (2023): 908
  - Density: 92.8/km^{2} (240/sq mi)
- Time zone: UTC+01:00 (CET)
  - Summer (DST): UTC+02:00 (CEST)
- INSEE/Postal code: 63250 /63320
- ^{1} French Land Register data, which excludes lakes, ponds, glaciers > 1 km^{2} (0.386 sq mi or 247 acres) and river estuaries.

Neschers is a commune in the Puy-de-Dôme department in Auvergne-Rhône-Alpes in central France.

== See also ==
- Communes of the Puy-de-Dôme department
