= Parent, Puy-de-Dôme =

Parent
- Commune
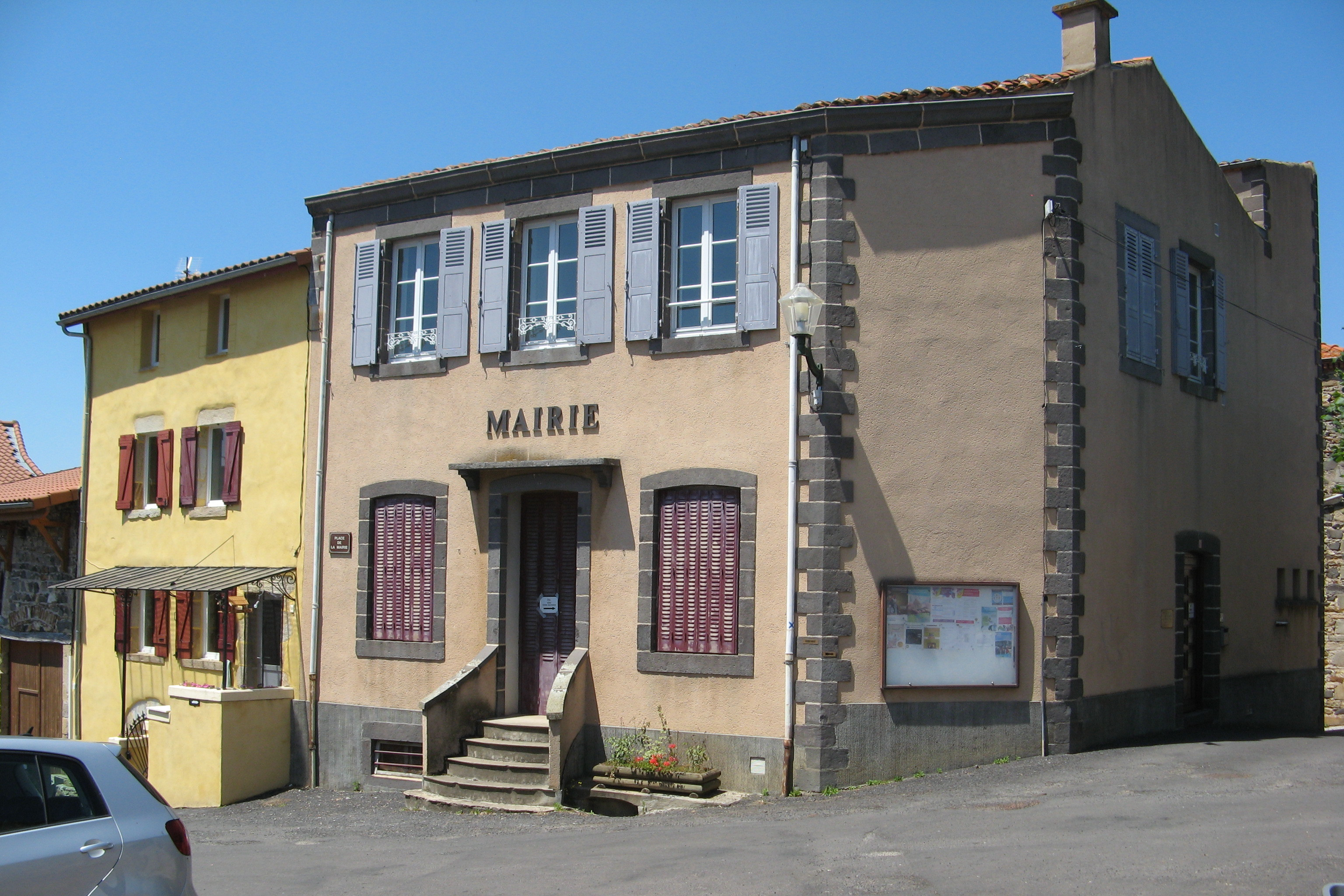
- The town hall in Parent
- Location of Parent
- Location within France Location within Auvergne-Rhône-Alpes
- Coordinates: 45°37′29″N 3°13′52″E
- Country: France
- Region: Auvergne-Rhône-Alpes
- Department: Puy-de-Dôme
- Arrondissement: Issoire
- Canton: Vic-le-Comte
- Intercommunality: Agglo Pays d'Issoire

Government
  - Mayor (2026–32): Vincent Tourlonias
- Area^{1}: 3.76 km^{2} (1.45 sq mi)
- Elevation: 450 m (1,480 ft)
- Highest elevation: 652 m (2,139 ft)
- Lowest elevation: 344 m (1,129 ft)
- Population (2023): 879
  - Density: 234/km^{2} (605/sq mi)
- Time zone: UTC+01:00 (CET)
  - Summer (DST): UTC+02:00 (CEST)
- INSEE/Postal code: 63269 /63270
- ^{1} French Land Register data, which excludes lakes, ponds, glaciers > 1 km^{2} (0.386 sq mi or 247 acres) and river estuaries.

Parent (French pronunciation: [paʁɑ̃]) is a commune in the Puy-de-Dôme department in Auvergne in central France.

== See also ==
- Communes of the Puy-de-Dôme department
