= Saint-Georges-sur-Allier =

- Commune
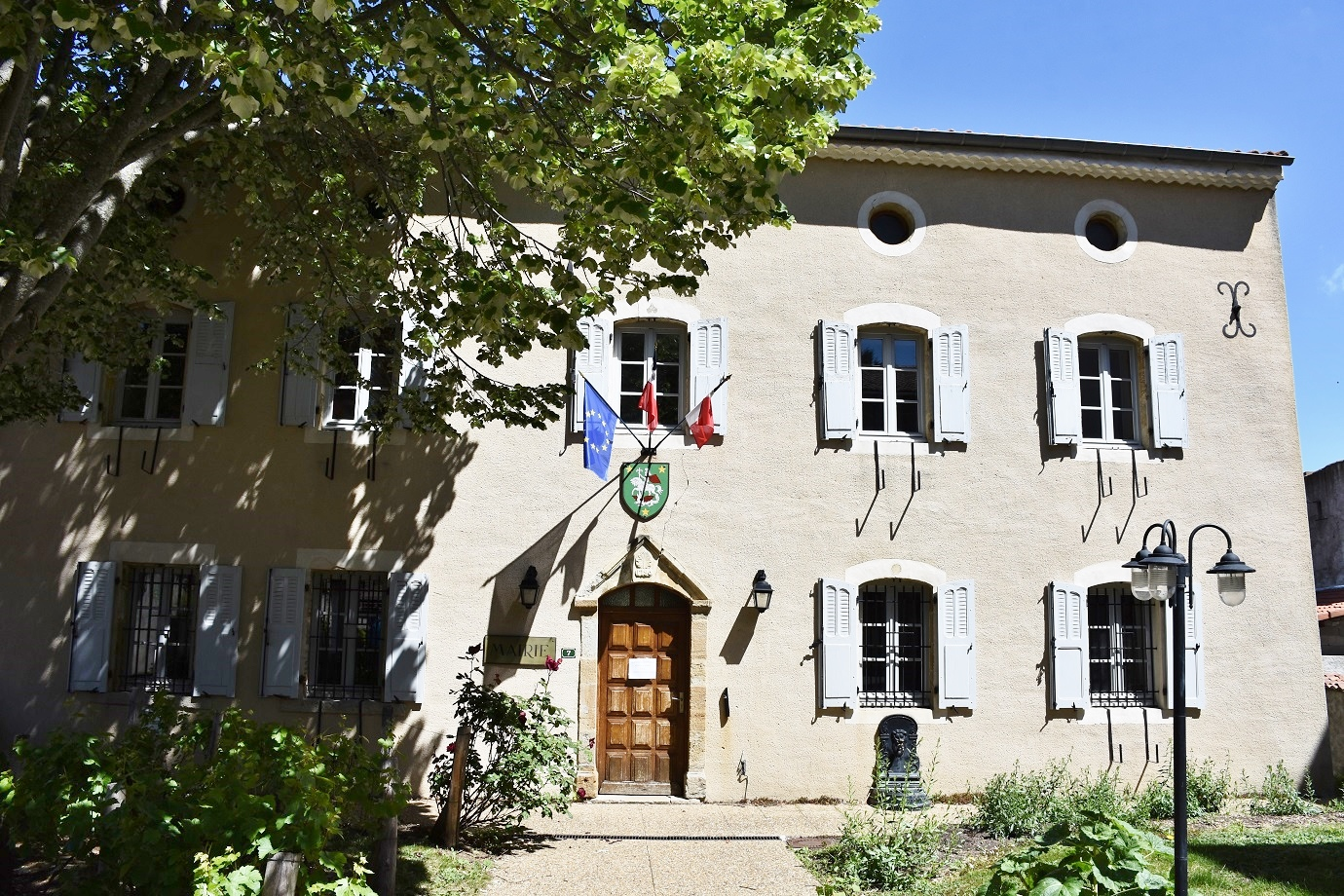
- Saint-Georges-sur-Allier Town hall

- Coat of arms
- Location of Saint-Georges-sur-Allier
- Location within France Location within Auvergne-Rhône-Alpes
- Coordinates: 45°42′36″N 3°14′35″E
- Country: France
- Region: Auvergne-Rhône-Alpes
- Department: Puy-de-Dôme
- Arrondissement: Clermont-Ferrand
- Canton: Vic-le-Comte

Government
  - Mayor (2020–2026): Cédric Meynier
- Area^{1}: 9.42 km^{2} (3.64 sq mi)
- Elevation: 450 m (1,480 ft)
- Highest elevation: 614 m (2,014 ft)
- Lowest elevation: 358 m (1,175 ft)
- Population (2023): 1,395
  - Density: 148/km^{2} (384/sq mi)
- Time zone: UTC+01:00 (CET)
  - Summer (DST): UTC+02:00 (CEST)
- INSEE/Postal code: 63350 /63800
- ^{1} French Land Register data, which excludes lakes, ponds, glaciers > 1 km^{2} (0.386 sq mi or 247 acres) and river estuaries.

Saint-Georges-sur-Allier (French pronunciation: [sɛ̃ ʒɔʁʒ syʁ alje], literally Saint-Georges on Allier; Occitan: Sent Jòrdi d'Alèir) is a commune in the Puy-de-Dôme department in Auvergne-Rhône-Alpes in central France.

== See also ==
- Communes of the Puy-de-Dôme department
