= Pignols =

- Commune
- Location of Pignols
- Location within France Location within Auvergne-Rhône-Alpes
- Coordinates: 45°38′N 3°17′E
- Country: France
- Region: Auvergne-Rhône-Alpes
- Department: Puy-de-Dôme
- Arrondissement: Clermont-Ferrand
- Canton: Vic-le-Comte

Government
  - Mayor (2020–2026): Paul Gauthier
- Area^{1}: 9.29 km^{2} (3.59 sq mi)
- Elevation: 600 m (2,000 ft)
- Highest elevation: 781 m (2,562 ft)
- Lowest elevation: 450 m (1,480 ft)
- Population (2023): 337
  - Density: 36.3/km^{2} (94.0/sq mi)
- Time zone: UTC+01:00 (CET)
  - Summer (DST): UTC+02:00 (CEST)
- INSEE/Postal code: 63280 /63270
- ^{1} French Land Register data, which excludes lakes, ponds, glaciers > 1 km^{2} (0.386 sq mi or 247 acres) and river estuaries.

Pignols is a commune in the Puy-de-Dôme department in Auvergne in central France.

== See also ==
- Communes of the Puy-de-Dôme department
