= ARTES =

ARTES (Advanced Research in Telecommunications Systems) is the European Space Agency's long-running, large-scale programme to support the development of advanced satcom products and services.

The ARTES Programme facilitates research and development activities as well as providing a framework for partnerships within the industry with goal of contributing to the development of European and Canadian industries. It assists them in the development of advanced technologies and concepts that form the basis for competitive products and services.

Through ARTES, TIA plays an investment role by supporting public-private partnerships that contribute to the development and deployment of new satellite systems, allowing the demonstration and validation of future services.

The ARTES Programme is composed of the following elements:

- ARTES 1 (Preparatory) : strategic analysis, market analysis, technology and system feasibility studies, and the development and support of new satcom standards.
- ARTES 3 and 4 (Products) : a very wide-ranging section covering everything from payload components to entire telecom systems
- ARTES 5 (Technology) : long-term technological development driven by ESA or by the satcom industry
- ARTES 7 (EDRS): development and implementation of the European Data Relay Satellite system
- ARTES 8 (Alphabus, Alphasat): development of the Alphabus platform and the Alphasat satellite is the first to use it
- ARTES 10 (Iris): development of the Iris system for satellite-based air traffic management
- ARTES 11 (Small GEO): development of the 'Luxor Platform' for small GEO satellites, to be launched on Hispasat
- ARTES 20 (Integrated Applications Programme): supporting the development of added value services based on the integration of existing satellite assets (e.g. telecommunications and earth observation)
