= Busséol =

- Commune
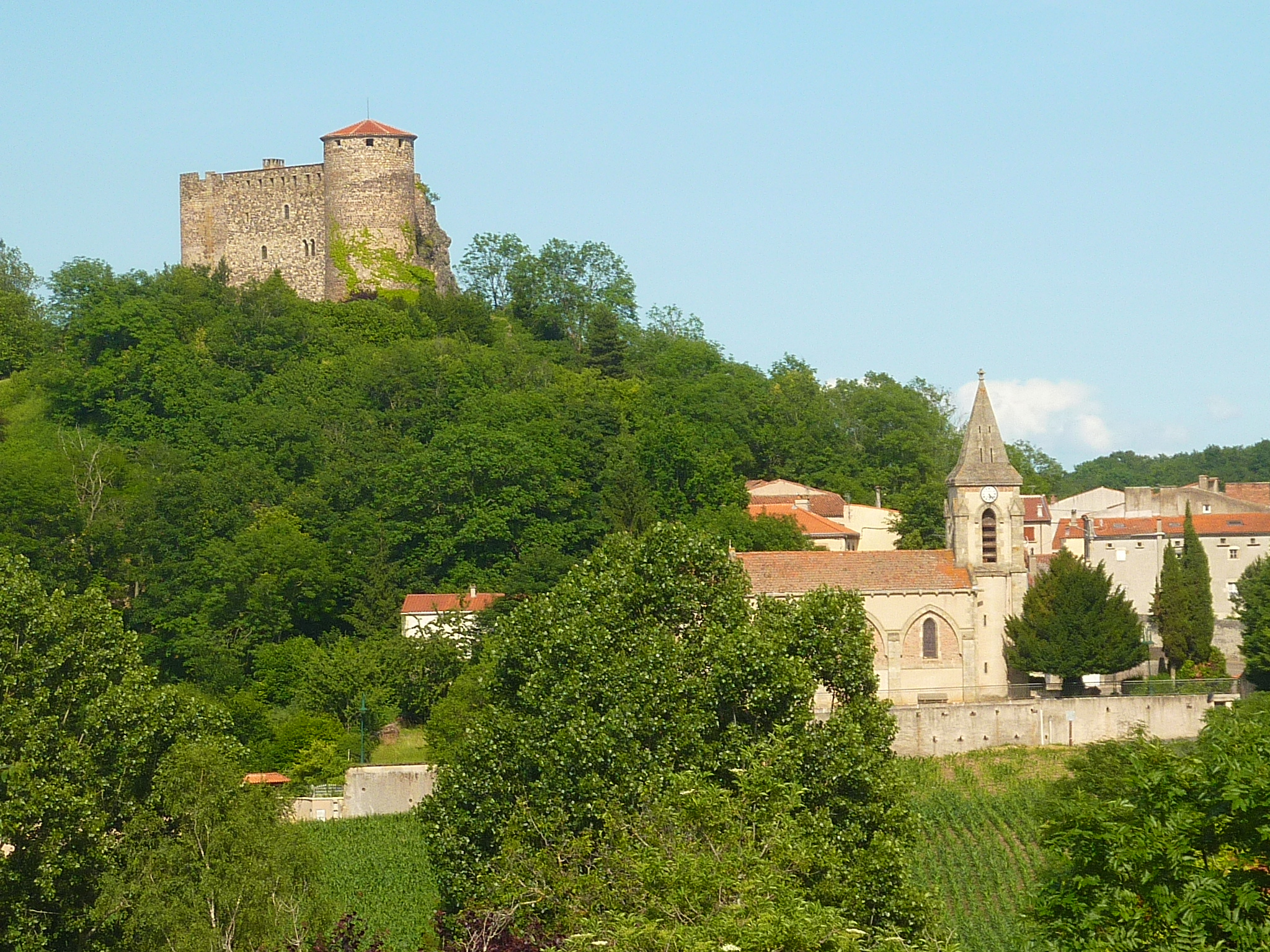
- The chateau in Busséol

- Coat of arms
- Location of Busséol
- Location within France Location within Auvergne-Rhône-Alpes
- Coordinates: 45°41′29″N 3°15′17″E
- Country: France
- Region: Auvergne-Rhône-Alpes
- Department: Puy-de-Dôme
- Arrondissement: Clermont-Ferrand
- Canton: Vic-le-Comte

Government
  - Mayor (2020–2026): Régis Chomette
- Area^{1}: 5.68 km^{2} (2.19 sq mi)
- Elevation: 535 m (1,755 ft)
- Highest elevation: 724 m (2,375 ft)
- Lowest elevation: 429 m (1,407 ft)
- Population (2023): 221
  - Density: 38.9/km^{2} (101/sq mi)
- Time zone: UTC+01:00 (CET)
  - Summer (DST): UTC+02:00 (CEST)
- INSEE/Postal code: 63059 /63270
- ^{1} French Land Register data, which excludes lakes, ponds, glaciers > 1 km^{2} (0.386 sq mi or 247 acres) and river estuaries.

Busséol (French pronunciation: [byseɔl]) is a commune in the Puy-de-Dôme department in Auvergne-Rhône-Alpes in central France.

== Population ==
Historical population
Year	Pop.	±% p.a.
1968	121	—
1975	140	+2.11%
1982	164	+2.29%
1990	182	+1.31%
1999	188	+0.36%
2007	189	+0.07%
2012	206	+1.74%
2017	218	+1.14%
2023	221	+0.23%
Source: INSEE

== See also ==
- Communes of the Puy-de-Dôme department
