= IAPS =

IAPS may refer to:

- Indian Army Public Schools
- International Academy for Philosophy of Science
- International Affective Picture System, a set of affective/emotional images used in psychological research
- International Association of Physics Students, a non-profit umbrella organization for physics students associations worldwide
- Independent Association of Prep Schools, a professional association for headteachers of independent preparatory schools in the UK and worldwide
- International Association of Patristic Studies; see 1990s president Robert Austin Markus
- Istituto di Astrofisica e Planetologia Spaziali, a research institute in Rome, Italy; part of the Italian National Institute for Astrophysics (INAF)

== See also ==
- IAP (disambiguation)
