= Sauvagnat-Sainte-Marthe =

- Commune
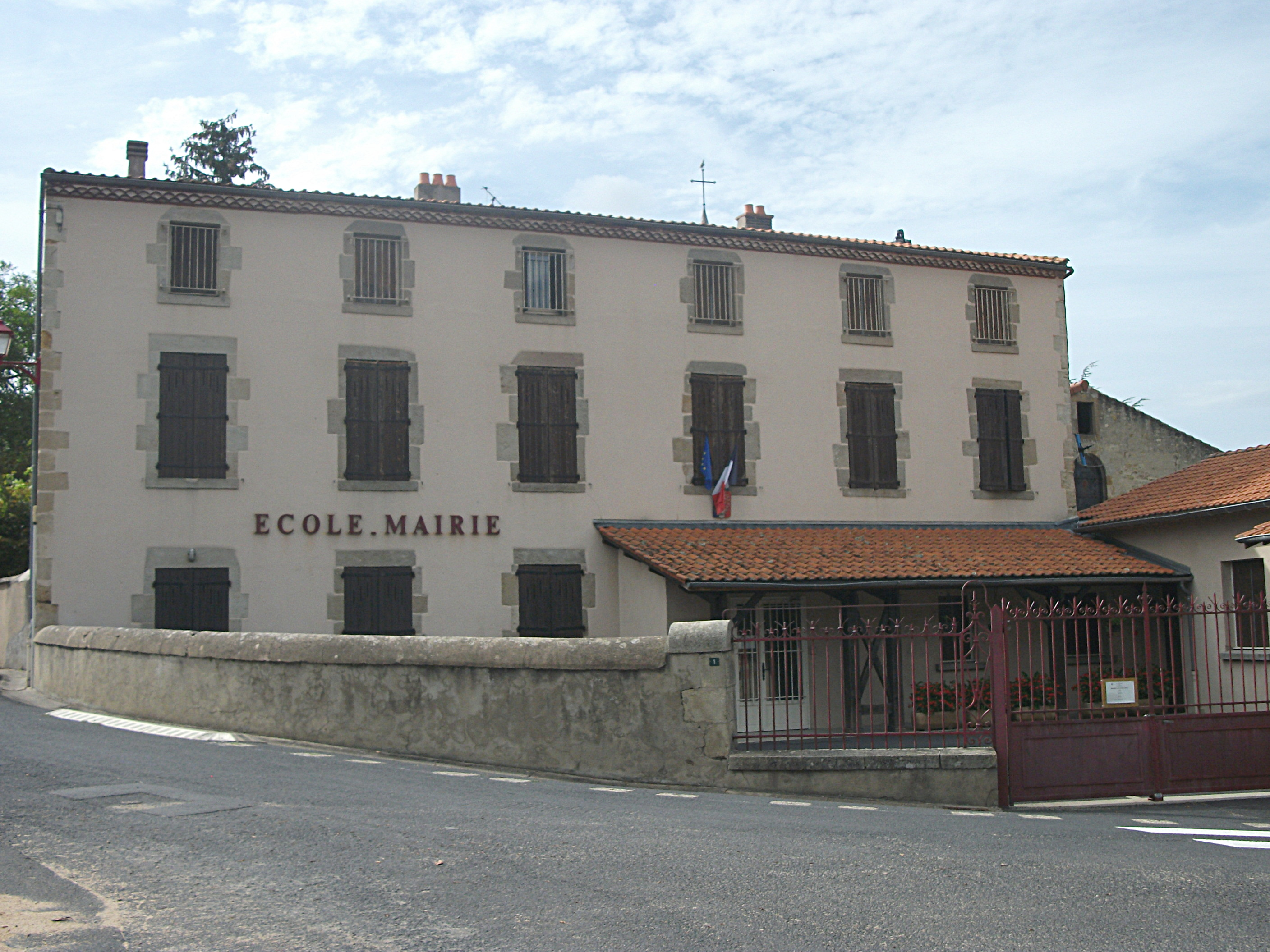
- Town hall

- Coat of arms
- Location of Sauvagnat-Sainte-Marthe
- Location within France Location within Auvergne-Rhône-Alpes
- Coordinates: 45°35′24″N 3°12′40″E
- Country: France
- Region: Auvergne-Rhône-Alpes
- Department: Puy-de-Dôme
- Arrondissement: Issoire
- Canton: Vic-le-Comte
- Intercommunality: Agglo Pays d'Issoire
- Area^{1}: 6.41 km^{2} (2.47 sq mi)
- Elevation: 400 m (1,300 ft)
- Highest elevation: 605 m (1,985 ft)
- Lowest elevation: 349 m (1,145 ft)
- Population (2023): 460
  - Density: 72/km^{2} (190/sq mi)
- Time zone: UTC+01:00 (CET)
  - Summer (DST): UTC+02:00 (CEST)
- INSEE/Postal code: 63411 /63500
- ^{1} French Land Register data, which excludes lakes, ponds, glaciers > 1 km^{2} (0.386 sq mi or 247 acres) and river estuaries.

Sauvagnat-Sainte-Marthe is a commune in the Puy-de-Dôme department in Auvergne-Rhône-Alpes in central France.

== See also ==
- Communes of the Puy-de-Dôme department
