= Jebsen & Jessen =

Industrial group based in Singapore

Jebsen & Jessen Group
- Type: Private
- Industry: engineering, manufacturing, mining, distribution
- Founded: 1963
- Headquarters: Singapore
- Number of locations: Operational entities in 16 countries on five continents, including 20 manufacturing, mining and processing facilities
- Key people: Heinrich Jessen (Chairman), Per Magnusson (Group CEO)
- Number of employees: 4000 (2023)
- Parent: Jebsen & Jessen Pte Ltd
- Website: https://jj-group.com/

Jebsen & Jessen Group is a diversified industrial conglomerate with operation offices across over 16 countries. It is a third generation family-owned enterprise and part of the Jebsen & Jessen Family Enterprise.

== Company information ==
Headquartered in Singapore with seven regional business units, Jebsen & Jessen Group had a turnover of S$1.6 billion in 2025, employs over 4,000 employees and has more than 50 subsidiaries and associate companies.

The company has several joint ventures including JJ-Lurgi Engineering (a joint venture with Air Liquide) and JJ-Pun (a joint venture with Serge Pun & Associates Group).

In May 2011, company executives indicated that the company has an acquisition war chest of SGD 250 million to support its growth strategy.

== History ==
Part of a global family enterprise that dates back to a trading partnership formed in Hong Kong in 1895. Jebsen & Jessen Group was formally incorporated in 1963 with operations in Singapore and Malaysia and subsequently set up offices throughout Southeast Asia. By 1971, the company had more than 600 employees and was trading pharmaceuticals, engineering, photographic products, construction equipment, and home appliances.

In the early 1970s, the company acquired agencies for luxury watch brands, formed an agreement with Demag AG, and set up mechanical handling engineering in 1972, trading and manufacturing hoists and cranes. In 1976, the company established Jebsen & Jessen Packaging.

In 1982, the group holding company Jebsen & Jessen (SEA) Pte Ltd was set up; its three departments included engineering, manufacturing, and trade and industry. In 1986, MHE-Demag became a 50:50 joint venture between Jebsen & Jessen (SEA) and Demag. By its 25th anniversary in 1988, the group had over 30 subsidiaries and employed 1,000 people.

On March 1, 1992, JJ-Lurgi was formed as a 50:50 joint venture between Jebsen & Jessen (SEA) and Lurgi AG. Current Chairman Heinrich Jessen joined the company as an environment, health, and safety manager in 1995.

In 2004, the group began a 50:50 joint venture with German Lapp Kabel, forming JJ-Lapp Cable. The group obtained ISO 14001 and OHSAS certifications across its 40 subsidiaries in 2004.

In 2010, the group expanded their regional reach by opening an office in Cambodia. and in July 2011, it entered Myanmar with a 50:50 joint venture with family-owned Serge Pun & Associates Group (SPA Group), forming JJ-Pun (S) Pte Ltd.

The group announced its acquisition of Halcyon Offshore, a leading offshore and marine services company, on May 28, 2012.

In March 2014, Jebsen & Jessen Ingredients made the move into manufacturing malted ingredients, signing a 50:50 joint venture agreement with UK firm Muntons.

In January 2015, MHE-Demag acquired Demag Cranes & Components Australia.

In March 2015, JJ-Lapp Cable acquired a 100% stake in PT JJ-Lapp Cable SM (JJSMI). This came five years after JJ-Lapp Cable and PT Sinarmonas entered a joint venture relationship.

In October 2015, the group divested its communications and healthcare divisions to Getz Healthcare.

In June 2016, JJ-Muntons opened the new 3,000-square-meter specialty malted manufacturing facility in Chonburi, Thailand.

In November 2016, MHE-Demag opened Southeast Asia's largest crane manufacturing plant in Malaysia.

In January 2018, the group and sister company Jebsen Group in China announced the establishment of a joint venture of equals in Greater China between Jebsen & Jessen Ingredients (JJING) and Jebsen Industrial Specialty Ingredients & Solutions Business (JI-SI&S).

=== Recent developments (2020–present) ===
Between 2020 and 2026, Jebsen & Jessen Group expanded its industrial and geographical footprint through key mergers and acquisitions in Southeast Asia, Australia, and East Asia, while increasing its focus on corporate sustainability frameworks.

In 2022, the group's engineering joint venture, JJ-Lurgi Engineering, was recognized at the Asia Corporate Excellence & Sustainability (ACES) Awards for its operational expansion across Malaysia, Indonesia and China.

In February 2023, Jebsen & Jessen acquired the Industrial Products Business (IPD) and Electro-Mechanical Services (EMS) unit from Finnish manufacturer Konecranes, expanding its regional industrial engineering footprint. In November 2023, the group released its 2022 Sustainability Report detailing its implementation of the Family Business for Sustainable Development (FBSD) framework, which included carbon mitigation efforts and corporate social responsibility projects supporting elephant conservation in Indonesia.

In August 2024, the group announced executive leadership transitions across its packaging division and JJ-LAPP joint venture. In September 2024, Jebsen & Jessen acquired a majority stake in MSM Group, a Mongolian industrial distribution enterprise specializing in heavy equipment, automotive, and beverage distribution. During the same period, the group expanded its materials and industrial operations through the acquisition of Australian material handling provider Safetech and global industrial abrasive supplier GMA Garnet Group.

== Businesses ==
Jebsen & Jessen group operates through seven business units serving industrial, manufacturing, infrastructure, mining, food production and consumer markets.

=== Ingredients ===
Jebsen & Jessen Ingredients distributes specialty chemicals, including additives, fillers, pigments, resins, solvents, cross linker, flame retardants, monomers/polymers, and performance chemicals to manufacturing industries; amino acids and protein sources to animal feed manufacturers; food additives and ingredients for the treatment and flavoring of food and beverages; and chemicals for the pharma industries.

=== Material Handling ===
The Material Handling business unit operates as MHE in several Asia markets and as Safetech in Australia. In 2023, Jebsen & Jessen Group acquired the Industrial Products business from Konekranes, continuing its operations under the MHE name. Business activities include manufacturing, distribution, rental and servicing of equipment used in lifting, loading, warehousing and building maintenance. Products include cranes, dock levellers, freight hoists, warehouse trucks, aerial work platforms and mechanical car parking systems.

=== Industrial Engineering ===
JJ-Lurgi offers technologies and engineering services for oil seed extraction, natural oils and fats production, and edible oil and biofuel processing. In 2022, the company received the Asia’s Best Performing Companies award for its commendable performance in Malaysia, Indonesia and China.

=== Packaging ===
Jebsen & Jessen Packaging manufactures and supplies foam, plastic, paper, wood and integrated packaging products as well as molded foam components, engineered foam for construction and related design & engineering services.

=== Technology ===
Jebsen & Jessen Technology distributes industrial products, equipment and engineering solutions for sectures including infrasructure, manufacturing, utilities, marines and commercial operations. Its activities include equipment distribution, technical services and project support.
