= Canton of Vic-le-Comte =

Coordinates: 45.64°N 3.25°E

The canton of Vic-le-Comte is an administrative division of the Puy-de-Dôme department, central France. Its borders were modified at the French canton reorganisation which came into effect in March 2015. Its seat is in Vic-le-Comte.

It consists of the following communes:

1. Busséol
2. Chadeleuf
3. Coudes
4. Laps
5. Manglieu
6. Montpeyroux
7. Mirefleurs
8. Neschers
9. Parent
10. Pérignat-sur-Allier
11. Pignols
12. Plauzat
13. La Roche-Noire
14. Saint-Georges-sur-Allier
15. Saint-Maurice
16. Sallèdes
17. Sauvagnat-Sainte-Marthe
18. Vic-le-Comte
19. Yronde-et-Buron
