= IAPP =

IAPP may refer to:

== Science and technology ==
- Islet amyloid polypeptide, a protein produced by the pancreatic beta-cell that has been linked to type II diabetes
- Inter-Access Point Protocol (IEEE 802.11F), an optional extension to IEEE 802.11 that provides wireless access-point communications among multivendor systems
- iOS application or iApp

== Organisations ==
- International Association of Panoramic Photographers
- International Association of Privacy Professionals
- International Association of Parliamentarians for Peace
