= Laps, Puy-de-Dôme =

Laps
- Commune
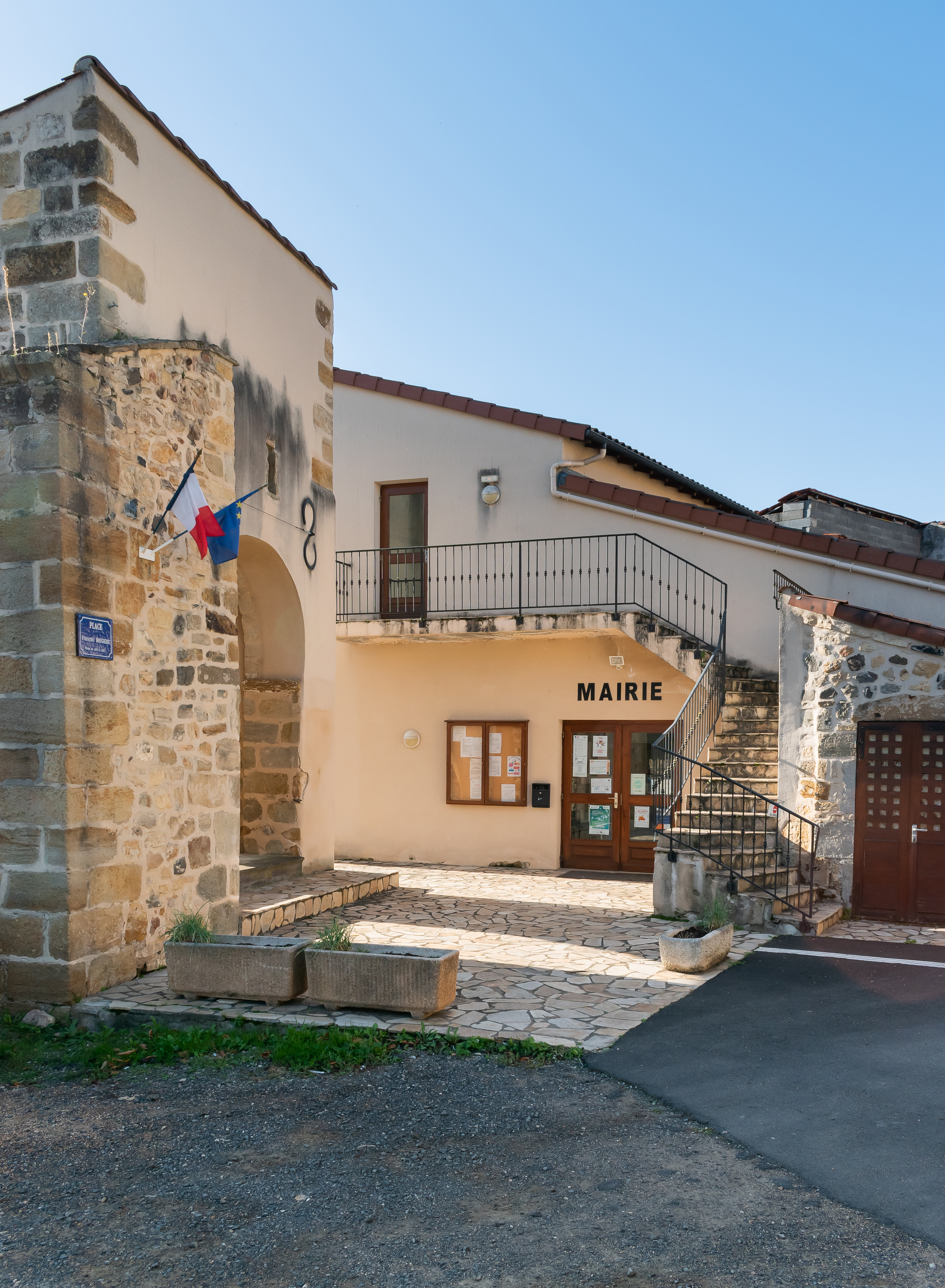
- Town hall of Laps
- Location of Laps
- Location within France Location within Auvergne-Rhône-Alpes
- Coordinates: 45°40′29″N 3°16′15″E
- Country: France
- Region: Auvergne-Rhône-Alpes
- Department: Puy-de-Dôme
- Arrondissement: Clermont-Ferrand
- Canton: Vic-le-Comte
- Intercommunality: Mond'Arverne Communauté

Government
  - Mayor (2020–2026): Philippe Chouvy
- Area^{1}: 7.09 km^{2} (2.74 sq mi)
- Elevation: 480 m (1,570 ft)
- Highest elevation: 724 m (2,375 ft)
- Lowest elevation: 394 m (1,293 ft)
- Population (2023): 601
  - Density: 84.8/km^{2} (220/sq mi)
- Time zone: UTC+01:00 (CET)
  - Summer (DST): UTC+02:00 (CEST)
- INSEE/Postal code: 63188 /63270
- ^{1} French Land Register data, which excludes lakes, ponds, glaciers > 1 km^{2} (0.386 sq mi or 247 acres) and river estuaries.

Laps is a commune in the Puy-de-Dôme department in Auvergne in central France.

== See also ==
- Communes of the Puy-de-Dôme department
