= Mirefleurs =

- Commune
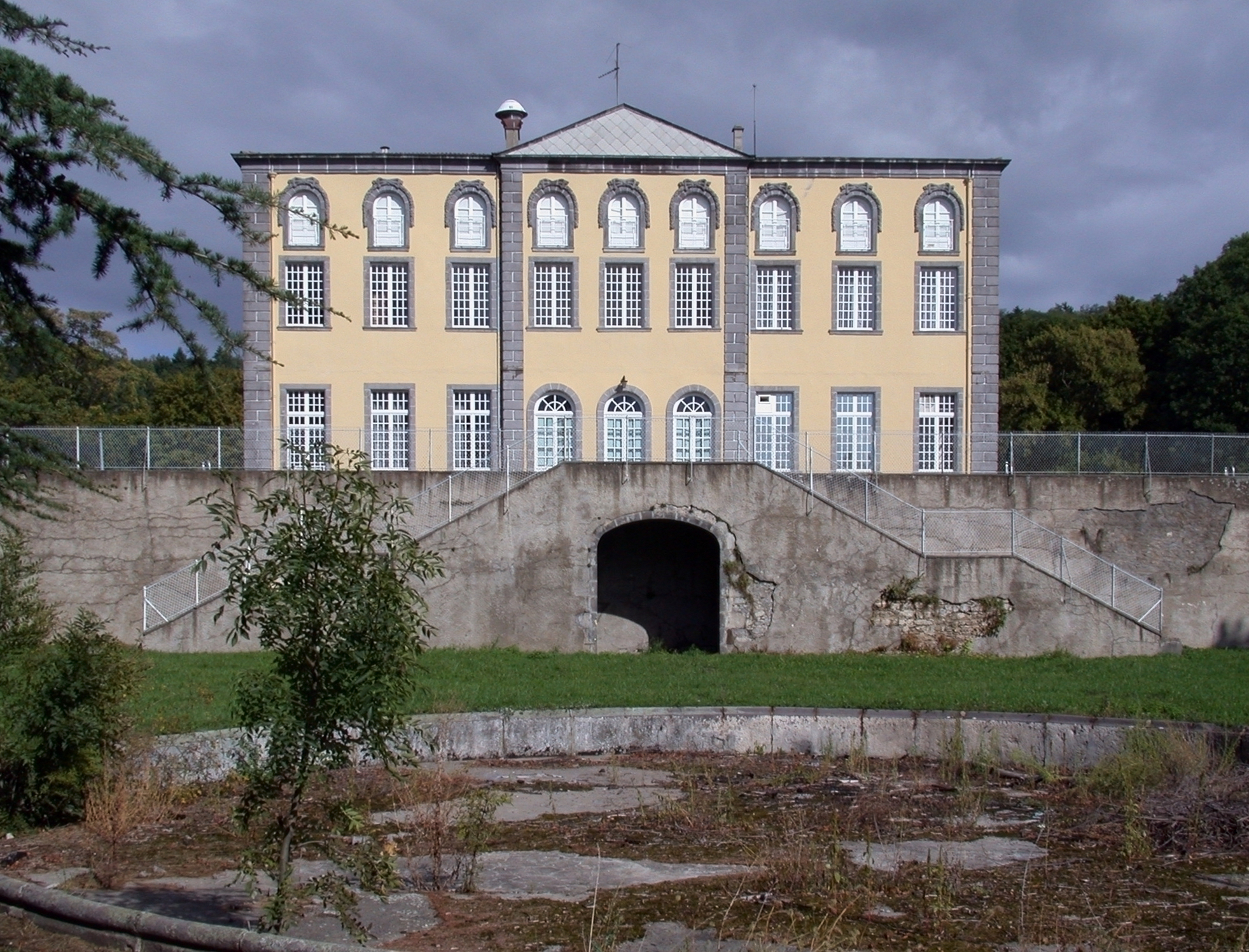
- The chateau of Chalendrat in Mirefleurs

- Coat of arms
- Location of Mirefleurs
- Location within France Location within Auvergne-Rhône-Alpes
- Coordinates: 45°41′38″N 3°13′28″E
- Country: France
- Region: Auvergne-Rhône-Alpes
- Department: Puy-de-Dôme
- Arrondissement: Clermont-Ferrand
- Canton: Vic-le-Comte
- Intercommunality: Mond'Arverne Communauté

Government
  - Mayor (2020–2026): Richard Véga
- Area^{1}: 9.05 km^{2} (3.49 sq mi)
- Elevation: 420 m (1,380 ft)
- Highest elevation: 781 m (2,562 ft)
- Lowest elevation: 326 m (1,070 ft)
- Population (2023): 2,373
  - Density: 262/km^{2} (679/sq mi)
- Time zone: UTC+01:00 (CET)
  - Summer (DST): UTC+02:00 (CEST)
- INSEE/Postal code: 63227 /63730
- ^{1} French Land Register data, which excludes lakes, ponds, glaciers > 1 km^{2} (0.386 sq mi or 247 acres) and river estuaries.

Mirefleurs is a commune in the Puy-de-Dôme department in Auvergne in central France.

== Population ==
Historical population
Year	Pop.	±% p.a.
1968	847	—
1975	1,053	+3.16%
1982	1,404	+4.20%
1990	1,708	+2.48%
1999	1,791	+0.53%
2007	2,161	+2.38%
2012	2,367	+1.84%
2017	2,436	+0.58%
2023	2,373	−0.44%
Source: INSEE

== See also ==
- Communes of the Puy-de-Dôme department
