= Ursula Ida Lapp =

German entrepreneur

- Born: Ursula Ida Emmelmann; 30 May 1930; Benshausen, Germany
- Died: 25 April 2021 (aged 90); Stuttgart, Germany
- Title: Founder of Lapp
- Spouse: Oskar Lapp (m. 1951)
- Awards: Order of Merit of the Federal Republic of Germany (1999)

Ursula Ida Lapp (née Emmelmann; 30 May 1930 – 25 April 2021) was a German entrepreneur who, together with her husband Oskar Lapp, founded the company Lapp.

== Early life and education ==
Ursula Ida Lapp was born in 1930, the daughter of carpenter Paul Emmelmann and his wife Anna. In 1946, she began commercial training at Mercedes-Bureau-Maschinen G.m.b.H. She married Oskar Lapp in 1951, and their first son Siegbert was born a year later.

After the family left Thuringia in 1955 and settled in Baden-Württemberg, Oskar Lapp developed the world's first industrially manufactured control cable. The Lapp couple began shipping the cables under the brand name Ölflex from a garage in Stuttgart-Vaihingen and the ground floor of their residential home. Subsequently, Oskar and Ursula Ida Lapp built up the sales and distribution of the new product together.

In 1959, Ursula Ida Lapp and her husband founded U.I. Lapp KG in Stuttgart, named after her. From the very beginning, Ursula Ida Lapp was responsible for bookkeeping, logistics, purchasing, and shipping.

Following the death of Oskar Lapp in 1987, Ursula Ida Lapp continued to run the company together with her sons, Siegbert and Andreas. Until her death, she served as Chairwoman of the Supervisory Board of Lapp Holding AG. She died in 2021. In the 2020/21 fiscal year, Lapp Holding reported a revenue of €1,423 million and employed 4,586 people globally.

== Public life and recognition ==
=== Ursula-Ida-Lapp Hall ===
Following a €600,000 contribution from the Lapp-Kabel company, the Möhringen community center (Bürgerhaus Möhringen) was built in March 2008. In return, Lapp-Kabel received the naming rights for the main community hall on the ground floor, which was named the Ursula-Ida-Lapp Hall (Ursula-Ida-Lapp-Saal).

=== Awards and honors ===
- Order of Merit of the Federal Republic of Germany (Verdienstkreuz am Bande): Awarded in December 1999 for her role in the economy and her regional political and social activities.
- Staufer Medal (de:Staufermedaille): Awarded on 17 June 2010 by Stefan Mappus, the Minister-President of Baden-Württemberg, recognizing her public and regional services.
- Business Medal of the State of Baden-Württemberg (de:Wirtschaftsmedaille des Landes Baden-Württemberg): Awarded on 23 November 2017 by Nicole Hoffmeister-Kraut, the Minister of Economic Affairs, at the New Palace, Stuttgart, honoring her lifetime entrepreneurial achievements.
