= La Roche-Noire =

- Commune
- Coat of arms
- Location of La Roche-Noire
- Location within France Location within Auvergne-Rhône-Alpes
- Coordinates: 45°42′29″N 3°13′30″E
- Country: France
- Region: Auvergne-Rhône-Alpes
- Department: Puy-de-Dôme
- Arrondissement: Clermont-Ferrand
- Canton: Vic-le-Comte

Government
  - Mayor (2026–32): Pascal Bruhat
- Area^{1}: 3.07 km^{2} (1.19 sq mi)
- Elevation: 410 m (1,350 ft)
- Highest elevation: 551 m (1,808 ft)
- Lowest elevation: 315 m (1,033 ft)
- Population (2023): 631
  - Density: 206/km^{2} (532/sq mi)
- Time zone: UTC+01:00 (CET)
  - Summer (DST): UTC+02:00 (CEST)
- INSEE/Postal code: 63306 /63800
- ^{1} French Land Register data, which excludes lakes, ponds, glaciers > 1 km^{2} (0.386 sq mi or 247 acres) and river estuaries.

La Roche-Noire (French pronunciation: [la ʁɔʃ nwaʁ]; Occitan: La Ròcha Nèira) is a commune in the Puy-de-Dôme department in Auvergne-Rhône-Alpes in central France.

== See also ==
- Communes of the Puy-de-Dôme department
