= Lapiwala =

- Village
- Location within Pakistan
- Coordinates: 31.27°N 71.3°E
- Country: Pakistan
- Province: Punjab
- Elevation: 164 m (538 ft)
- Time zone: UTC+5 (PST)

Lapiwala is a small town in Bhakkar District in the Punjab province of Pakistan. It is at 31°27'50N 71°3'45E with an altitude of 164 metres (538 ft) and lies south of the district capital, Bhakkar. Lapiwala is known for its orange production.
