= LAPLander =

Space probe

LAPLander (short for a light airbag-protected lander) is a prototype of a space probe primarily intended for measurements in the ionosphere. The prototype aims to evaluate the flight characteristics, e.g. air braking, of a flight from the border of space. Furthermore, the impact protection and recovery systems will be evaluated. As the name says, the recovery system is based on airbags, that serve both deceleration and impact protection. The future version of LAPLander will make it possible to do multi-point measurements, which will be of great help in the research of the complex processes within the ionosphere that contributes to auroras and disturbances in satellite communication.

== Rexus flight ==
Laplander is selected for the REXUS/BEXUS program and was launched on a sounding rocket flight from Esrange Space Center (outside Kiruna) in March 2010. The rocket is unguided, spin-stabilized, and powered by an Improved Orion motor, which is capable to bring the payload to an apogee of 100 km, which is the border to space. The event is sponsored by the Swedish National Space Agency (SNSA) and the German Space Agency (DLR), in cooperation with the European Space Agency (ESA).

== Flight characteristics ==
To reconstruct the flight, LAPLander will record the following parameters:

- Three-axis acceleration
- Three-axis rotation rate
- Three-component magnetic field
- Temperature (for various parts of the payload)
- Raw GPS data

The latter is provided a cooperation with Cornell University, New York, United States. The device to be used is a novel miniature GPS, that in contrast to a common GPS can determine the attitude. This is made by measuring the phase difference from the GPS signal between two antennas.

== Development ==
The development of LAPlander started in 2008 and took place at the Alfvén Laboratory, Royal Institute of Technology in Stockholm.

=== The LAPLander team ===
The team behind this project consists of:

Overall issues:

- Dr. Nickolay Ivchenko, supervisor, Sweden
- Torbjörn Sundberg, team leader, Ph.D. student, Sweden

Mechanical and aerodynamical issues:

- Matias Wartelski, MSc aerospace engineering student, Spain
- Christian Westlund, MSc aerospace engineering student, Sweden
- Li Xin, MSc aerospace engineering student, China
- Erik Sund, MSc aerospace engineering student, Sweden
- Patrtik Ahlen, MSc aerospace engineering student, Sweden

Electrical issues:

- Malin Gustafsson, MSc electrical engineering student, Sweden
- Joakim Sandström, MSc electrical engineering student, Sweden
- Oliver Neuner, MSc electro physics student, Germany
- Christian Jonsson, MSc mechatronics engineering student, Sweden
- Johan Juhlén, MSc mechatronics engineering student, Sweden
- Johan Thelander, MSc mechatronics engineering student, Sweden
- Mattias Hedberg, MSc mechatronics engineering student, Sweden

== See also ==
- Space probe
