= UAP =

UAP, uap, or Uap commonly refers to:

- Unidentified aerial/anomalous phenomenon, an expanded definition of the term "unidentified flying object"

UAP, uap, or Uap may also refer to:

== People ==
- Unlicensed assistive personnel, paraprofessionals who assist with bedside care

== Places ==
- Yap, an island group in the Federated States of Micronesia

=== Facilities and structures ===
- Tour UAP, an office skyscraper in La Défense, Paris

== Computing ==
- Uniform access principle, a computer programming principle
- User Account Protection, in Microsoft Windows Vista
- User Agent Profiling, capturing capability and preference information for wireless devices

== Education ==
- Universidad Adventista del Plata, Argentina
- Universidad Alas Peruanas, Peru
- University of Agriculture, Peshawar, Pakistan
- University of Alabama Press, United States
- University of Asia and the Pacific, Philippines
- University of Asia Pacific, Bangladesh

== Science ==
- Ununited anconeal process, a common cause of elbow dysplasia in dogs

== Organizations ==
- United American Patriots, an American nonprofit organization
- United Architects of the Philippines, the professional organization for architects in the Philippines
- Urban Art Projects, an Australian art fabricator
- United Australia Party, a former Australian political party (1931–1945)
- United Australia Party (2013), a political party in Australia
