= Integrated Applications Promotion =

ARTES 20 Integrated Applications Promotion (IAP) was a European Space Agency programme that supported the development of services utilizing space assets, such as satellite navigation, communication or earth observation, with terrestrial systems. Many successful projects and studies created user-driven applications around solving particular problems or opportunities instead of creating technological solutions.

Integrated Applications Promotion Programme was approved on ESA ministerial conference in November 2008 as a new branch of the Advanced Research in Telecommunications Systems programme. The ambassadors platform was initiated in May 2010 aiming to further expand awareness of the programme in Eastern and Central Europe. Even after its restructuring, ESA IAP supported over 2,000 projects to deliver across over 100 socio-economic goals and SDG indicator.

== Activities ==
IAP programme was divided between three types of activities:

=== Open Competitions ===
Standard procedure of placing contracts with ESA focused on particular ESA's needs or collaborating institutions while working with a fixed budget and time schedule. Projects cover Feasibility Studies and Demonstrations.

=== Calls for Proposals ===
Projects working with no fixed budget or closing date co-funded by ESA up to 50% in case of commercial applications and up to 100% in case of research institutions and universities. Calls of Proposals are divided into 3 major categories.

- Feasibility Studies for identification, analyzation and a definition of sustainable applications and services by utilization of a multiple space data.
- Fast Track Feasibility Studies are focusing on a few selected critical elements of a feasibility studies while being limited in funding and duration.
- Demonstration Projects for pre-operational services with commercial and environmental stainability perspective and access to private funding.

=== Awareness Activities ===
Special awards on selected topics and a calls for ideas including these opetoor everyone interested, with no additional requirements.

== See also ==
- ARTES
- European Centre for Space Applications and Telecommunications (ECSAT)
