= IAP =

IAP may refer to:

== Medicine ==
- Intra-abdominal pressure

== Organizations ==
- Adventist Church of Promise (Portuguese: Igreja Adventista da Promessa), evangelical Christian church based in Brazil
- Fraunhofer Institute for Applied Polymer Research, a German institute operated by the Fraunhofer Society
- Independent American Party of Nevada, the Nevada Constitution Party affiliate
- Information Age Publishing, American academic publisher in Charlotte, North Carolina
- Institut d'astrophysique de Paris (Paris Astrophysical Institute), a French scientific organization
- Institution of Analysts and Programmers, an international institution for professions involved in the analysis, development and testing of software
- Integrated Applications Promotion, a European Space Agency programme for developing applications of space-based technology
- InterAcademy Panel, an international organization for cooperation of science academies
- International Academy of Pathology, an international organization dedicated to the advancement of Pathology through educational exchanges worldwide.
- International Association of Prosecutors, a non-governmental organisation established by the United Nations in 1995
- Irish Academic Press, independent Irish academic publisher based in Newbridge, County Kildare
- Islamic Association of Palestine, a defunct Islamic fund-raising organization
- Italian African Police (Polizia dell'Africa Italiana), the police force of Italian-controlled areas in Africa in 1936-1941

== Science and technology ==
- Identical ancestors point, a point in time in the past where every living member of a species at that time is either an ancestor to all living of that species or none living
- Identity-Aware Proxy, part of the Google Cloud Platform, that uses identity and context to guard access to your applications and VMs
- Imaging atom probe
- In-app purchase, a way of purchasing virtual goods in mobile applications
- In-application programming, a way to program computer logic devices while they are being operated by the system
- Indanylaminopropane, an uncommon psychoactive chemical sometimes compared to MDMA
- Index of air purity, a measure of air quality
- Inhibitor of apoptosis, a protein family involved in the suppression of programmed cell death (apoptosis)
- Integrated automation platform
- Integrin Associated Protein or CD47 protein
- Internet access provider, also known as an Internet service provider
- Intrapartum antibiotic prophylaxis, for Group B streptococcal infection
- IPTV Application Platform, an IPTV application platform from Ericsson
- Indoor Air Pollution Indoor air quality
- Intracisternal A particle, a retrotransposable element subfamily linked to epigenetic variability

== Transportation ==
- Instrument approach procedure, a published procedure for the final approach for landing at an airport under instrument flight rules
- International airport

== Other uses ==
- Independent Activities Period, held at MIT every year immediately after winter vacation
- The Italian Asphalt & Pavement Company, a former name of the American musical group The Duprees

== See also ==
- IAPS (disambiguation)
