= Lapland =

Lapland may refer to:

== Places ==
=== Northern Europe ===
- Lapland (Finland), a region in Finland
- Lapland (Sweden), a Swedish province
- Sápmi, the Sámi homeland spanning across several countries in northern Scandinavia
- Lappmarken, the historic region of Sweden (including Finland) inhabited by the Sámi
- Lapland (historical province of Finland)
- Lapland (former province of Finland), a province of Finland 1938–2009
- Lapland (parliamentary electoral district), an electoral district in Finland
- Norwegian Lapland, a name sometimes used for Northern Norway or parts of it
- Russian Lapland, a name sometimes used for Murmansk Oblast
- Laplandiya (lit. 'Lapland'), a rural locality (a railway station) in Murmansk Oblast, Russia
- Lapland Biosphere Reserve, Murmansk Oblast, Russia

=== North America ===
- Lapland, Indiana, a town in the United States
- Lapland, Kansas, an unincorporated community in the United States
- Lapland, Nova Scotia, a community in Lunenburg district, Nova Scotia, Canada

== Television, film, and music ==
- Lapland, the former name of the BBC television series now titled Being Eileen
- Lapland (album), a 2005 album by Craig Wedren
- "Lapland", a song on the 2004 album Ratatat by Ratatat
- "Lapland (Lappi)", a suite on the 1997 album Angels Fall First by Nightwish
- Lapland (film), a 1957 Disney film directed by Ben Sharpsteen

== Other ==
- SS Lapland, a large ocean liner of the Red Star Line that served from 1908 to 1934

== See also ==
- Lappland (disambiguation)
- Land (disambiguation)
- Lap (disambiguation)
- North Calotte – Regions of Norway, Sweden, and Finland located north of the Arctic Circle
