= Oskar Lapp =

German inventor and entrepreneur

Oskar Lapp (20 March 1921 – 25 April 1987) was a German entrepreneur and inventor. Together with his wife Ursula Ida Lapp, he founded the U.I. Lapp KG (today U.I. Lapp GmbH, also known as Lapp Holding) in Stuttgart in 1959. Today, Lapp Holding is a globally active company in the field of cable technology with about 5,700 employees and approximately 1.9 billion euros in revenue (2024/2025).

== Early life ==
Oskar Lapp was born on 20 March 1921 in Benshausen, Thuringia. Initially trained as a machinist and mechanic, Lapp joined his parents' company which produced valves. After World War II and five years of Soviet prisoner of war captivity, he studied mechanical engineering at the University of Applied Sciences in Schmalkalden from 1949 to 1952.

In 1951, he married Ursula Ida Emmelmann. In 1955, the family left Thuringia, at that time part of the German Democratic Republic - East Germany - and relocated to Baden-Württemberg in West Germany. In 1958, they moved into a house in Stuttgart-Vaihingen, which shortly thereafter the family home became the first company headquarters of U.I. Lapp KG.

== Career ==
After moving to West Germany, Lapp initially worked as an engineer at the Harting company. In 1958, he invented the world's first color coded control cable. The product later became known under the brand name Ölflex, named so for being oil-resistant and flexible. Before this invention, individual cores were inserted into tubes. Since all components were black, assigning the corresponding cable ends was very labor-intensive. By inventing color coding for individual cores, this effort was significantly reduced. His company was the first to offer preassembled cable harnesses in the customer’s desired length. In 1959, he founded U.I. Lapp KG together with his wife. The company's name is taken from his wife's initials, and who was listed as the company's founder, since at the time Oskar Lapp was still employed by another company. In the following years, the company grew continuously into the current international enterprise.

== Honors ==
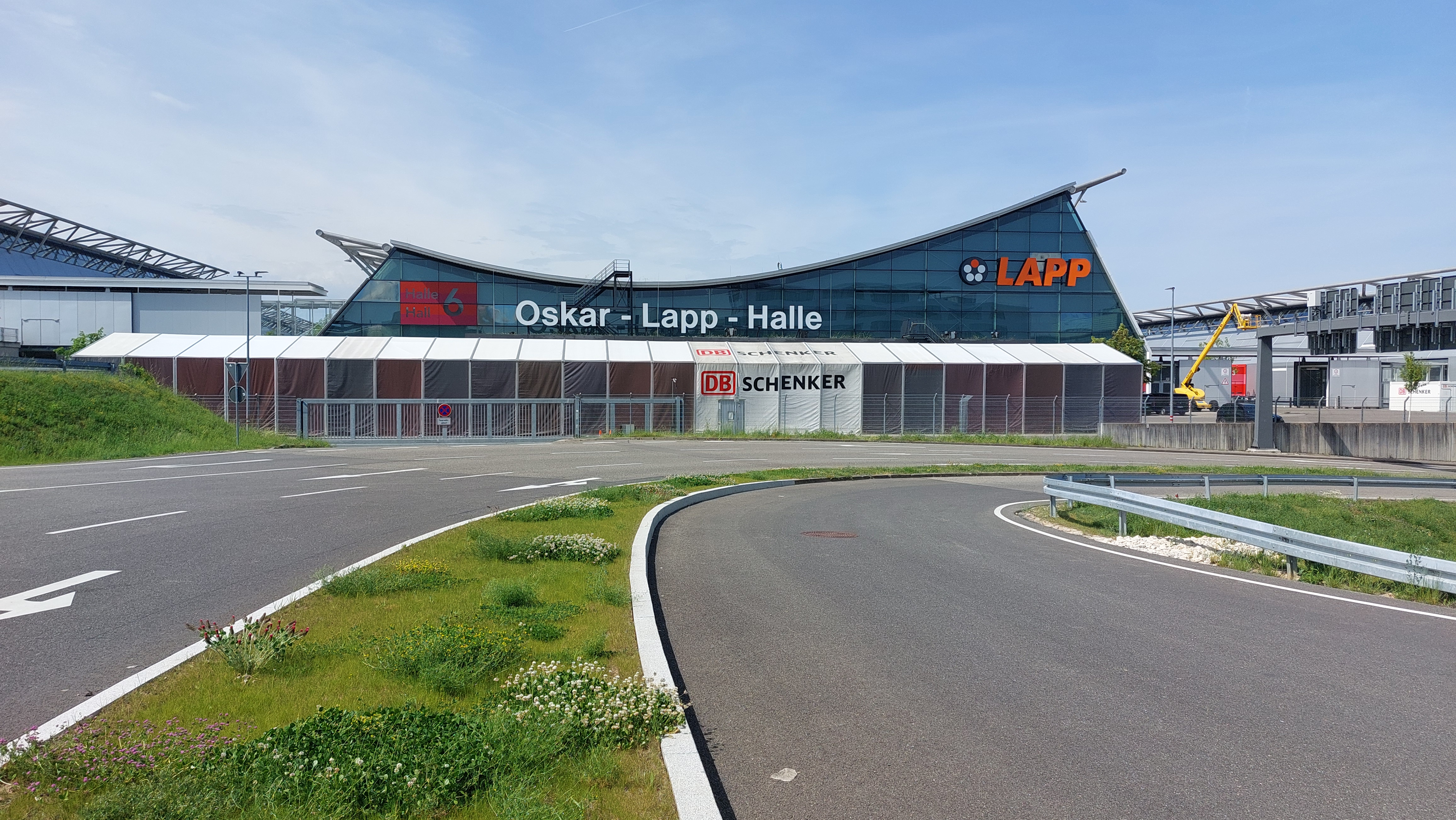
The Oskar Lapp Hall, Messe Stuttgart

For his extensive activities in the public interest, for example in the German-South African Society or the Stuttgart Monument Foundation, Oskar Lapp was awarded the Federal Cross of Merit on ribbon in 1981. He died in 1987 of a heart condition. In 1992, the family founded the Oskar Lapp Foundation in his memory, which supports research on heart diseases. In 2004, the city of Stuttgart honored the entrepreneur by naming a street after him. Since 2007, a hall at Messe Stuttgart bears his name.

== Publications ==
- Oskar Lapp: Die Verteilung elektrischer Energie, Anwendung der Lichtwellentechnik. Idee und Federführung Oskar Lapp. Red.: Heinz Weidner, Werner Greue. O. Lapp, Stuttgart 1985, (608 S.).OCLC 721386812

Oskar Lapp is credited as an editor of a history of his family's links to Benshausen, published after his death.
