= Robert of Auvergne (disambiguation) =

Robert of Auvergne (died 1234) was the bishop of Clermont, archbishop of Lyon and a troubadour.

Robert of Auvergne or Robert d'Auvergne may also refer to:

- Several viscounts of Auvergne
  - Robert I, Viscount of Auvergne (10th century)
  - Robert II, Viscount of Auvergne (10th century)
  - Robert III, Viscount of Auvergne (10th century)
- Several counts of Auvergne
  - Robert I of Auvergne (11th century)
  - Robert II of Auvergne (11th century)
  - Robert III of Auvergne (12th century)
  - Robert IV of Auvergne (died 1194)
  - Robert V of Auvergne (died 1277)
  - Robert VI of Auvergne (died 1314)
  - Robert VII of Auvergne (died 1324/5)
- Several dauphins of Auvergne
  - Robert I, Dauphin of Auvergne (died 1262)
  - Robert II, Dauphin of Auvergne (died 1282)
  - Robert III, Dauphin of Auvergne (died 1324)
- Robert Dauphin d'Auvergne (died 1462), bishop elect of Chartres and Albi

== See also ==
- Dalfi d'Alvernha, sometimes called Robert
