= List of rulers of Auvergne =

This is a list of the various rulers of Auvergne.

== History ==
In the 7th century, Auvergne was disputed between the Franks and Aquitanians. It was later conquered by the Carolingians, and was integrated for a time into the kingdom of Aquitaine. The counts of Auvergne slowly became autonomous.

In the 10th century, Auvergne became a disputed territory between the count of Poitiers and the counts of Toulouse.

In the Middle Ages, Auvergne was broken into four feudal domains:

- the county of Auvergne (created around 980)
- the bishopric of Clermont or ecclesiastical county of Clermont (created around 980 as a sort of counter-power)
- the dauphinate of Auvergne or the worldly county of Clermont (formed around 1155 after a coup but not formally created until 1302)
- the duchy of Auvergne or the land of Auvergne (formed from the royal domain of Auvergne in 1360)

Auvergne was integrated in turn into the appanages of Alphonse, count of Poitou and Toulouse (1241–1271) and of John, duke of Berry and Auvergne and count of Poitiers and Montpensier (1360–1416).

During the Hundred Years' War, Auvergne faced numerous raids and revolts, including the Tuchin Revolt.

In 1434 the Duchy of Auvergne passed to the House of Bourbon.

Quite contemporaneously, the County of Auvergne passed to the House of La Tour d'Auvergne, and upon its extinction in 1531 it passed to Catherine de' Medici before becoming a royal domain.

In 1436, the Dauphinate of Auvergne passed to the House of Bourbon-Montpensier.

== Elected Counts of Auvergne (480–963) ==
Coat of arms of the counts and dukes of Auvergne.

=== Visigoth period ===
- Victorius (480–489)
- Apollinaris (489-515)

=== Frankish Merovingian period ===
- Hortensius (516-532)
- Sigivald (532)
- Becco (533)
- Hortensius (533-?)
- Evodius ?
- Georgius ?
- Britianus ?
- Firminus (c. 555 or 558, deposed)
- Sallustus (duke c. 555 or 558–560)
- Firminus (restored, 560–571)
- Venerandus (before 585)
- Nicetius I (duke and count c. 585)
- Nicetius II (c. 585)
- Eulalius (duke 585–590)
  - part of Austrasia (592–595)
  - part of Burgundy (595–613)
  - part of Austrasia (612–639)
- Bobon of Neustria (639–656)
- Hector of Neustria (c. 655–675)
- Bodilon of Austrasia (c. 675)
- Calminius of Neustria (c. 670s)
- Genesius (c. 680s)
- Haribert of Neustria (c. 690s)
  - part of Neustria until 751

=== Frankish Carolingian period ===
- Ithier (c. 758)
- Blandin (760–763)
- Chilping (763–765)
- Bertmond (765–778)
- Icterius (778–?)
- Warin I (818-c.820)
- Warin II (c.820–839), son of previous
- Gerard (839–841), supposed brother of previous
- William I (841–846)
- Bernard I (846–868)
- Bernard II Plantapilosa (864–886), married Ermengard, daughter of, Bernard I
- William II the Pious (886–918), son of Bernard II, also duke of Aquitaine.
- William III the Younger (restored, 918–926), son of Adelinda, daughter of Bernard Plantapilosa, also duke of Aquitaine.
- Acfred of Aquitaine (926–927), brother of previous.

After the death of Acfred, who left the comital fisc completely diminished, there appeared no successor who could control the entire Auvergne, with Velay. Several relatives of surrounding regions made claims. Below are the dates of their effective control.

- Ebalus Manzer (927–934), great-grandson of Gerard
- Raymond Pons, Count of Toulouse (934–942)
- Raymond, Count of Toulouse (942–961)
- William (IV) (961–963), son of Ebalus Manzer, also Duke of Aquitaine.

== Hereditary Counts of Auvergne and the Dauphinate (963-1653/1693) ==
=== House of Auvergne ===
The viscounty of Clermont, then vassal to the elective county of Auvergne, came the so-called House of Auvergne, a designation used by modern historians for the family that ruled consistently the Auvergne region from 963. After a period of comital vacancy, the viscounts of Clermont were elevated as successors of the elective counts: the county became hereditary.

==== Viscounts of Clermont ====
- Armand of Clermont (?–?)
- Robert I of Clermont (?–?)
- Robert II of Clermont (?–?)
- Robert III of Clermont (?–?), son of Robert II

==== The splitting of the county and the Dauphinate ====
Coat of arms of the dauphins of Auvergne.

In 1155, count William VII the Young was usurped by his uncle, count William VIII the Old. However, William VIII left a smaller portion for his nephew to rule. In 1209, the county of William VIII the Old would be made smaller after a partial confiscation by Philip II of France, later to be made in 1360 as the Duchy of Auvergne.

As for William VII the Young, he was able to maintain his status in part of his county, especially Beaumont, Chamalières, and Montferrand. From this smaller county raised, in 1302, the Dauphinate of Auvergne.

Based in the fact that William VII's wife was the daughter of the dauphin de Viennois, Guigues IV, and that William VII's descendants, in virtue of the Viennois blood, used the surname Dauphin, the majority of authors anticipate the formalization of the dauphinate in 1302 and choose to call William VII and his successors already as dauphins of Auvergne, for a clear distinction from the descendants of William VIII. Still others, out of convenience, choose to call these successors the counts-dauphins of Auvergne.

==== Partitions of Auvergne under Auvergne family ====
County of Auvergne (963-1169)
		Younger County of Auvergne (1169-1302); Raised to: Dauphinate of Auvergne (1302–1436)
Part of the county annexed to France (1209); In 1360, emerged here the Duchy of Auvergne	Elder County of Auvergne (1169-1437)	Younger County of Auvergne (1169-1302); Raised to: Dauphinate of Auvergne (1302–1436)
Part of the county annexed to France (1209); In 1360, emerged here the Duchy of Auvergne	Inherited by La Tour d'Auvergne	Inherited by Bourbon

==== Table of rulers ====
Note: The parallel existence of the usurpers of the Elder County of Auvergne and of the usurped Younger County-Dauphinate, who often carried the same first names, also complicates things. To avoid confusion, the numbering system used here is continuous, and Dauphin is used as part of the name where applicable.

Monarch	Born	Reign	Ruling part	Consort	Death	Notes
Guy I	c.950? Second son of Robert II, Viscount of Clermont and Ingelberga	980-989	County of Auvergne	Ausenda no children	989 aged 38-39?	He was the first of the family to use the comital title in Auvergne. However, he left no descendants and was succeeded by his brother.
William IV	c.950? Third son of Robert II, Viscount of Clermont and Ingelberga	989-1016	County of Auvergne	Humberge de Brioude five children	1016 aged 65-66?	
Robert I	c.970? First son of William IV and Humberge de Brioude	1016-1032	County of Auvergne	Unknown or Ermengarde-Philippa(?) two children	1032 aged 51-52?	
William V	c.1000 Only son of Robert I	1032-1064	County of Auvergne	Philippa of Gévaudan five children	1064 aged 63-64?	
Robert II	c.1030? First son of William V and Philippa of Gévaudan	1064-1095	County of Auvergne	Bertha of Rouergue; 1051 no children Judith de Melgueil c.1069 two children	c.1095 aged 64-65?	
William VI	c.1069 Son of Robert II and Judith de Melgueil	1095 – 25 January 1136	County of Auvergne	Emma of Sicily; 1092 two children	25 January 1136 aged 66-67	
Robert III	c.1092? First son of William VI and Emma of Sicily	25 January 1136 – 1147	County of Auvergne	Unknown one child	1147; Palestine aged 51-52?	
William VII the Young	1102? Only son of Robert III	1147-1155	County of Auvergne	Marquise of Albon; 1150 four children	1169 aged 66-67?	In 1155, William VIII robbed William VII a great part of Auvergne.
William VII the Young	1102? Only son of Robert III	1155-1169	Younger County of Auvergne	Marquise of Albon; 1150 four children	1169 aged 66-67?	In 1155, William VIII robbed William VII a great part of Auvergne.
William VIII the Old	c.1100? Second son of William VI and Emma of Sicily	1155-1182	Elder County of Auvergne	Anne of Nevers four children	1182 aged 81-82?	In 1155, William VIII robbed William VII a great part of Auvergne.
Robert IV Dauphin	c.1150 First son of William VII and Marquise of Albon	1169 – 22 May 1235	Younger County of Auvergne	Guillemette de Comborn (d.May 1199); 1150 four children	22 May 1235 aged 84-85?	Held the surname Dauphin, after the title of his mother's family.
Robert IV	c.1130 Son of William VIII and Anne of Nevers	1182-1194	Elder County of Auvergne	Matilda of Burgundy; 1165 six children	1194 aged 81-82?	
William IX	c.1150 First son of Robert IV and Matilda of Burgundy	1194-1199	Elder County of Auvergne	Unmarried	1199 aged 48-49?	
Guy II	c.1165 Second son of Robert IV and Matilda of Burgundy	1199-1222	Elder County of Auvergne	Petronilla of Chambon; 1180 eight children	1222 aged 81-82?	
William X	c.1195 First son of Guy II and Petronilla of Chambon	1222-1246	Elder County of Auvergne	Adelaide of Brabant; 23 May 1225 six children	1246 aged 81-82?	His wife was elected to succeed to the County of Boulogne, which then passed to her sons.
William VIII Dauphin	c.1175 First son of Robert IV Dauphin and Guillemette de Comborn	22 May 1235 – 19 November 1240	Younger County of Auvergne	Huguette de Chamalières; 1196 one child Isabelle de Montluçon one child Philippa de Baffie no children	19 November 1240 aged 74-75?	
Robert V Dauphin	c.1200 Only son of William VIII Dauphin and Huguette de Chamalières	19 November 1240 – 12 April 1262	Younger County of Auvergne	Alix de Ventadour (d.c.1250) c.1230 six children	12 April 1262 aged 61-62	
Robert V	c.1225 Son of William X and Adelaide of Brabant	1246 – 17 January 1277	Elder County of Auvergne (with County of Boulogne)	Éléonore de Baffie; 1245 six children	17 January 1277 aged 51-52	Also Count of Boulogne. From his reign, the remaining counts of Auvergne also had possession over the county of Boulogne.
Robert VI Dauphin	c.1238 First son of Robert V Dauphin and Alix de Ventadour	12 April 1262 – 21 March 1282	Younger County of Auvergne	Matilda of Elder Auvergne (1230- 21 August 1280) c.1250 five children	21 March 1282 aged 43-44	
William XI	1248; First son of Robert V and Éléonore de Baffie	17 January 1277 – 1277	Elder County of Auvergne (with County of Boulogne)	Unmarried	1277 aged 31-32	
Robert VI	1250; Second son of Robert V and Éléonore de Baffie	1277-1317	Elder County of Auvergne (with County of Boulogne)	Beatrice of Montgascon; 14 June 1279; Luzillat six children	1317 aged 66-67	
Robert VII Dauphin	c.1255 First son of Robert VI Dauphin and Matilda of Elder Auvergne	21 March 1282 – 19 May 1324	Younger County of Auvergne (until 1302) Dauphinate of Auvergne (from 1302)	Alixente de Mercoeur (d.15 July 1286); 1279 four children Isabelle de Jaligny (d.1 October 1297); 1289 four children	19 May 1324 aged 68-69	During his reign the county was elevated to a dauphinate.
Robert VII	1282; Son of Robert VI and Beatrice of Montgascon	1317 – 13 October 1325	Elder County of Auvergne (with County of Boulogne)	Blanche of Bourbon (d.1304); 25 June 1303; Paris one child Marie of Termonde (de Dampierre); 1312 one child	13 October 1325 aged 81-82?	
John	c.1280 First son of Robert VII Dauphin and Alixente de Mercoeur	19 Mary 1324 – 10 March 1351	Dauphinate of Auvergne	Anne de Poitiers-Valentinois (1289-17 August 1351); 27 May 1313 three children	10 March 1351 aged 70-71	Inherited also his mother's lordship of Mercoeur.
William XII	1303; Son of Robert VII and Blanche of Bourbon	13 October 1325 – 6 August 1332	Elder County of Auvergne (with County of Boulogne)	Margaret of Évreux; 1325; Busséol one child	6 August 1332 aged 28-29	Children of Robert VII, divided the inheritance: William received the core county, and Godfrey the lordships of Montgascon and Roche-Savine.
Godfrey	c.1315? Second son of Robert VII and Marie of Termonde	13 October 1325 – 1387	Elder County of Auvergne (at Montgascon and Roche-Savine)	Margaret of Younger Auvergne; 1364 no children Jeanne de Ventadour; 1375 one child Blanche de Senlis; 1376 no children	1387 aged 71-72?	Children of Robert VII, divided the inheritance: William received the core county, and Godfrey the lordships of Montgascon and Roche-Savine.
Regency of Margaret of Évreux (1332–1338)						In virtue of her second marriage she became queen of France.
Joanna I	8 May 1326; Only daughter of William XII and Margaret of Évreux	6 August 1332 – 29 September 1360	Elder County of Auvergne (with County of Boulogne)	Philip, heir of Burgundy; November 1338; Vincennes three children John II of France; 9 February 1350; Château de Sainte-Gemme two children	29 September 1360 aged 34	In virtue of her second marriage she became queen of France.
Béraud I	c.1315 First son of John and Marquise of Albon	10 March 1351 – 27 August 1356	Dauphinate of Auvergne	Marie de Villemur (1315-28 September 1338); 14 March 1333; Avignon nine children	27 August 1356 aged 40-41	
Béraud II the Great	1333; First son of Béraud I and Marie de Villemur	27 August 1356 – 17 January 1399	Dauphinate of Auvergne	Joanna of Forez; 22 June 1357 one child Joanna of Elder Auvergne (d.1 October 1373); June 1371 no children Margaret, Countess of Sancerre; 27 June 1374; Riom eight children	17 January 1399 aged 65-66	
Philip of Rouvres	1346; Rouvres-en-Plaine; Son of Philip, heir of Burgundy and Joanna I	29 September 1360 – 21 November 1361	Elder County of Auvergne (with County of Boulogne)	Margaret III, Countess of Flanders; 1355 no children	21 November 1361; Rouvres-en-Plaine aged 14-15	From the Ducal/Capetian House of Burgundy. Left no descendants after a very short reign, and the county went to another son of Robert VII.
John I	c.1310? First son of Robert VII and Marie of Termonde	21 November 1361 – 24 March 1386	Elder County of Auvergne (with County of Boulogne)	Joanna of Clermont; 1328 three children	24 March 1386; Compiègne aged 39-40	
John II	c.1330 Son of John I and Joanna of Clermont	24 March 1386 – 28 September 1404	Elder County of Auvergne (with County of Boulogne)	Aliénor of Comminges; 11 August 1373 one child	28 September 1404 aged 73-74?	
Béraud III	1380; Ardres; First son of Béraud II and Margaret, Countess of Sancerre	17 January 1399 – 28 July 1426	Dauphinate of Auvergne	Jeanne de La Tour (d.1415); 1409 one child Marguerite de Chauvigny (d.23 July 1473); 14 July 1426; Issodoun no children	28 July 1426; Ardres aged 45-46	Children of Beraud II, both titled Dauphin/Dauphine, inherited separately their possessions: Anne inherited her deceased maternal uncle's possessions of Forez in 1372, as Dauphine de Forez. After her death this part was inherited by the Bourbons.; Beraud inherited, after their father's death in 1399, the Dauphinate itself, plus the county of Sancerre from his mother.
Anne	1358; Only daughter of Béraud II and Joanna of Forez	15 May 1372 – 22 September 1417	Dauphinate of Auvergne (at Forez)	Louis II, Duke of Bourbon; 19 August 1371 four children	22 September 1417; Cleppé aged 58-59	Children of Beraud II, both titled Dauphin/Dauphine, inherited separately their possessions: Anne inherited her deceased maternal uncle's possessions of Forez in 1372, as Dauphine de Forez. After her death this part was inherited by the Bourbons.; Beraud inherited, after their father's death in 1399, the Dauphinate itself, plus the county of Sancerre from his mother.
Dauphinate of Forez inherited by Bourbon
Joanna II	1378; Daughter of John II and Aliénor of Comminges	28 September 1404 – 1424	Elder County of Auvergne (with County of Boulogne)	John, Duke of Berry; 5 June 1390; Puy-de-Dôme no children Georges de La Trémoille; 16 November 1416; Puy-de-Dôme no children	1424 aged 45-46	Ruled alongside her husbands.
Maria	September 1376; Daughter of Godfrey and Jeanne de Ventadour	1387-1424 1424 – 7 August 1437	Elder County of Auvergne (at Montgascon and Roche-Savine until 1424; in all Auvergne and Boulogne from 1424)	Bertrand IV of La Tour; 1389 four children	7 August 1437 aged 60	
Elder Auvergne inherited by La Tour d'Auvergne
Joanna	1414; Only daughter of Béraud III and Jeanne de La Tour	28 July 1426 – 26 May 1436	Dauphinate of Auvergne	Louis I, Count of Montpensier; 8 December 1426 no children	26 May 1436; Ardres aged 21-22	Heiress of her father and last of her family, her possessions were inherited by the Montpensier branch of the House of Bourbon.
Dauphinate of Auvergne inherited by Bourbon-Montpensier

=== The successors of the Auvergne family in the county and the dauphinate ===
County of Auvergne	Dauphinate of Auvergne
Bertrand V of La Tour (1437–1461), son of Marie I; Bertrand VI of La Tour (1461–1494), son of Bertrand V; John III (1494–1501), son of Bertrand VI; Anne de La Tour d'Auvergne (1501–1524), daughter of John III; Catherine de' Medici (1524–1589), niece of Anne; Charles III, Duke of Lorraine (1589–1608), son-in-law of Catherine (although her granddaughter Isabella Clara Eugenia would have been genealogically senior); Margaret of Valois (1608–1610), daughter of Catherine; wife of King Henry IV of France. The marriage produced no children and was annulled. Henry then married Margaret's cousin, Marie de' Medici; As Appanage: Charles de Valois (1573–1650), illegitimate son of Charles IX of France and duke of Angoulême; Louis-Emmanuel d'Angoulême (1650–1653), his son	John I, Duke of Bourbon (1417–1434), son of Anne; Louis I, Count of Montpensier (1434–1486), son of John I and Marie, Duchess of Auvergne (see Dukes of Auvergne below); husband of Joanna; Gilbert, Count of Montpensier (1486–1496), son of Louis I; Louis II, Count of Montpensier (1496–1501), son of Gilbert; Charles III, Duke of Bourbon (1501–1527), son of Gilbert; From 1525–1538 the dauphinate was confiscated by the king and united with the royal domain.: Louise de Bourbon, Duchess of Montpensier (1527–1561), daughter of Gilbert; Louis, Duke of Montpensier (1561–1583), son of Louise; François, Duke of Montpensier (1583–1592), son of Louis; Henri, Duke of Montpensier (1592–1608), son of François; Marie de Bourbon, Duchess of Montpensier (1608–1627), daughter of Henri; Anne Marie Louise d'Orléans, Duchess of Montpensier (1627–1693), daughter of Marie; At her death in 1693, the title returned to the royal domain. It was later given to: Elisabeth, Dauphine of Auvergne (1652–1722), great-great-granddaughter of the great-great-aunt of the predecessor, married Philip I, Duke of Orléans, Dauphin of Auvergne; Philip II, Duke of Orléans, Dauphin of Auvergne, son of Elisabeth
Became part of the royal domain upon the ascension of Louis XIII, son of Henry IV and Marie de'Medici	Afterwards, the title returned to the royal domain and was claimed as a courtesy title by the dukes of Orléans, and the modern Orleanist pretenders

== Bishops of Clermont ==
The title of bishop of Clermont is used from 1160 onwards. Before then they were called bishop of Arvernes. In 2002, the Bishopric of Clermont was incorporated into the Archbishopric of Clermont-Ferrand.

=== List of bishops of Arvernes ===
- Saint Austromoine (3rd or 4th century)
- Urbicus
- Legonius
- Saint Illidius (also called Allyre or Alyre) († 384)
- Nepotianus
- Artemius
- Venerand
- Rusticus
- Namatius (also called Namacius or Namace)
- Eparchius
- Saint Apollinarius I (471–486)
- Abrunculus
- Euphrasius († 515)
- Apollinarius II
- Saint Quintien (about 523)
- Gallus of Clermont (Gallus I) (about 486/525-551)
- Cautin (about 554–572)
- Saint Avitus (Avitus I) (572–594)
- Caesarius (627)
- Saint Gallus (Gallus II) (about 650)
- Genesius († 662)
- Gyroindus (660)
- Felix
- Garivaldus
- Saint-Priest (also called Saint Prix) (666–676)
- Avitus II (676–691)
- Bonitus
- Nordebertus
- Proculus
- Stephanus (Étienne I) (761)
- Adebertus (785)
- Bernouin (about 811)
- Stabilis (823–860)
- Sigon (about 863)
- Egilmar of Clermont (875–891)
- Adalard (910)
- Arnold (about 912)
- Bernard I
- Étienne II of Clermont (about 945–976)
- Begon (about 980–1010)
- Étienne III of Clermont (about 1010–1014 / 1013)
- Étienne IV (1014–1025)
- Rencon (1030–1053)
- Étienne V of Polignac (about 1053–1073)
- Guillaume of Chamalières (Guillaume I) (1073–1076)
- Durand (1077–1095)
- Guillaume of Baffie (Guillaume II) (1096)
- Pierre Roux (Pierre I) (1105–1111)
- Aimeri (1111–1150)
- Étienne VI of Mercœur (1151–1169)

=== List of bishops of Clermont ===
- Ponce of Clairvaux (1170–1189)
- Gilbert I (1190–1195)
- Robert of Auvergne (1195–1227)
- Hughes of la Tour du Pin (1227–1249)
- Guy of la Tour du Pin (1250–1286)
- Aimar of Cros (1286–1297)
- Jean Aicelin (Jean I) (1298–1301)
- Pierre of Cros (Pierre II) (1302–1304)
- Aycelin of Montaigut (also called Aubert) (1307–1328)
- Arnaud Roger of Comminges (1328–1336)
- Raymond of Aspet (1336–1340)
- Étienne Aubert (Étienne VII) (was also Pope Innocent VI from 1352–1362) (1340–1342)
- Pierre André (Pierre III) (1342–1349)
- Pierre of Aigrefeuille (Pierre IV) (1349–1357)
- Jean de Mello (Jean II) (1357–1376)
- Henri of La Tour (1376–1415)
- Martin Gouge de Charpaignes (1415–1444)
- Jacques of Comborn (Jacques I) (1445–1474)
- Antoine Allemand (Antoine I) (1475–1476)
- Cardinal Charles II, Duke of Bourbon (Charles I) (1476–1488)
- Charles of Bourbon (Charles II) (1489–1504)
- Jacques of Amboise (Jacques II) (1505–1516)
- Thomas Duprat (1517–1528)
- Guillaume Duprat (Guillaume III) (1529–1560)
- Cardinal Bernard Saliviati (Bernard II) (1561–1567)
- Antoine of Saint-Nectaire (Antoine II) (1567–1584)
- Cardinal François de La Rochefoucauld (François I) (1585–1609)
- Antoine Rose (Antoine III) (1609–1614)
- Joachim of Estaing (1614–1650)
- Louis of Estaing (Louis I) (1650–1664)
- Gilbert of Veiny d'Arbouze (Gilbert II) (1664–1682)
  - Michel of Castagnet (is appointed but does not get his bull and returns)
- Claude II of Saint-Georges (1684–1687)
- François Bochart of Saron (François II) (1687–1715)
- Louis of Balzac Illiers d'Entragues (Louis II) (1716–1717)
- Jean-Baptiste Massillon (1717–1742)
- François-Marie Le Maistre de La Garlaye (1743–1775)
- François of Bonnal (François III) (1776–1800)
  - Jean-François Périer (constitutional bishop) (1791–1802)
- Charles-Antoine-Henri Du Valk de Dampierre (1802–1833)
- Louis-Charles Féron (1833–1879)
- Jean-Pierre Boyer (1879–1892)
- Pierre-Marie Belmont (1893–1921)
- Jean-François-Étienne Marnas (1921–1932)
- Gabriel-Emmanuel-Joseph Piguet (1933–1952)
- Pierre-Abel-Louis Chappot de la Chanonie (1953–1973)
- Jean Louis Joseph Dardel (1974–1995)

=== List of archbishops of Clermont-Ferrand ===
- Hippolyte Simon (1996–2016)
- Francois Kalist (2016–present)

== Dukes of Auvergne ==
Coat of arms of the counts and dukes of Auvergne.

The Duchy of Auvergne was created in 1360 by John II of France, out of part of the Elder County of Auvergne, confiscated by Philip II of France in 1209.

=== List of dukes of Auvergne ===
- John, Duke of Berry (1360–1416), first husband of Joan II, Countess of Auvergne
- Marie of Berry (1416–1434) daughter of John
  - John I, Duke of Bourbon (1416–1434), husband of Marie
- Charles I, Duke of Bourbon (1434–1456), son of Marie and John I
- John II, Duke of Bourbon (1456–1488), son of Charles I
- Charles II, Duke of Bourbon (1488), son of Charles I
- Peter II, Duke of Bourbon (1488–1503), son of Charles I
- Suzanne, Duchess of Bourbon (1503–1521), daughter of Peter II
  - Charles III, Duke of Bourbon (1505–1527), husband of Susanna

After his death in 1527, the title was confiscated and passed to the royal domain.

- Louise of Savoy (1476–1531), granddaughter of Charles I, Duke of Bourbon through her mother, Margaret of Bourbon

Louise confronted Charles III's right to succession with the support of her son, King Francis I of France. After her death in 1531, the title passed to the royal domain.

- Charles X of France (1757–1824)
