= William VI, Count of Auvergne =

William VI of Auvergne

Count of Auvergne
- Reign: c. 1095 - c. 1136
- Predecessor: Robert II of Auvergne
- Successor: Robert III of Auvergne
- Died: c. 1136
- Spouse: Emma of Sicily
- Issue: Robert; William; Judith
- House: House of Auvergne
- Father: Robert II of Auvergne
- Mother: Judith of Melgueil

William VI of Auvergne (c. 1095–1136) was a French count of the historically independent region of Auvergne, today in central France.

== Life ==
He was the son of Robert II of Auvergne and Judith of Melgueil.

He was married to Emma, daughter of Roger I of Sicily in 1086/1087.

Around 1095 he succeeded his father as Count of Auvergne.

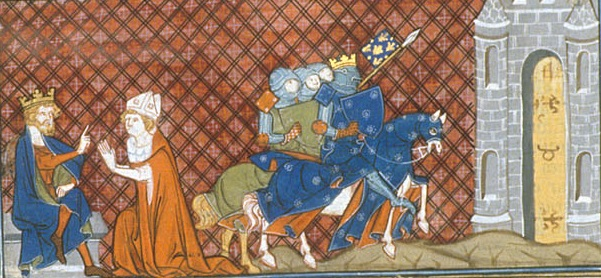
Representation of the siege of Clermont by Louis VI who, on the left, is being homaged by Aimeric

After the Council of Clermont he took part in the First Crusade, being still present in the Levant by 1103.

Around 1121, William took control of the church of clermont and fortified it against the Bishop of Clermont-Ferrand Aimeric. Aimerc then made a complaint of tyranny against the Count and King Louis VI of France sent an army and reinstated the bishop. In 1131, William resumed hostilities counting on the support of the Count of Poitiers (presumably William X), whose suzerainty he recognized. But Louis t returned to Auvergne. The Count of Poitiers and his vassal submitted and promised to submit to the judgment of an assembly of the kingdom's nobles.

== Issue ==
He and Emma had:

- Robert III (died 1145).
- William VIII (died 1182), who married Anne of Nevers.
- Judith, married to William, Count of Le Puy-en-Velay.

French nobility
Preceded by Robert II	Count of Auvergne c. 1095 – c. 1136	Succeeded by Robert III
