= Raymond III of Rouergue =

Raymond III, sometimes numbered Raymond II (died in or about 1008), was the count of Rouergue and Quercy from 961 to his death. Raymond achieved a suzerainty over several neighbouring counties and successfully titled himself margrave of Septimania (Latin marchio, or even dux, duke). He was the son and successor of Raymond II.

According to the Liber miraculorum Sancte Fidis (Book of the Miracles of Saint Faith), Raymond died while on a pilgrimage to Jerusalem. Prior to his departure, he gave the Abbey Church of Saint Foy twenty-one gilt silver vessels, an expensive gilt saddle and an estate on the Mediterranean coast with its saltworks. According to the Liber, he acquired the saddle as booty in a war against the Saracens. This probably refers to his participation in a defensive campaign against the Córdoban general al-Mansur prior to 987.

By his death, Raymond was suzerain over Albi and Nîmes and his son received 50,000 solidi or one half of the total payment for the archbishopric of Narbonne in 1016. On his death, his son Hugh received Rouergue, but the margraviate passed to William III of Toulouse.

== Sources ==
- Lewis, Archibald R. The Development of Southern French and Catalan Society, 718-1050.
