= Raymond II of Rouergue =

Raymond II, sometimes numbered Raymond I (c. 904 – 961) was the count of Rouergue and Quercy from 937 to his death. He was the son of Ermengol of Rouergue and Adelaide. Under Raymond, Rouergue achieved a suzerainty over neighbouring counties and he successfully titled himself Margrave (marchio) of Septimania.

Raymond's lordship extended over Albi and Nîmes and, at least around 960, as far north as the Limousin. Raymond was the head of his family, which also ruled Toulouse. Even in his time, his family appeared to be declining. He willed a Gascon fief to Duke Sancho V and allowed it to become allodial after his death. Nonetheless, his power was such that he could command lands as far north as Auvergne and was the most powerful lord of Aquitaine, even holding a "vicar's court" in the Limousin.

His will of 961 is preserved. In it, not only does he reference the aforementioned lands in Auvergne and Gascony, but he mentions seventeen castles and a rocheta. Some castles were given to his wife and heirs and some to the churches of Albi and Cahors and to various abbeys. He died later that year. According to the Liber miraculorum Sancte Fidis (Book of the Miracles of Saint Faith), he was murdered while on a pilgrimage to Santiago de Compostela.

Raymond married Bertha, daughter of Boso of Tuscany. He was succeeded by his son Raymond III.

== Sources ==
- Lewis, Archibald R. The Development of Southern French and Catalan Society, 718-1050.
