= Saint Rusticus =

Saint Rusticus (French: Saint-Rustique) may refer to:

- Saint Rusticus of Clermont (died 446), Bishop of Clermont in Auvergne
- Saint Rusticus (Archbishop of Lyon)
- Saint Rusticus of Narbonne, bishop of that city
- a martyred companion of Saint Denis of Paris
- A martyr of Verona; see Saints Firmus and Rusticus

== See also ==
- Saint-Rustice, Haute-Garonne, France
