= William IV of Auvergne =

Count of Auvergne from 989 to 1016

William IV
- Count of Auvergne
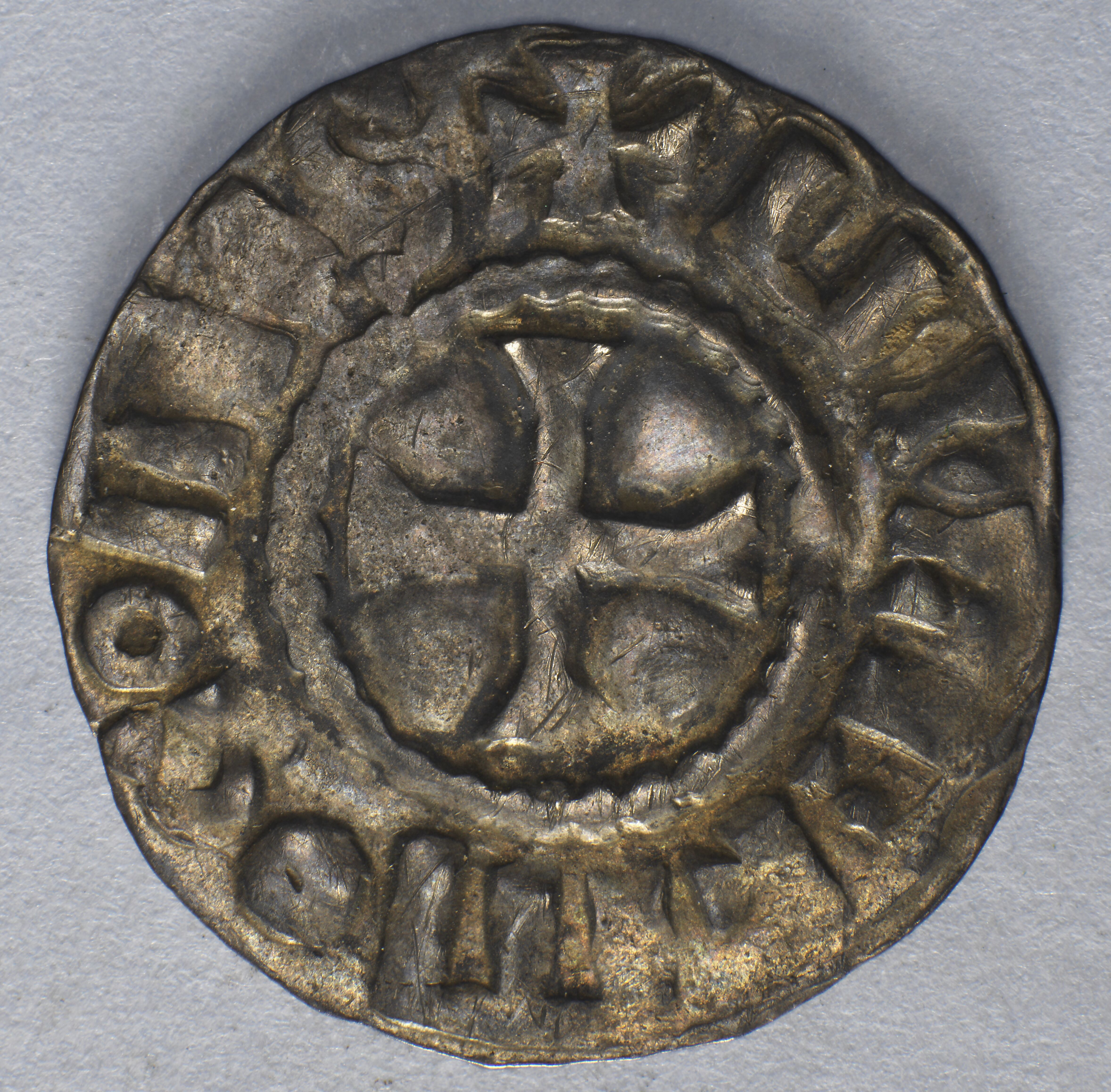
- Predecessor: Guy I
- Successor: Robert I
- Born: first half of the 10th century
- Died: 1016
- Spouse: Umberga
- Issue: Robert; Stephen; William; Ermengarde
- Father: Robert II
- Mother: Engelberga

William IV of Auvergne (died 1016) was the son of the viscount of Auvergne, Robert II of Clermont and Engelberga (as shown in document no. 363 of the Cartulaire de Sauxillanges and document no. 1525 of the Recueil des chartes de l'abbaye de Cluny, tomé 2). Robert II was the son of the count of Clermont and viscount of Auvergne, Robert I of Clermont, and Aldegardis, as confirmed by document no. 336 of the Cartulaire de Brioude, in which his brother Stephen makes a donation for the souls of their parents.

== Biography ==
William, after the death of his uncle, Stephen (?-ca. 970), bishop of Clermont, during the reign of Lothair (mense augusto feria quarta, regnante Lothario rege Francorum) countersigned a donation made by his brother, the count of Auvergne, Guy I, for the souls of their parents, Robert II and Engelberga, their brother Robert (III) and their uncle the bishop, Stephen, as shown in document no. 363 of the Cartulaire de Sauxillanges, already cited.

In 989, upon the death of his brother Guy I, who had no descendants, according to the historian, cleric, canonist and librarian French, Étienne Baluze, William succeeded Guy in the title of Count of Auvergne.

Little is known about William. The name of his wife, Umberga, whose ancestors are not known, is known, as Baluze asserts in his Histoire généalogique de la maison d'Auvergne.

Umberga, towards the end of the millennium, in the first months of the reign of Robert II, called the Pious, according to document no. 323 of the Cartulaire de Brioude, made a donation together with her husband William and, according to document no. 267 of the Cartulaire de Sauxillanges, around the year 1000, made a donation for the salvation of her own soul, that of her husband, William, and all their children, both living and dead.

== Marriage and descendants ==
William had married Ermengarde who, according to some documents, was the daughter of Stephen of Brioude and his second wife, Adelaide of Anjou; indeed, according to the Flandria Generosa, Ermengarda, countess of Auvergne, was the half-sister of the queen of France, Constance of Arles (Gostantia regina Francorum et Ermengardis comitissa Arvernensis sorores fuerunt). But not Baluze who, in his Histoire généalogique de la maison d'Auvergne, maintains that Ermengarda is indeed the sister of Constance of Arles, but is the wife of the count of Auvergne, Robert I.
William and Umberga or Ermengarda had four children:

- Robert I (?- before 1032), mentioned in a donation by Pons, count of Gévaudan and Forez, count of Auvergne.
- Stephen (?- 1013), mentioned in a donation with his mother and brothers, bishop of Clermont.
- William, mentioned in a donation with his mother and brothers.
- Ermengarde (?- after 1042), who, in 1005, according to the Chronica Albrici Monachi Trium Fontium, was married to the count of Blois, of Chartres, of Châteaudun, of Tours, of Provins, of Reims, of Meaux and of Troyes, Odo II.

== Ancestry ==
Arimannus ?
Eustorgius
Robert I of Clermont
Arsinda
Robert II of Clermont
Aldegardis
William IV of Auvergne
Engelberga

== See also ==
- Franks
- Counts of Auvergne
- Counts of Poitiers
- Dukes of Aquitaine
- History of France

== Bibliography ==
=== Primary sources ===
- Cartulaire de Brioude (in Latin). 1863..
- Doniol, Henri (1864). Cartulaire de Sauxillanges (in Latin)..
- Recueil des chartes de l'abbaye de Cluny, tomé 2 (in Latin)..
- Monumenta Germaniae Historica, Scriptores, tomus IX (in Latin). Archived from the original on 2018-06-13..
- Monumenta Germaniae Historica, Scriptores, tomus XXIII (in Latin). Archived from the original on 2018-06-13..

=== Historiographical literature ===
- Louis Alphen, la Francia nell'XI secolo, in «Storia del mondo medievale», vol. II, 1979, pp. 770–806
- Baluze, Histoire généalogique de la maison d'Auvergne, tome1 (in French)..

French nobility
Preceded by Guy I	Count of Auvergne ca. 990s - ca. 1010s	Succeeded by Robert I
