= Robert II of Auvergne =

Count of Auvergne
- Reign: c. 1060 – c. 1095
- Predecessor: William V of Auvergne
- Successor: William VI, Count of Auvergne
- Died: c. 1095
- Spouse: Bertha of Rouergue; Judith of Melgueil
- Issue: William; Judith
- House: House of Auvergne
- Father: William V of Auvergne
- Mother: Philipa

Robert II (died c. 1095) was a count of Auvergne from circa 1060 until his death.

== Life ==
He was the son of William V of Auvergne and Philipa of Gévaudan.

He married Bertha of Rouergue, daughter of Hugh of Rouergue, count of Rouergue and Gévaudan. Since Bertha inherited the county of Rouergue and Gévaudan from her father, Robert became count jure uxoris.

Around 1060 he succeeded his father as Count of Auvergne.

After the death of his wife, Robert lost the title of count of Rouergue, but kept the county of Gévaudan.

He then married Judith of Melgueil, daughter of Raymond I, count of Melgueil.

He died around 1095.

== Issue ==
Robert and Judith had two children:

- William VI, who inherithed the county of Auvergne;
- Judith (died 1110s), who became a nun at La Chaise-Dieu.

French nobility
Preceded by William V	Count of Auvergne c. 1060 – c. 1095	Succeeded by William VI
