= Hugh of Rouergue =

11th century French count

Hugh (died 1054) was the Count of Rouergue and Gévaudan from 1008 to his death. He was the son and successor of Raymond II and he inherited suzerainty over neighbouring counties (Agde, Béziers, Uzès) and over Narbonne.

In 1016, Hugh sold his rights over the Archdiocese of Narbonne. In 1035, he sold certain allodial lands to his viscount, Berengar. In January 1051, Hugh donated the church of Tribons to the abbey of Conques for the sake of his father's soul. He married Fides (also Fe or Foy), daughter of Wilfred II of Cerdanya, to whom he had sold the archdiocese in 1016. They had two daughters, the elder of which, Bertha, inherited Rouergue and Gévaudan, but lost suzerainty over the other territories to William IV of Toulouse. She married Robert II of Auvergne while her younger sister, Fides, married Bernard, Viscount of Narbonne.

== Sources ==
- Foixstory: Les Comtes de Toulouse.
- Lewis, Archibald R. The Development of Southern French and Catalan Society, 718-1050.
