= Guy I of Auvergne =

Count of Auvergne
- Reign: 980-?
- Predecessor: Bertrand, Viscount of Auvergne
- Successor: William IV of Auvergne
- Died: c. 990s
- Spouse: Ausende
- House: House of Auvergne
- Father: Robert II, Viscount of Auvergne
- Mother: Ingelberga

Guy I (10th century) was viscount of Auvergne and the first count of Auvergne.

== Life ==
He is first cited as Viscount of Auvergne around 980, after the death of his brother, Bertrand, Viscount of Auvergne.

He married a woman named Ausende.

In various donations to the Abbey of Cluny he is defined as "Princeps Avernorum". and supposedly "count". Accordingly, his successors would style themselves count of Auvergne.

French nobility
Preceded by Title created	Count of Auvergne ca. 980 - ?	Succeeded by William IV
