= William V of Auvergne =

Count of Auvergne
- Reign: c. 1030 – c. 1060
- Predecessor: Robert I of Auvergne
- Successor: Robert II of Auvergne
- Died: c. 1060
- Spouse: Philipa
- Issue: Robert; Stephen; William; Pons; Begon
- House: House of Auvergne
- Father: Robert I of Auvergne
- Mother: Ermengarde of Provence

William V (c. 1000–c. 1060) was a count of Auvergne.

== Life ==
He became count after the death of his father, Robert I of Auvergne in the 1030s.

He married Philipa, daughter of Stephen, count of Gévaudan.

At Pentecost 1059 he assisted at the coronation of Philip I.

He died around 1060.

== Issue ==
William and Philipa had five children:

- Robert II (died 1090s), who inherited the county of Auvergne;
- Stephen;
- William;
- Pons;
- Begon.

French nobility
Preceded by Robert I	Count of Auvergne c. 1030 – c. 1060	Succeeded by Robert II
