= William VII of Auvergne =

Count of Auvergne
- Reign: c. 1145 - 1155
- Predecessor: Robert III of Auvergne
- Successor: William VIII of Auvergne

Dauphin of Auvergne
- Reign: 1155 - 1169
- Successor: Dalfi d'Alvernha
- Died: c. 1169
- Spouse: Marquise d'Albon
- Issue: Robert; Ansalide; Bellissende
- House: House of Auvergne
- Father: Robert III of Auvergne

William VII "the Young" of Auvergne was a Count of the region of Auvergne, France during the years 1145 to 1168. He accompanied the French king, Louis VII, on the Second Crusade. William was the first Count of Auvergne to be given the title Dauphin (Prince). What is by convenience called the dauphinate of Auvergne was in reality the remnant of the county of Auvergne after the usurpation of William VII around 1155 by his uncle, William VIII the Old.

The young count was able to maintain his status in part of his county, especially Beaumont, Chamalières, and Montferrand. Some authors have therefore named William VII and his descendants "counts of Clermont" (although this risks confusion with the county of Clermont in Beauvaisis and the episcopal county of Clermont in Auvergne). The majority of authors, however, anticipating the formalization of the dauphinate in 1302, choose to call William VII and his successors the dauphins of Auvergne. Still others, out of convenience, choose to call these successors the "counts-dauphins of Auvergne."

The title of dauphin of Auvergne was derived from William VII's mother, who was the daughter of the Dauphin de Viennois, Guigues IV. This meant that William VII's male descendants were usually given "Dauphin" as a second name.

== Marriage and children ==
He was married to Marquise d'Albon, a daughter of Count Guigues IV, the Dauphin of Albon, and had 3 or 4 children :

- Robert IV Dauphin d'Auvergne (died 1235), Count of Clermont
- Ansalide, married Béraud IV, Sire de Mercœur († probably 1200)
- Bellissende, married Heracle III, vicomte de Polignac

French nobility
Preceded by Robert III	Count of Auvergne; 1145–1155	Succeeded by William VIII the Old usurper
Preceded by new creation	Dauphin of Auvergne; 1155–1169	Succeeded by Robert IV
