= Rouvres-en-Plaine =

- Commune
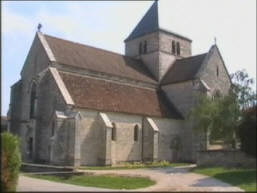
- Collegial church of Saint Jean-Baptiste

- Coat of arms
- Location of Rouvres-en-Plaine
- Location within France Location within Bourgogne-Franche-Comté
- Coordinates: 47°14′22″N 5°08′30″E
- Country: France
- Region: Bourgogne-Franche-Comté
- Department: Côte-d'Or
- Arrondissement: Dijon
- Canton: Genlis
- Intercommunality: Plaine Dijonaise

Government
  - Mayor (2020–2026): Hubert Sauvain
- Area^{1}: 14.64 km^{2} (5.65 sq mi)
- Highest elevation: 216 m (709 ft)
- Lowest elevation: 200 m (660 ft)
- Population (2023): 1,303
  - Density: 89.00/km^{2} (230.5/sq mi)
- Time zone: UTC+01:00 (CET)
  - Summer (DST): UTC+02:00 (CEST)
- INSEE/Postal code: 21532 /21110
- ^{1} French Land Register data, which excludes lakes, ponds, glaciers > 1 km^{2} (0.386 sq mi or 247 acres) and river estuaries.

Rouvres-en-Plaine (French pronunciation: [ʁuvʁ ɑ̃ plɛn]) is a commune in the Côte-d'Or department in eastern France.

== Population ==
Historical population
Year	Pop.	±% p.a.
1968	413	—
1975	580	+4.97%
1982	704	+2.81%
1990	797	+1.56%
1999	866	+0.93%
2007	1,006	+1.89%
2012	1,029	+0.45%
2017	1,128	+1.85%
2023	1,303	+2.43%
Source: INSEE

== See also ==
- Communes of the Côte-d'Or department
