= Clermont-Ferrand Cathedral =

Cathedral in Clermont-Ferrand, Auvergne, France

Clermont-Ferrand Cathedral Cathedral of Our Lady of the Assumption of Clermont-Ferrand Cathédrale Notre-Dame-de-l'Assomption de Clermont-Ferrand
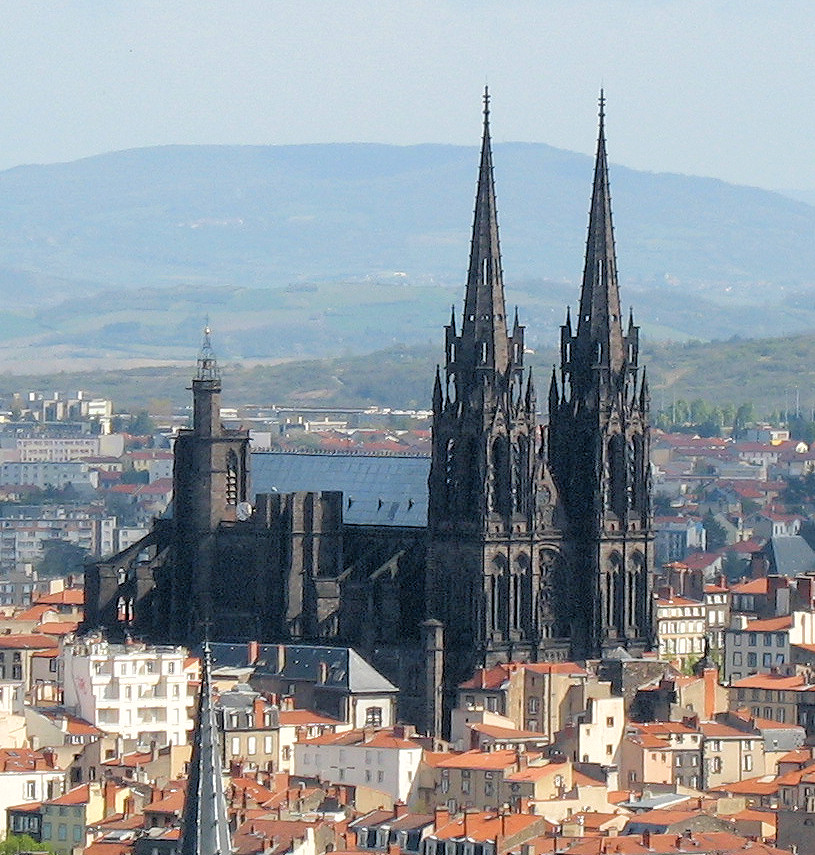
- Clermont-Ferrand Cathedral from Montjuzet Park in April 2006.
- Clermont-Ferrand Cathedral; Cathedral of Our Lady of the Assumption of Clermont-Ferrand; Cathédrale Notre-Dame-de-l'Assomption de Clermont-Ferrand
- Location: Clermont-Ferrand, France 45°46′43″N 3°05′09″E
- Denomination: Roman Catholic Church

History
- Status: Cathedral

Architecture
- Functional status: Active
- Architectural type: Church
- Style: Gothic

Administration
- Province: Archdiocese of Clermont

Monument historique
- Official name: Cathédrale Notre-Dame-de-l'Assomption de Clermont-Ferrand
- Type: Classé
- Designated: 1862
- Reference no.: PA00091979

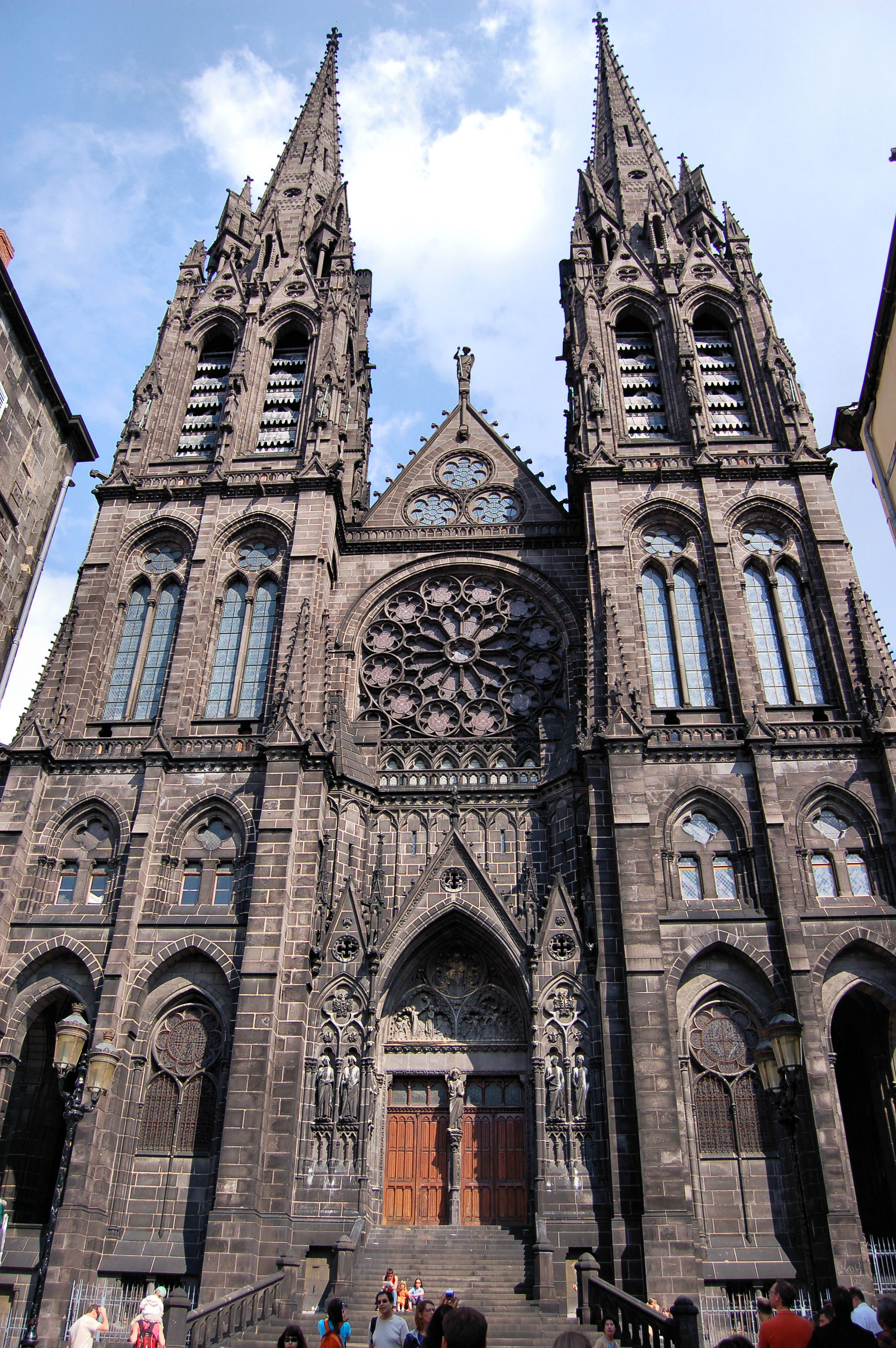
The western front

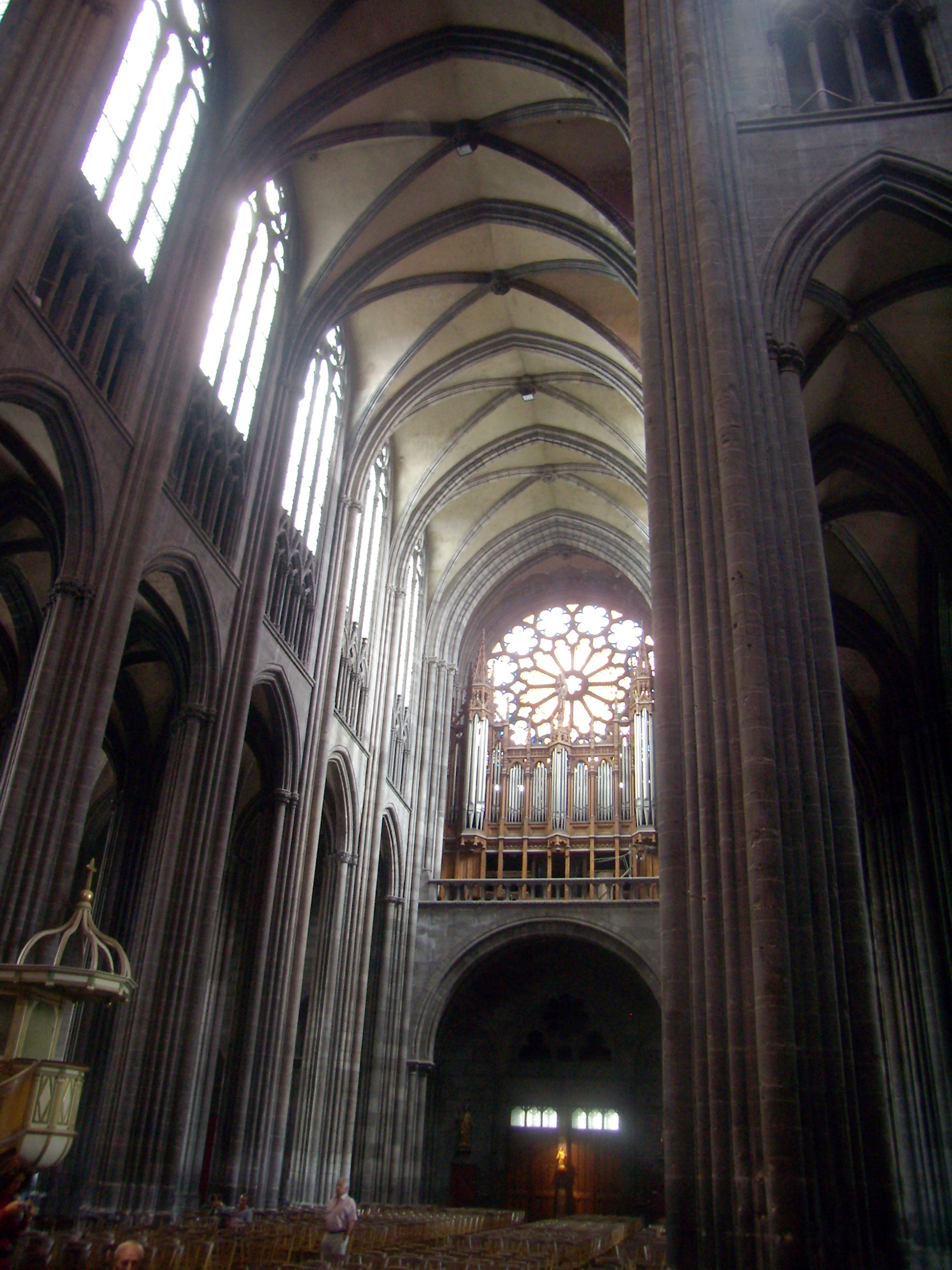
Interior of the cathedral

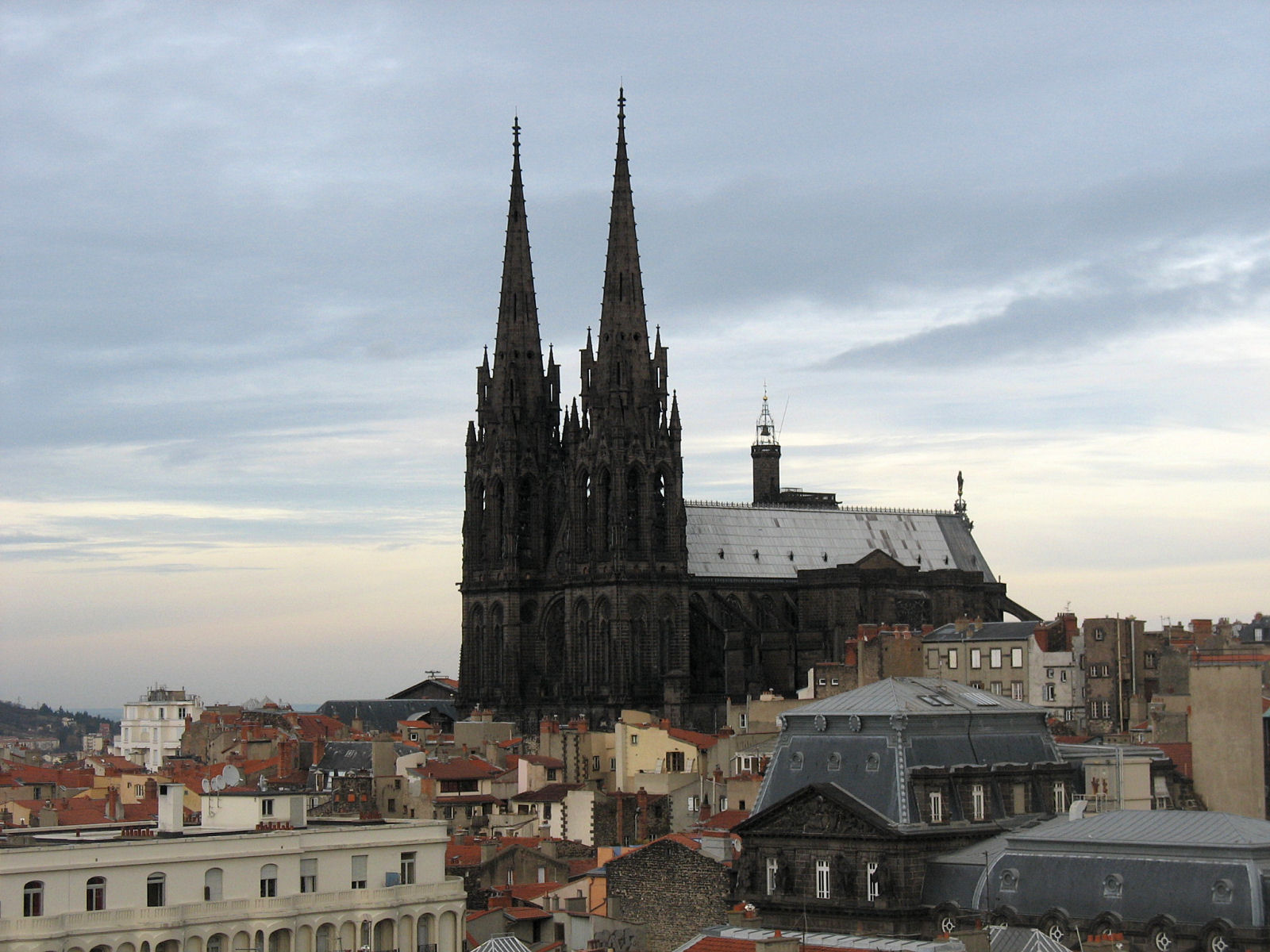
View from the south. The black Gothic cathedral towers above the city with its dominating spires 96.1 metres high.

Clermont-Ferrand Cathedral, or the Cathedral of Our Lady of the Assumption of Clermont-Ferrand (French: Cathédrale Notre-Dame-de-l'Assomption de Clermont-Ferrand), is a Gothic cathedral and French national monument located in the city of Clermont-Ferrand in the Auvergne. It is the seat of the Archbishops of Clermont (bishops until 2002).

It is built entirely in black lava stone, which makes it highly distinctive and visible from a great distance. Its twin spires are 96.1 metres tall, and tower above the city's rooftops. It has been listed since 1862 as a monument historique by the French Ministry of Culture.

== History ==
In the 5th century, bishop Namatius laid the foundations of the city's first cathedral, allowing the Christian community to leave its ghetto, the "vicus christianorum". He dedicated the building to Saints Vitalis and Agricola, whose relics he brought from Bologna. It was 43 metres long and on a basilica plan, as is known by the account of Gregory of Tours. It was ornamented in marble, with a nave, two parallel aisles, a transept and 70 columns. It was destroyed in 760 by Pepin the Short who, repenting of this act, gave a large sum to bishop Haddebert to finance his reconstruction work, which lasted from 764 to 768. This second structure was again destroyed, this time by the Normans, in 915.

Bishop Stephen II built a third Romanesque cathedral, which was consecrated in 946. Unsurpassed, this building probably served as the model and prototype for many churches in the Auvergne. The present crypt (made up of an ambulatory and radiating chapels) dates back to this 10th-century church, and included a 4th-century white marble sarcophagus.

In 1248, inspired by a visit on Sainte-Chapelle on a trip to Paris, bishop Hugues de la Tour decided to launch work on a new cathedral. Constructing a church in the prestigious Northern Gothic style would thus allow him to assert his supremacy over a city that had been put back into its bishop's power (rather than that of the counts of Auvergne) just some decades earlier. Notre-Dame-du-Port, that had inspired the cathedral of Stephen II, would thus again be surpassed.

The most striking feature of the structure is the material used: it is the locally-cut volcanic "pierre de Volvic" (of the Trachyandesite type) that gives the building its dark colour and whose strength allows the construction of highly delicate pillars.

Jean Deschamps (fr) was entrusted with the work. He had already worked on the cathedrals at Narbonne and Limoges. Inspired by Beauvais and Amiens, he realized original plans in which the windows do not occupy all the available space between the supports and do not have any bracing arches, the ribs directly penetrate under the arch, the choir-rotunda pillars' elliptical plan allows all the light from the apsidal windows to penetrate into the sanctuary, together with the flying buttresses which allow the nave aisles to be flooded with light.

Jean worked from 1248 to 1287 on the choir, in which Louis IX came to marry his son (the future Philip III) to Isabella of Aragon. The king financed (maybe for this occasion) part of the stained glass windows that appear to be from the same workshop as those in Sainte-Chapelle. The choir, the transept and the start of the nave were finished about 1295.

Pierre Deschamps took over from his father (or perhaps grandfather) in the period up to 1325, pushing the works beyond the transept crossing. From 1325 to 1340, the towers of the transept arms were raised by an anonymous master. One of them is familiar: the tour de la Bayette, the highest one, named after the watcher placed at its peak ("bayer" means "to keep watch").

From 1340 to 1355, Pierre de Cébazat, known to have worked on the la Chaise-Dieu, finished the three spans of the nave, that allowed it to be linked to the Romanesque towers of the church of Stephen II, though the disturbances of the Hundred Years' War did not leave him time to finish his work. During the years that followed, the chapter was satisfied to have him sculpt a new doorjamb for the door of its sacristy.

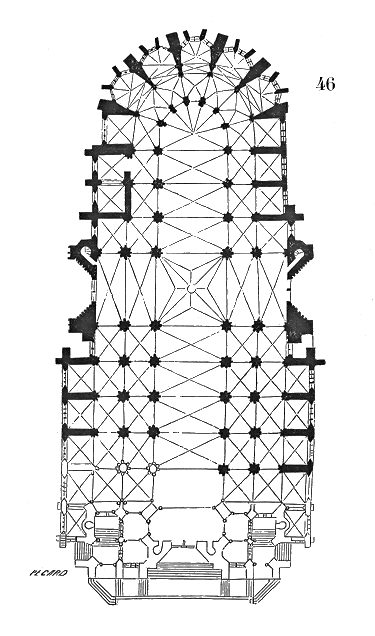
Plan of the Cathedral.

The mainly blue rose window over the north door and the mainly orange one overlooking the south door were made in the fourteenth century. They both fit into a square of 8.50 metres wide. Between 1444 and 1474, the so-called "clocher du retour" was placed above the choir, covered in carved stone. It was demolished after 1741. Between 1507 and 1512 a high roof was raised covered with lead, replacing the original roof. A planned flamboyant Gothic façade was refused by the chapter because it would cost too much.

During the French Revolution, the revolutionaries wanted to tear down the church, but the Benedictine Verdier-Latour managed to persuade them that it would be an excellent gathering place for the people. Only the rood screen, choir stalls, altar, statues and furniture (with the exception of an Easter chandelier by Philippe Caffieri) were removed (the rood screen is preserved in a private house nearby), though three of the four corner transept towers were razed. La Bayette owed its survival only to its practical usefulness, for it has a seventeenth-century bell at the top that strikes the hours. The Romanesque façade of the cathedral of Stephen II was demolished in 1851.

It was not until 1866 that completion works began, built according to the plans of Viollet-le-Duc by his pupil Anatole de Baudot. In 1884, the western façade with its spires and the last span of the nave were finally completed, with full respect for construction methods of the Middle Ages. Only the cleaner cutting of the more modern stone shows the difference. A little-noticed detail is that the building was completely painted with lines to imitate masonry and cut stone blocks. The access steps on the rue des Gras were not built, however, until the very beginning of the 20th century, to make space for which the birthplace of Blaise Pascal was destroyed.

== Dimensions ==
- Total length: 92 m.
- Length of the choir: 36 m.
- Length of the nave and transept: 28.70 m
- Width of the transept: 32.70 m
- Height of the crossing: 28.70 m.
- Height of the aisle: 14.30 m.
- Height of the Tour de la Bayette: 50.70 m
- Height of the western spires: 96.1 m.

== Photos ==
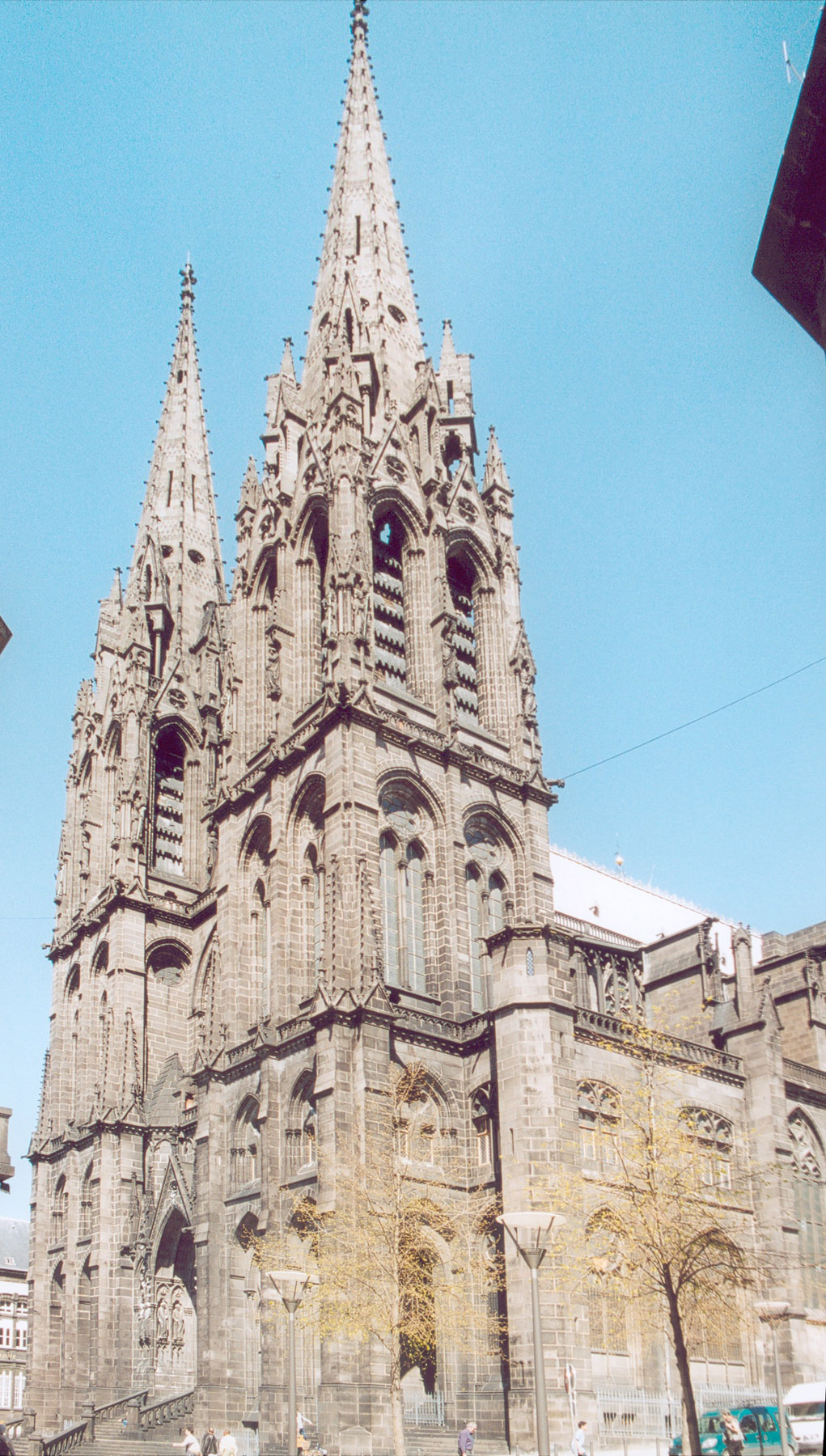
View from "rue des Chaussetiers"

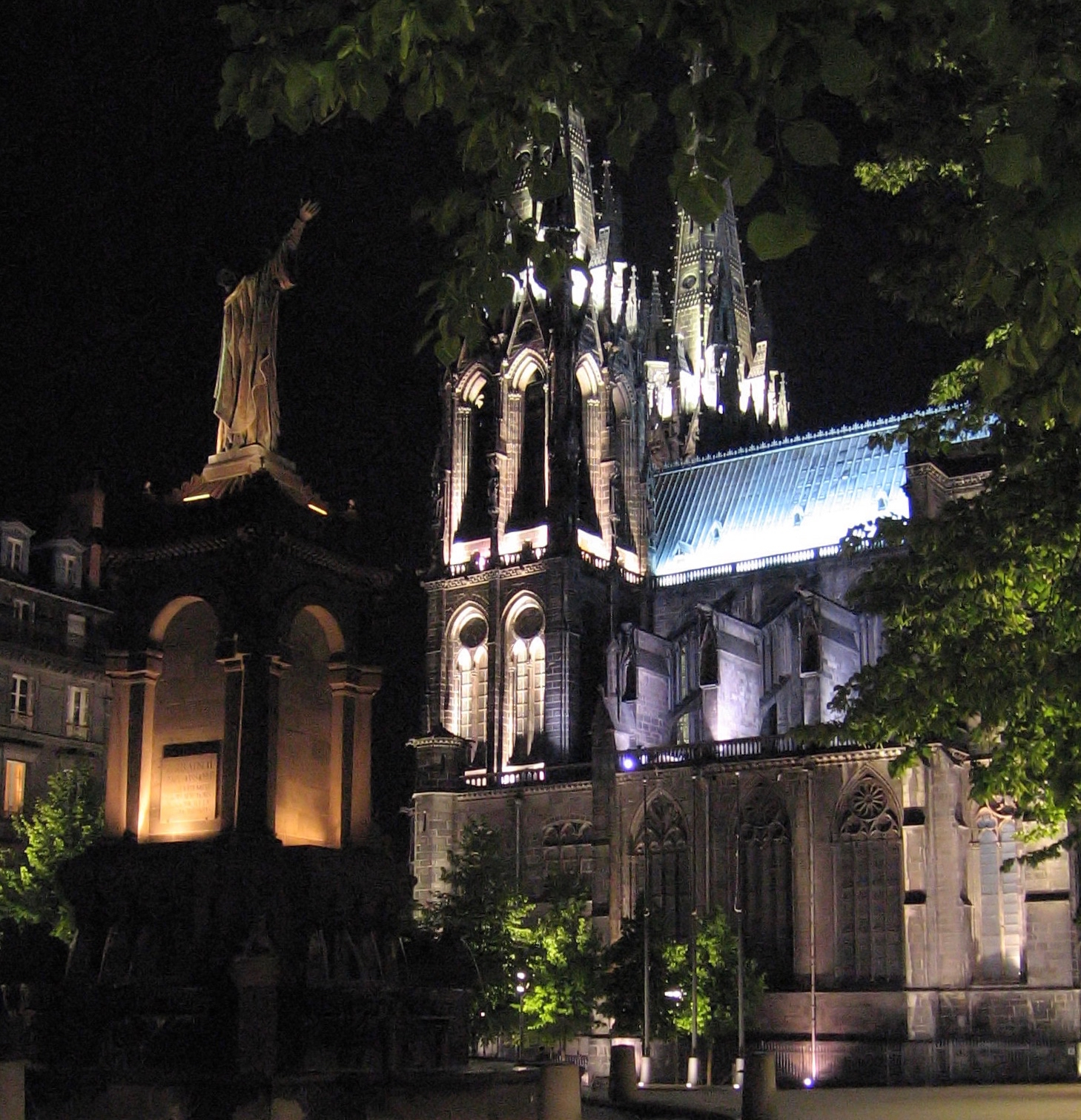
Cathedral and statue of Pope Urban II by night

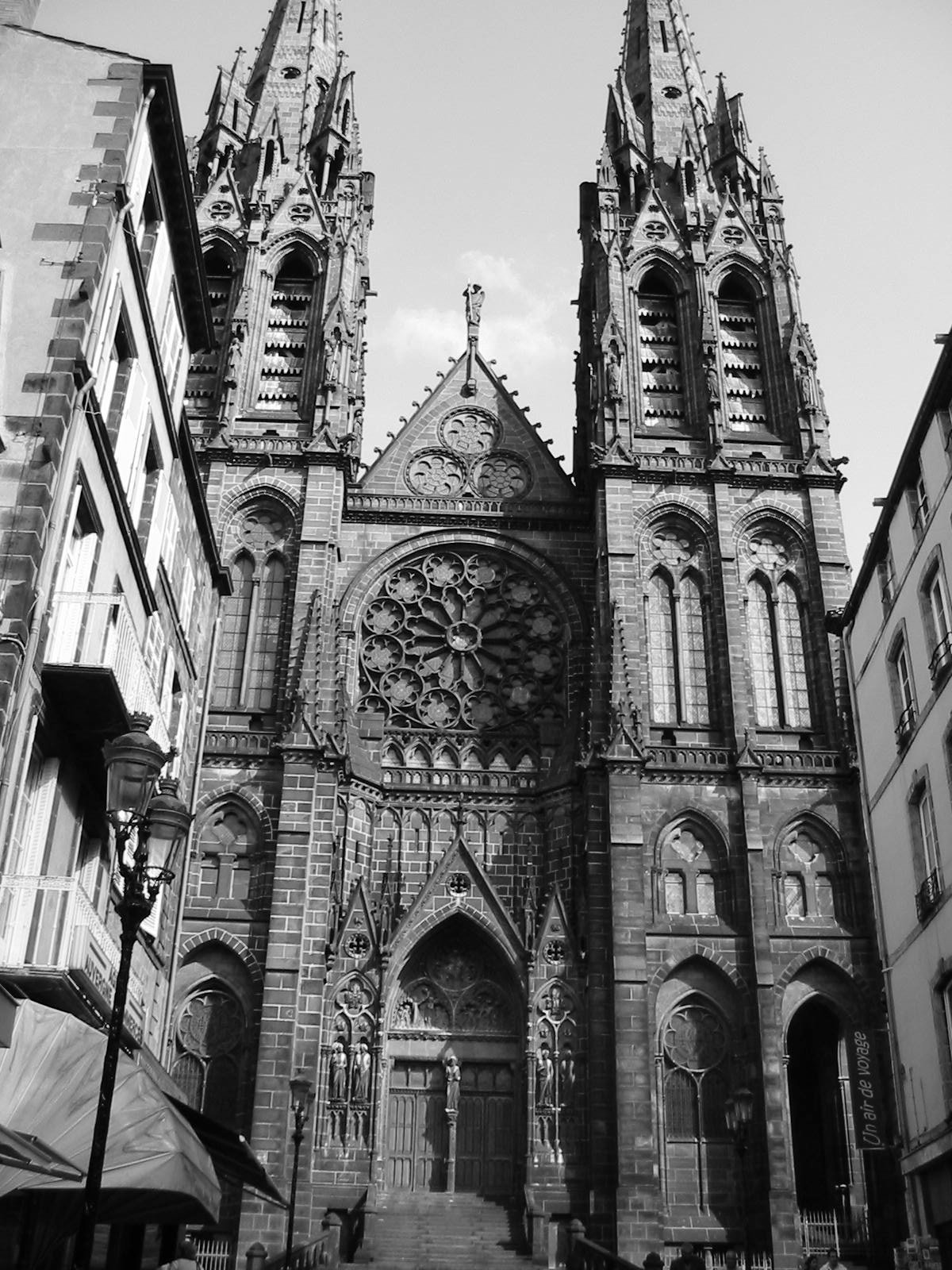
Façade of the cathedral

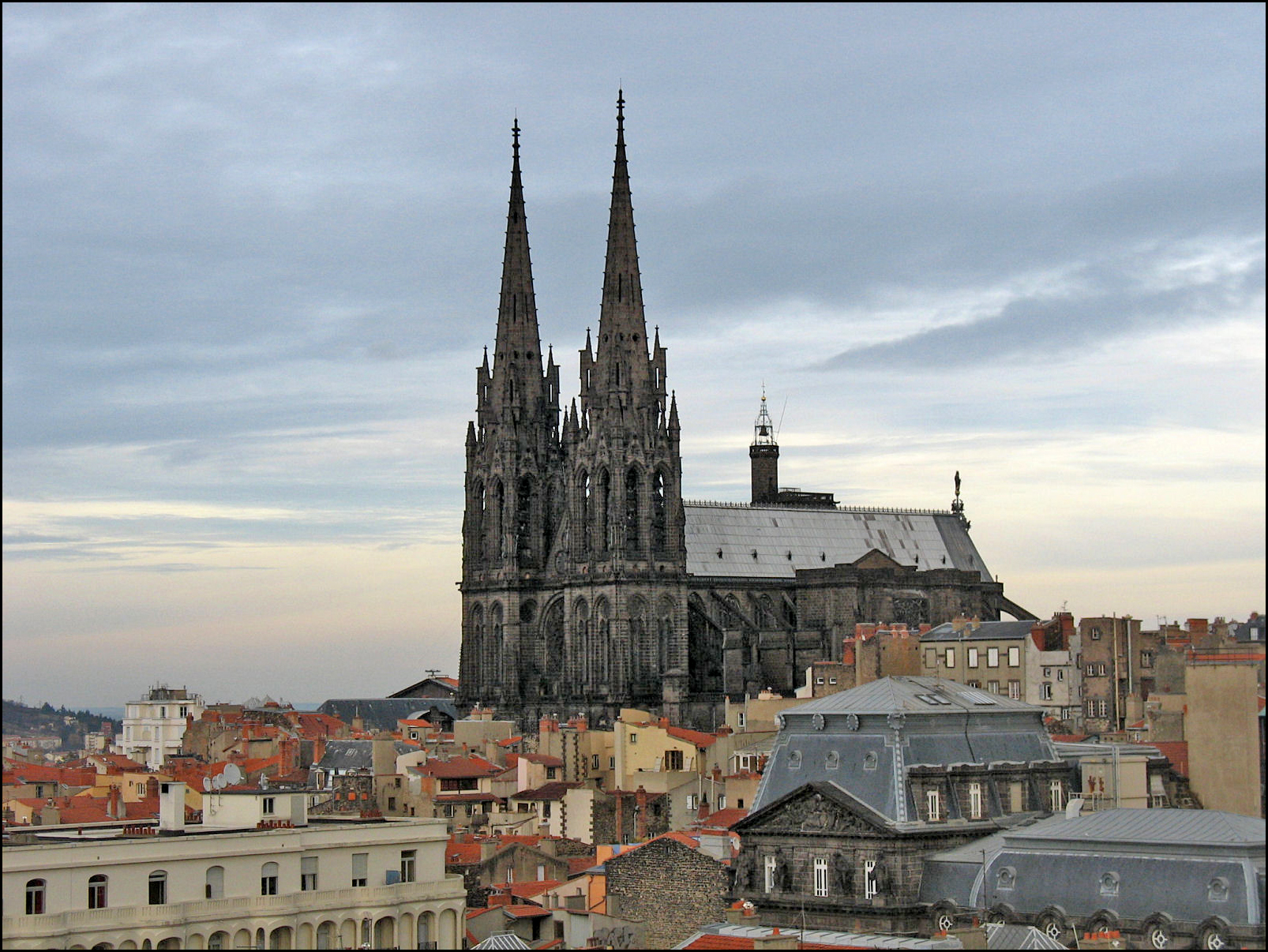
Overview

== Bibliography ==
- Trabue Davis, Michael (1985). The Cathedral of Clermont-Ferrand: History of Its Construction. University Microfilms.
- Courtillé, Anne (1994). La cathédrale de Clermont (in French). Créer. ISBN 2-902894-94-5.
- Morvan, Yves (1995). "Des témoins ressuscités". Monuments historiques (in French) (197).

== See also ==
- List of Gothic Cathedrals in Europe
- Church of St John, Thiers
