= Bertha of Rouergue =

Bertha (died between 1063 and 1065) was the ruling Countess of Rouergue and Gévaudan from 1054 to her death.

She was the daughter and heiress of Hugh of Rouergue and Fides.

In or before 1051, she married Robert II of Auvergne, but had no children with him. On her death, her counties, including Narbonne, Agde, Béziers, and Uzès, were inherited by her distant cousin William IV of Toulouse.

== Sources ==
- Foixstory: Les Comtes de Toulouse.
