= Robert I of Auvergne =

Count of Auvergne
- Reign: 1010s-1030s
- Predecessor: William IV of Auvergne
- Successor: William V of Auvergne
- Died: c. 1030s
- Spouse: Ermengarde of Provence
- Issue: William; Ermengarde
- House: House of Auvergne
- Father: William IV of Auvergne
- Mother: Humberge

Robert I (11th century) was count of Auvergne.

== Life ==
He became count after the death of his father, William IV, in the 1010s.

He married Ermengarde of Provence, daughter of William I of Provence and Adelaide-Blanche of Anjou.

== Issue ==
He and Ermengarde had two children:

- William (died 1050s), who succeeded him as count of Auvergne;
- Ermengarde (c. 984 - 1042), who married Odo II, Count of Blois.

French nobility
Preceded by William IV	Count of Auvergne ca. 1010s - ca. 1030s	Succeeded by William V
