= Robert III of Auvergne =

Count of Auvergne
- Reign: c. 1136 - c. 1145
- Predecessor: William VI, Count of Auvergne
- Successor: William VII of Auvergne
- Died: c. 1145
- Issue: William
- House: House of Auvergne
- Father: William VI, Count of Auvergne
- Mother: Emma of Sicily (?)

Robert III (died c. 1145) was count of Auvergne from c. 1136 until his death.

He was the son of William VI, Count of Auvergne and inherited his title upon his death.

He came into conflict with the canons of Brioude. This was resolved in 1136 by Aimeric, bishop of Clermont, Alberic of Reims, Archbishop of Bourges and Peter, Archbishop of Lyon.

Robert and an unknown wife had one child, William VII of Auvergne, who became the count of Auvergne after his father's death.

French nobility
Preceded by William VI	Count of Auvergne c. 1136 – c. 1145	Succeeded by William VII
