= Ermengarde of Auvergne =

Ermengarde of Auvergne (c. 984-1042) (Note: Also known as "Ermengarde de Clermont") was Countess of Blois via her marriage to Odo II, Count Blois. She influenced her husband to endow and repair monasteries and churches.

== Life ==
Ermengarde was the daughter of Robert I of Auvergne and Ermengarde of Provence. By 1005 she married Odo II, Count Blois, and was his second wife. After Ermengarde's marriage to Odo, she interceded for the monks at Marmoutier abbey, resulting in her husband building a bridge at Tours. At her insistence, he made its usage toll free. Ermengarde also persuaded Odo into repairing the church at the abbey of Epernay.

== Marriage and issue ==
Ermengard and Odo had:

- Bertha of Blois, Duchess of Brittany
- Theobald III, Count of Blois
- Stephen, Count of Troyes & Meaux.

== Sources ==
- Bur, Michel (1990). "À propos du nom d'Étienne : le mariage aquitain de Louis V et la dévolution des comtés champenois". Annales du Midi Année (in French). 102-189-190: 319–327.
- Farmer, Sharon (1986). "Persuasive Voices: Clerical Images of Medieval Wives". Speculum. 61 (3 (July)): 517–543. doi:10.2307/2851594.
- LoPrete, Kimberly A. (1999). "Adela of Blois : Countess and lord (c.1067-1137)". In Evergates, Theodore (ed.). Aristocratic Women in Medieval France. University of Pennsylvania Press. pp. 7–43.
- Munns, John; Kynan-Wilson, William, eds. (2021). Henry of Blois: New Interpretations. The Boydell Press.
- Norgate, Kate (1890). "Odo of Champagne, Count of Blois and 'Tyrant of Burgundy'". The English Historical Review. 5, No. 19, (July): 486–496.
- Stasser, Thierry (1990). "Mathilde, fille du Comte Richard » Essai d'identification". Annales de Normandie (in French). 40–1: 49–64.
