= Liber miraculorum sancte Fidis =

Start of the Liber in a 13th-century English manuscript

The Liber miraculorum sancte Fidis, literally the "Book of the Miracles of Saint Faith", is an account of the miracles attributed to Saint Faith, the patron of the Abbey of Conques in the County of Rouergue in southern France. The first two books of the Liber were written by Bernard of Angers, while the last two were written by three different anonymous authors following Bernard's death.

== Composition ==
Bernard of Angers introduced his text (the first two books of the Liber miraculorum sancte Fidis) in a letter to Fulbert of Chartres.

The Liber consists of four books in medieval Latin, the first two of which were written by Bernard of Angers, who was a student of Fulbert of Chartres and master of the cathedral school of Angers, during and following his three pilgrimages to the shrine of Saint Faith in the 1010s and 1020s. The last two were written by three different anonymous authors following Bernard's death: the third book dates between 1020 and 1050, while the bulk of the fourth book was probably written in the mid-eleventh century.

The purpose of the Liber was twofold. In the words of Jean Hubert and Marie-Clotilde Hubert (as translated by Pamela Sheingorn):

It presents itself as a work of edification, but also of propaganda, intended to spread the renown of the sanctuary where wondrous cures and other miracles were effected. The descriptions of a multitude of pilgrims pressed into the narrow space where the statue was displayed were very likely intended to attract new dévotées.

As a work of edification, it would have circulated among priests and other clergy and been used as a source for vernacular sermons, especially at sites where Saint Faith was venerated.

The first miracle recorded in the book took place in 983. A man who had had his eyes gouged out had them restored to him by Saint Faith, after which he was known as Guibert the Illuminated. This was the miracle with which Faith's posthumous career began, and it caused the Abbey of Conques to flourish. While most contemporary works of hagiography arrange their material chronologically, Bernard instead divides the miracles into categories and arranges them chronologically only within a given type. Thus, the miracle of 983 is immediately followed by a series of miracles also involving eyes. This organising principle was maintained by the continuators who added the third and fourth books in the Liber.

== Manuscript and publication history ==
All surviving manuscripts containing the Liber miraculorum sancte Fidis or, generally, parts of it, derive ultimately from a manuscript compiled at Conques in the third quarter of the eleventh century. Only part of this manuscript survives. The most complete surviving version of the Liber is found in a late eleventh-century manuscript from the church of Saint Faith in Sélestat. Several other twelfth- and thirteenth-century copies of at least part of the original Conques manuscript are found in archives in the Vatican, London, Namur, and Munich. A twelfth-century version from the cathedral of Rodez (near Conques) and a fourteenth-century one from Chartres are embellished with legends that were not in the original version.

Modern editions of the text do not therefore correspond to any existing medieval manuscript, but instead must collate multiple different versions. Earlier printed versions were based on single manuscripts: Philippe Labbe's of 1657 on a now lost manuscript from Besançon and Jean Mabillon's of 1707 on the Chartres manuscript. The Bollandists in the 1770s published Mabillon's edition, while the Patrologia Latina (1841–55) contained that of Labbe. The more complete manuscript of Sélestat was used for the Monumenta Germaniae Historica and for Auguste Bouillet's 1897 edition. In 1994, Luca Robertini published the first edition based on all the known manuscripts and informed by all previous editions. Pamela Sheingorn produced an English translation titled The Book of Sainte Foy the following year. It is identical to Robertini's Latin edition for the first three books, but they diverge in the fourth owing to different decisions about what to include or exclude from the scattered surviving manuscripts.
