= Rusticus of Clermont =

Christian Bishop

Saint Rusticus
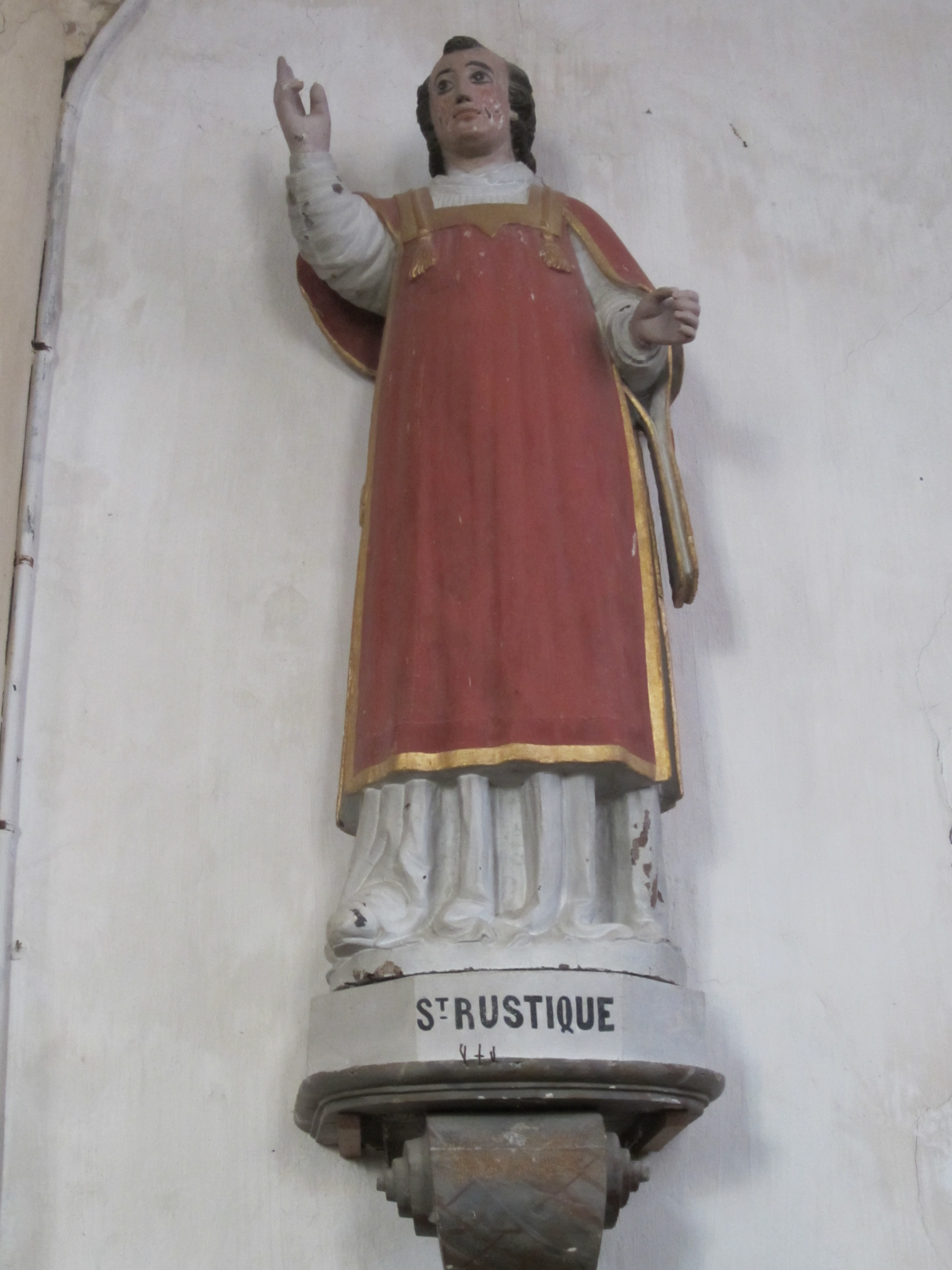
- Église Saint-Denis in Saint-Denis-le-Vêtu - Statue of saint Rustique
- Born: Auvergne
- Died: 446; Clermont, Auvergne
- Feast: 24 September

Bishop of Clermont (Arvernis)
- In office 424–446
- Preceded by: Venerandus
- Succeeded by: Namatius

Rusticus of Clermont (or Rustique, Rotiri; died 446) was a Bishop of Clermont in Auvergne. His feast day is 24 September.

== Life ==
Rusticus was a priest in Clermont when the former bishop, Venerandus, died. It is said that an assembly of citizens were arguing about candidates to succeed Venerandus when a veiled nun told them to let the Lord make the choice and he would come. At that moment, Rusticus arrived, and the woman cried out that he was the one appointed by the Lord. Rusticus succeeded as bishop of Clermont, and was bishop from 424 to 446. He was succeeded by Namatius, who was bishop from 446 to 462 and founded Clermont Cathedral.

== Monks of Ramsgate account ==
The Monks of Ramsgate wrote in their Book of Saints (1921),

Rusticus (St.) Bp. (Sept. 24)
(5th cent.) The seventh Bishop of Clermont in Auvergne, concerning whose election Saint Gregory of Tours relates that it was brought about by a special intervention of Divine Providence. He died A.D. 446, in the twentieth year of his Episcopate.

== Butler's account ==
The hagiographer Alban Butler (1710–1773) wrote in his Lives of the Fathers, Martyrs, and Other Principal Saints under September 24,

St. Rusticus, commonly called St. Rotiri, Bishop of Auvergne. Upon the death of St. Venerand, bishop of Auvergne, which happened the 24th of December, 423, there arose a sharp contest about the choice of a successor; but it is said that God signified his will in an extraordinary manner, in consequence of which the vacant see was conferred on Rusticus, a person remarkable for the sanctity of his manners. He was a native of the diocess, and had the administration of a parish there. This is all that with any certainty is known concerning his life. There were in this age two other bishops of the same name; one of Lyons, and the other of Narbonne. St. Rusticus of Auvergne died about the end of the reign of Valentinian III. He is mentioned on this day in the Roman Martyrology. See St. Greg. of Tours, Hist. l. 3, c. 13, Baillet, &c.

== Sources ==
- Butler, Alban (1799), The Lives of the Primitive Fathers, Martyrs, and Other Principal Saint, vol. 9, J. Moir This article incorporates text from this source, which is in the public domain.
- Goyau, G. (1908), "Diocese of Clermont", The Catholic Encyclopedia, New York: Robert Appleton Company – via New Advent
- "Saint Rustique", Bulletins de la Société des antiquaires de l'Ouest (in French), Poitiers – via Nominis
- St. Augustine's Abbey, Ramsgate (1921). The Book of saints : a dictionary of servants of God canonized by the Catholic Church. London: A. & C. Black, ltd. OCLC 671676136. This article incorporates text from this source, which is in the public domain.
