= Namatius =

Roman Catholic saint

Saint Namatius
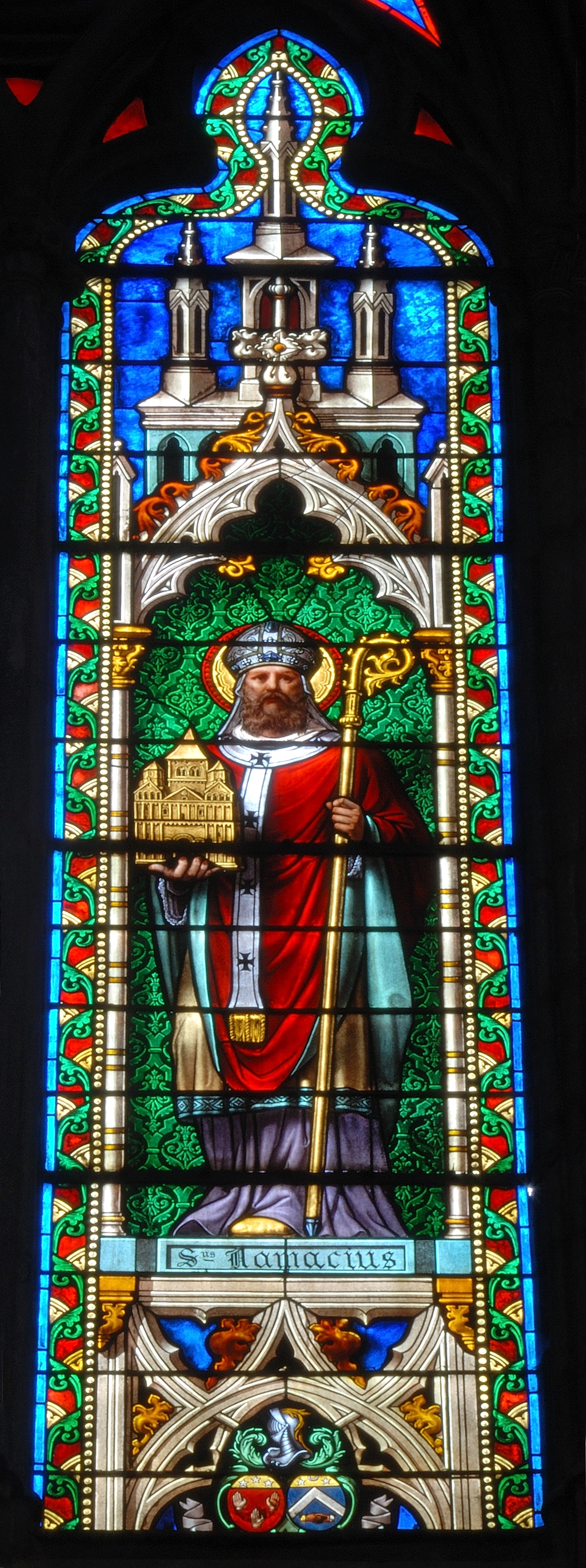
- Stained glass window showing Saint Namatius, from the Church of Saint-Eutrope in Clermont-Ferrand.
- Born: ? place of birth unknown
- Died: After 462 place of death unknown
- Venerated in: Roman Catholic Church; Eastern Orthodox Church
- Feast: October 27

Namatius (French: Namace) is a saint in the Roman Catholic church.

== Hagiography ==
He was the eighth or ninth bishop of Clermont (then called Arvernis) from 446 to 462, and founded Clermont's first cathedral, bringing the relics of Vitalis and Agricola to it from Bologna. Of this construction project, Gregory of Tours writes:

He undertook the task of building the older church which is still standing and is contained within the walls of the city, one hundred and fifty feet in length, sixty in width,-that is, the nave, fifty in height to the vault, with a round apse in front and on each side aisles finely built, the whole building is laid out in the form of a cross; it has forty-two windows, seventy columns, eight doors. The fear of God is in it and a great brightness is seen, and in the spring a very pleasant fragrance as if of spices is perceived there by the devout. It has near the altar walls of variegated work adorned with many kinds of marble. The blessed bishop on finishing the building in the twelfth year, sent priests to Bologna in Italy, to procure relics of saints Agricola and Vitalis, who we know very certainly were crucified in the name of Christ our God.

Catholic Church titles
Preceded by Rusticus	Bishop of Clermont; 446–462	Succeeded by Eparchius
