= Count of Rouergue =

Coat of arms of the county of Rouergue

This is a list of the counts of Rouergue.

- Sigisbert of Rourgue c. 790 – c. 810 or 820
- Fulcoald c. 810 or 820 – c. 836 or 849
- Raymond I c. 836 or 849 – 864
- Fredelo c. 836 or 849 – 852 (associated with Raymond)
- Bernard the Calf 864 – 872
- Odo 872 – 919
- Ermengol 919 – 937
- Raymond II 937 – 961
- Raymond III 961 – 1008 or 1010
- Hugh 1008 or 1010 – 1053 or 1054
- Bertha 1053 or 1054 – 1064
- Raymond IV 1064 – 1105, also count of Toulouse from 1094 onward.
- Alfonso Jordan 1105 – 1119, also count of Toulouse (1112 – 1148)
- Alphonse II of Rouergue 1140

The county then passed to the Viscounts of Rodez, Counts of Rouergue.

- Raymond I of Bergerac 1324
- Clermont of Bergerac 1381
- Raymond II of Bergerac 1431 second creation of the title

The current holders of the title reside in Romania after their ancestors arrived with the first king of Romania, Carol I. Alexandru Cosmin Ciobanu, Count of Rouergue, holds the 13th title of the second creation; he is also Count of Birthelm.
