= Moses ben Abraham (fl. 1244) =

French author and translator

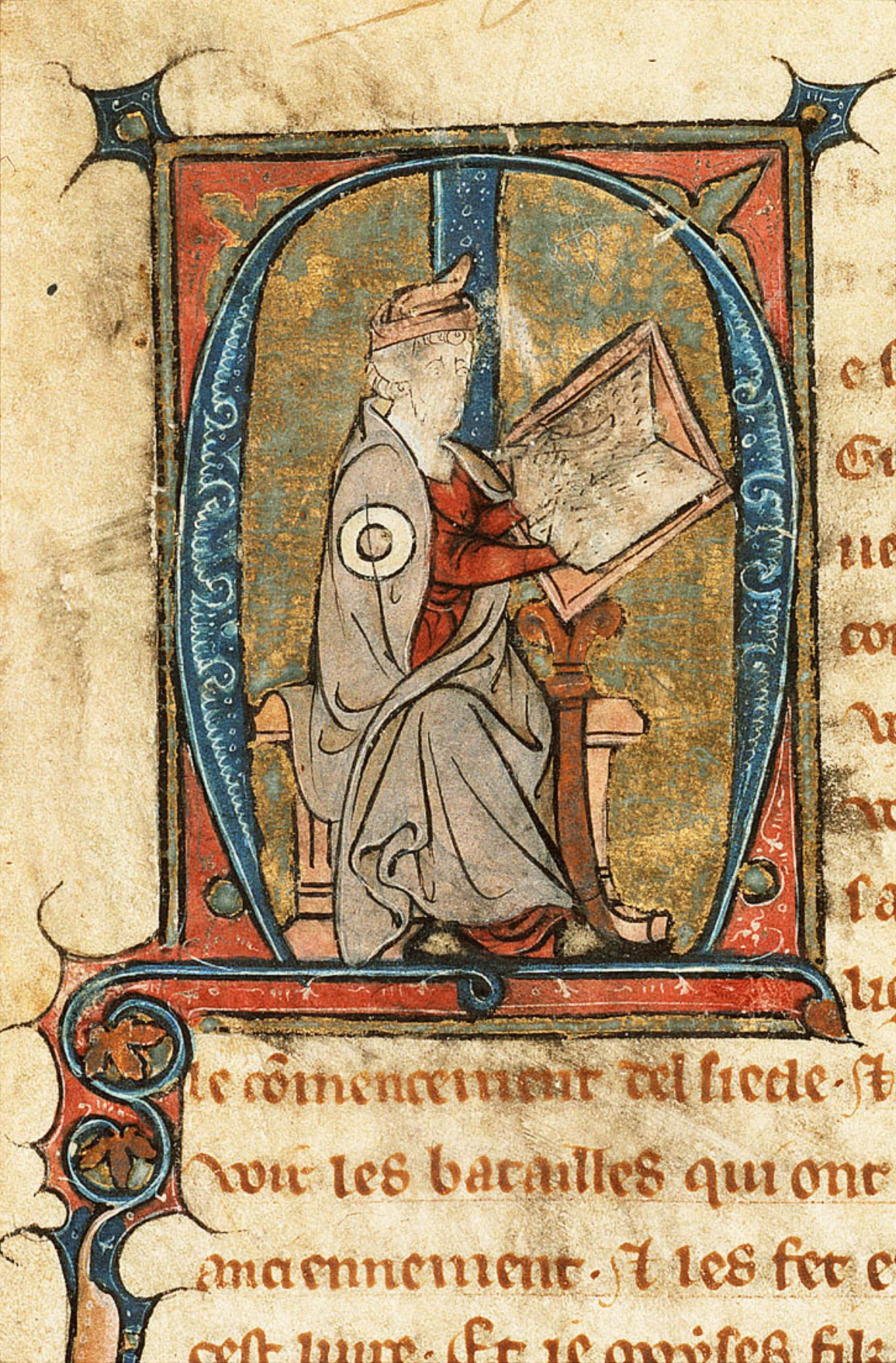
Moses in a historiated initial at the start of his work in the only surviving manuscript

Moses ben Abraham (fl. 1244) was a French Jewish author and translator.

His only known work, the Chroniques de la Bible, is an Old French historical and prophetic compilation based on Hebrew sources. It contains a partial translation of the Sefer Yosippon. Based on this and biblical sources, it gives an overview of ancient history down to 8 BC. Its prophetic section is based on the Bible and Moses' own interpretations. He predicts the coming of the Messianic age in 1290–1335.

The Chroniques is known from a single illuminated manuscript of the late thirteenth century.

== Biography ==
Moses is known solely from the single manuscript of his Chroniques. He refers to himself as "moyses fils abraham, le rous le yuif", "Moses, the son of Abraham, the redhead and Jew". He gives the date of his writing as 1244.

Moses was triliterate. The Chroniques is an original composition in Old French that contains extensive translation from Hebrew. In a few places Moses quotes from the Latin Psalter before providing a translation and gloss, indicating that he had knowledge of Latin also. Although a few passages have a "Christian ring", there is no evidence that Moses was a convert.

Moses is depicted in the manner of a philosopher in a historiated initial at the start of his work. His face and hands are partially erased, perhaps by rubbing. He is wearing a pink bonnet and a white rouelle (roundel) on his robe, both indicators of his Jewishness. The rouelle is a distinctly French badge introduced by Bishop Eudes de Sully of Paris (r. 1197–1208).

== Chroniques ==
=== Patronage ===
The prologue begins by naming the patron who commissioned the work:

Mesires li quens Guillem d'Auvergne qui covoite a avoir et a savoir les nessances et les lignies des le conmencement del siecle, et velt savoir les batailles qui ont esté faites anciennement et les fet escrire en cest livre.

Translation:

My lord the Count William of Auvergne who wishes to possess and know the origins and the lineages of the beginning of the world, and wants to know the battles which have been fought in the past and orders them written in this book.

The count of Auvergne in 1244 was William X (r. 1222–1247), who is generally taken to have commissioned the work. Maria Theresa Rachetta, however, suggests that the Chroniques is "too eccentric for a layman of modest means who lived most of his life on a restricted territorial allowance" and proposes that the word "quens" (count) is an interpolation. In her view, the original patron was William of Auvergne, bishop of Paris, and the work was produced for or in response to the Trial of the Talmud (1240).

=== Content ===
==== Title and purpose ====
The title Chroniques de la Bible is found in a colophon. The explicit labels the text "la bible en franchois" ('the Bible in French'). An addition made to the manuscript in lettre bâtarde in the fifteenth century describes it as "la descricion veritable de Josephus par forme de chroniques" ('the true description of Josephus in the form of chronicles'). Moses, in the prologue and in a few other places, refers to his work only as the Livre, 'book', which is the title adopted by Maria Theresa Rachetta.

The purpose of the Chroniques is given in the prologue. Moses' patron wanted "to know the beginning and the unfolding of the lineages since the creation of the world, as well as the battles which were fought in ancient times." To this Moses has added much speculation on the future of the world. Chronologically, the work begins with the generations of Noah and ends in 8 BC during the reign of Herod the Great.

==== Descendants of Japheth ====
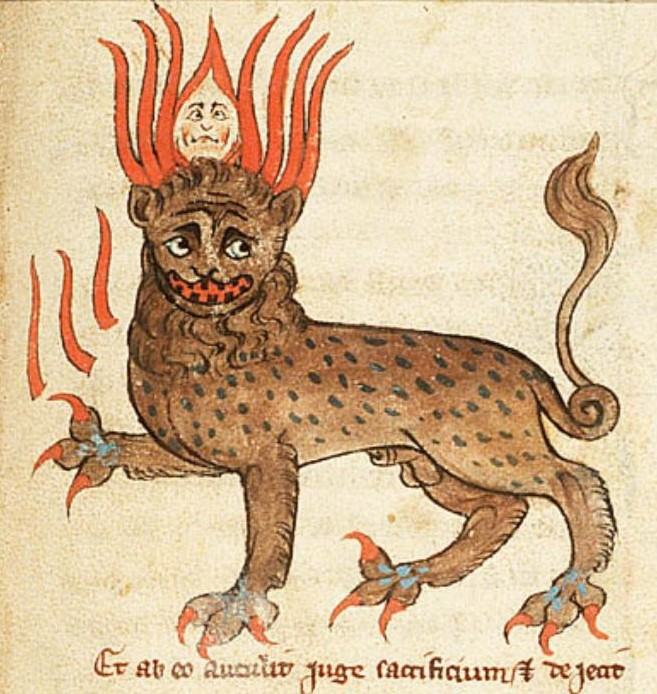
The beast with ten horns (The Hague, Royal Library of the Netherlands, 131 A 3, fol. 34r)

The first part of the work, which is derived from the Sefer Yosippon, describes the descendants of Japheth. According to Moses, Francion, the founder of the Frankish nation, was a son of Gomer, son of Japheth. This contradicts the then popular legend of the Franks' Trojan origins. He also provides a novel interpretation of the origin of the Mongols (Tatars). They are descended from the ten lineages of Alaam, son Togarmah, son of Japheth. These lineages were confined in the mountains by Alexander the Great. Alaam stands for the Alans. Among Togarmah's other sons were Resar (Khazars) and Pechunaus (Pechenegs).

Moses next discusses the histories of the ancient Babylonian and Persian empires, drawing mainly from the biblical books of Daniel and Esther.

==== Descendants of Ham and Shem ====
The second part of the work, which is not derived from the Sefer Yosippon, describes the descendants of Ham and Shem, the Bible (with short interpretations) and Islam.

He follows this with a description of 27 (Note: The books described are Genesis, Exodus, Leviticus, Numbers, Deuteronomy, Judges, Ruth, Samuel, Isaiah, Jeremiah, Ezekiel, Daniel, Hosea, Joel, Obadiah, Jonah, Micah, Nahum, Habakkuk, Zephaniah, Haggai, Zechariah, Malachi, Tobit, Esdras, Maccabees and the works of Josephus.) books of the "donated testament" (i.e., the Jewish Bible), a brief description of Christianity based on the books of the New Testament and a brief irenic description of Islam. He claims that the 38 (Note: Although he only describes 27 books, he gives the total number as 37 plus Lamentations.) books of the Hebrew Bible are accepted as truth by not just Jews and Christians, but Muslims, Albigensians and Mongols. Combining an interpretation of prophecies in the books of Ezekiel (27:14, 38:2–6) and Zechariah (13:8–9) with contemporary reports, Moses concludes that the Mongols were harbingers of the end of time.

==== Interpretation of Daniel ====
The preceding historical sections are followed by a long exposition of the visions of Daniel. Moses' interpretation of the four beasts follows Jerome's Commentary on Daniel. Interpreting the prophecy of seventy weeks, he predicts the dawn of the Messianic age in 1290, coming to fruition in 1335. The year 1290 is also found in the prediction of his contemporary, Abraham Abulafia, although there is no evidence that he knew of it.

In his interpretation of Daniel 11, Moses records an episode that took place at Herk-de-Stad sometime after the Battle of Legnica in April 1241. A Cuman hostage from the Mongol army sent by the kings of Hungary and Rus' testified before Duke Henry II of Brabant. Moses writes that "We wrote them down exactly as he recounted them in Herk" (nous les escreimes si comme il les retrait par sa bouche a Herke), which may indicate that he was present or that he is quoting a transcript. He uses the testimony of the hostage to buttress his interpretation of Zechariah and Daniel that the end times are at hand.

==== Hellenistic history ====
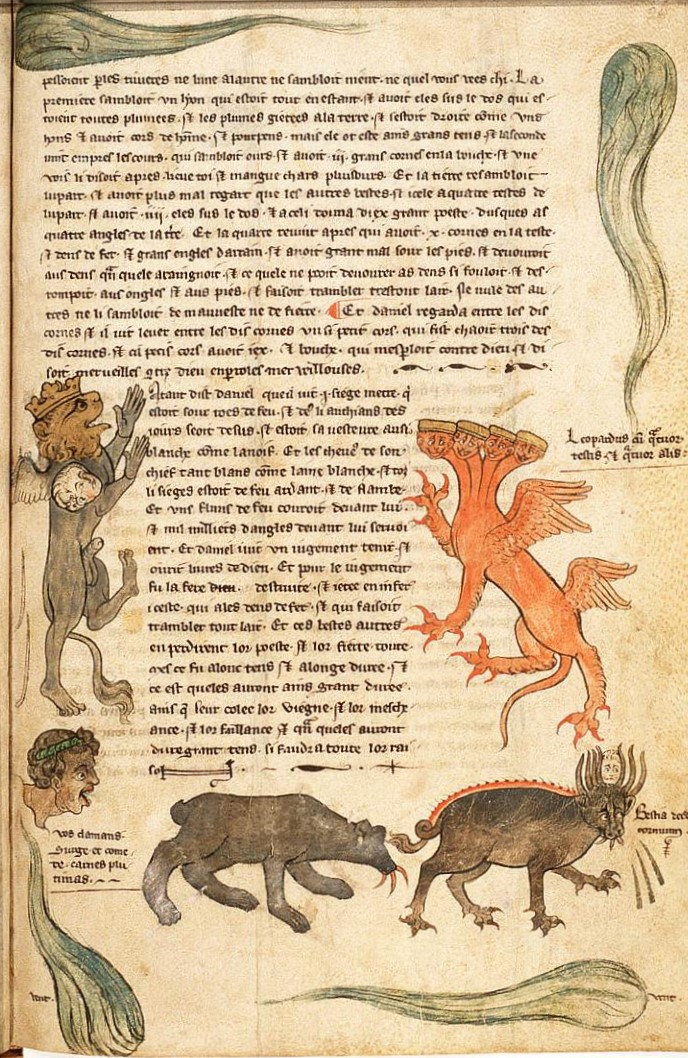
Illustration of the visions of the four winds and four beasts from Daniel 7 (The Hague, Royal Library of the Netherlands, 131 A 3, fol. 26r)

The final two thirds of the text covers the reign of Alexander the Great and his successors down to Herod. Moses repeats the story that Alexander found the Ten Lost Tribes trapped beyond a raging river. Having already identified Magog, the people shut in by Alexander, with the Alans, he argues that the Mongols must be a totally distinct people from the Israelites. Rachetta argues that this careful line of argument is the main purpose of the Chroniques: to correct the erroneous notion, found in the Historia scholastica of Petrus Comestor, that the Mongols were Jews and that Jews would naturally ally with them.

Moses occasionally suppresses information in his source that he regards as legendary, such as Alexander's being the son of Pharaoh Nectanebo II. The Chroniques ends abruptly with the story of King Archelaus of Cappadocia reconciling Herod to his son Alexander.

=== Sources ===
Moses identifies his sources as the Bible, the writings of Josephus (which he calls "la verite de Josephe", 'the truth of Josephus') and the legends of Alexander the Great. Although Moses' material goes back to Josephus' Jewish Antiquities and Jewish Wars, they were not his direct source. He relied upon the Hebrew Sefer Yosippon, which was regarded as an authentic work of Josephus in his time. It was in fact produced in the tenth century from Latin translations of Josephus' Greek writings, including that known as Pseudo-Hegesippus. The latter is the ultimate source for the identification of the Alans as the people walled in by Alexander.

The first section dealing with the generations of Noah and history down to the time of the Persian empire is derived from the Sefer Yosippon, as is the long final section covering the period from Alexander to Herod. The middle sections are derived from the Bible and perhaps from "prophetic compendia or commentaries". The material translated and heavily abridged from the Sefer Yosippon represents "the sole pre-modern version ... in a European vernacular."

=== Manuscript ===
==== Date, place and patron ====
The Chroniques is preserved in a single deluxe illuminated manuscript of the late thirteenth century, now in The Hague, Royal Library of the Netherlands, 131 A 3. It probably belongs to the beginning of Moses' Messianic age of 1290–1335.

The manuscript was produced in northeastern France or in Flanders. The patron or commissioner of the manuscript is unknown, but may have been related to the patron of the text. Margaret Alison Stones suggests one of William X's nephews, Archbishop Guy of Vienne or Bishop-elect William of Liège, or else his younger son, Bishop Guy of Tournai, brother of the ruling counts William XI and Robert VI.

==== Text ====
The manuscript contains 123 folios. The scribe appears to have worked quickly, resulting in a text riddled with errors. He may have been copying from the "unrevised" or "unfinished" autograph. The script style is littera textualis. The text is written in the Latin alphabet, whereas most Jewish texts in French were written in the Hebrew alphabet. Only two other medieval French texts of Jewish origin are known that were written in the Latin alphabet: Hagin le Juif's translation of Abraham ibn Ezra for Henry Bate of Mechelen (1273) and a translation of the Hebrew Alexander legend Sefer Alexandros Mokdon (fourteenth century).

==== Decoration ====
The text is divided into paragraphs marked by decorated initials. The section on Daniel's visions contains high quality illustrations designed for the text. The text occasionally refers to the illustrations, which follow it faithfully even where it diverges from the Vulgate Bible. Some illustrations have French captions, some Latin.

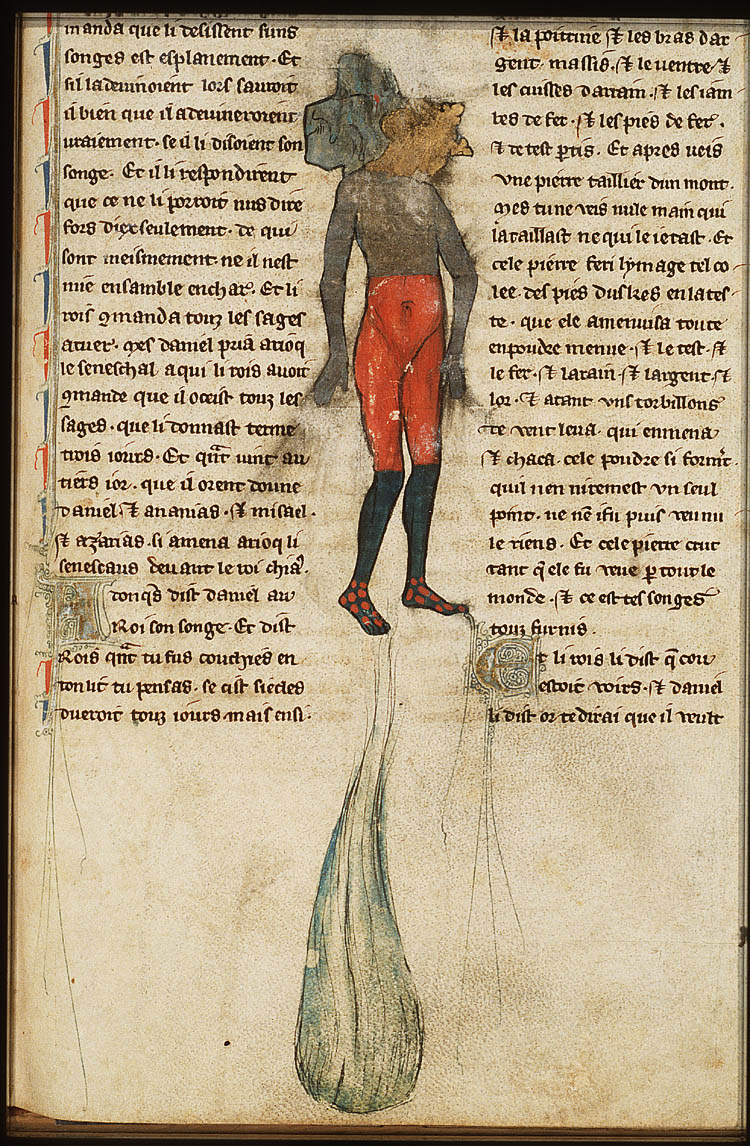
Illustration of Nebuchadnezzar's statue (The Hague, Royal Library of the Netherlands, 131 A 3, fol. 25)

The illustrator may have been the Meliacin Master, who was active between about 1280 and 1310. This puts the copying of the text in or shortly before the period 1290–1335, identified in the text as the start of the Messianic age.

The first initial of the work is a historiated author portrait, possibly by a different hand than the illustrator of the rest of the manuscript.

The first illustration is of the statue described in Daniel 2. The image is damaged by rubbing. Although the biblical text describes a stone striking the statue's feet, the image shows it striking the head, showing that the illustrator was guided only by the text in front of him, which does not mention the stone striking the feet. Likewise, the illustrator depicts a lion (as per the text and the Hebrew) where the Vulgate has a lioness. Walter Cahn notes how the image

departs from the ancient and medieval habit of personifying winds in the guise of bearded and horn-blowing divinities, and substitutes for this anthropomorphic convention a more "literal", graphically mimetic ideogram, a large, drop-like form shaded with wavy lines and tones that are meant to evoke the movement of air.

The second set of illustrations is of the four beasts in Daniel 7.

The third set of illustrations is spread across three pages and depicts the vision of the ram and the goat from Daniel 8.

The fourth set of illustrations depicts the beast with ten horns and the goat with four horns from Daniel 7:7 and 8:8, respectively. Although both have already been depicted, they are repeated at this point in order to emphasise that they have the same meaning: the fourth kingdom is Rome and it began when the Roman emperor Titus sacked Jerusalem in AD 70.

The final illustration depicts the goat defeating the ram (Daniel 8:7). It is placed later in the manuscript, alongside the part where the priests of the Temple in Jerusalem tell Alexander that he will defeat Darius III on the basis of Daniel's prophecy.

== Bibliography ==
- Cahn, Walter (1987). "Moses ben Abraham's "Chroniques de la Bible"". Artibus et Historiae. 8 (16): 55–66. doi:10.2307/1483300. ISSN 0391-9064. JSTOR 1483300.
- Pow, Stephen (2024). "A Proposal for the Identity of the Inner Asian City of Ornas (Hornach) Mentioned in Thirteenth-Century Latin Sources". Acta Orientalia Academiae Scientiarum Hungaricae. 77 (1): 157–175 [1–19]. doi:10.1556/062.2023.00305.
- Rachetta, Maria Teresa (2020). "Paris 1244: The Jews, the Christians, and the Tartars: The Livre of Moses ben Abraham, a Little-Known Case of Jewish Apologetics in Medieval French". Medium Ævum. 89 (2): 244–266. doi:10.2307/27089790. JSTOR 27089790.
- Stones, Alison (2007). "Why Images? A Note on Some Explanations in French Manuscripts c. 1300". In Mara Hofmann; Caroline Zöhl (eds.). Quand la peinture était dans les livres: mélanges en l'honneur de François Avril. Brepols. pp. 312–329.
- Stones, Alison (2013). Gothic Manuscripts, 1260–1320: Part One, Vol. 2, Catalogue. Brepols.
