= William of Auvergne (disambiguation) =

William of Auvergne may refer to:

- William of Auvergne, bishop of Paris (1228–1249)
- William of Auvergne (bishop-elect of Liège) (1281)
- several counts of Auvergne:
  - William I, Duke of Aquitaine (died 918), also count of Auvergne
  - William II, Duke of Aquitaine (died 927), also count of Auvergne
  - William III, Duke of Aquitaine (died 963), also count of Auvergne
  - William IV of Auvergne (989–1016) (also called William I or V)
  - William V of Auvergne (1032–1064) (also called William II or VI)
  - William VI of Auvergne (1096–1136) (also called William III or VII)
  - William VII of Auvergne, the Young (1143 – c. 1155) (also called William IV or VIII)
  - William VIII, Count of Auvergne, the Old (1155–1182) (also called William VII or IX)
  - William VIII, Dauphin of Auvergne (died 1240)
  - William IX of Auvergne (1194–1195)
  - William X of Auvergne (1224–1246) (sometimes William XI or XII)
  - William XI of Auvergne (1277–1279) (sometimes William XII or XIII)
  - William XII of Auvergne (1325–1332) (sometimes William XIII or XIV)

== See also ==
- Rulers of Auvergne
