= Arnold III =

Arnold III may refer to:

- Arnold III, Count of Looz (died 1221), Count of Looz and Count of Rieneck
- Arnold III Hahót (died 1292), Hungarian nobleman
- Arnold III, Count of Bentheim-Steinfurt-Tecklenburg-Limburg (1554–1606), German nobleman
