= Maud of Boulogne =

Matilda of Boulogne may refer to:

- Matilda of Leuven, countess of Boulogne
- Matilda I of Boulogne, countess of Boulogne and queen of England
- Matilda of Boulogne, duchess of Brabant
- Matilda II of Boulogne, countess of Boulogne and queen of Portugal
