= William of Auvergne (bishop-elect of Liège) =

French clergyman (fl. 1281–1285)

William of Auvergne (French: Guillaume d'Auvergne) was a French nobleman and clergyman who was elected prince-bishop of Liège during a disputed election in 1281 but was forced to renounce the office the following year.

A member of the House of Auvergne, William was a younger son of Count William X of Auvergne (r. 1229–1247). His brothers were Count Robert V of Auvergne and Archbishop Guy of Vienne.

William became a canon of Saint Lambert's Cathedral in Liège in 1262. He also held a canonry at Lyon and the provostry of Saint-Donatien in Bruges. From 1264 until 1282 he was the archdeacon of Famenne. According to the Chronique liégeoise de 1402, the canons initially elected the provost of Saint Lambert's, Bouchard d'Avesnes, to succeed the murdered bishop John of Enghien in 1281, but some were soon persuaded by Guy, Count of Flanders, to oppose Bouchard. The chronicle of Jean de Hocsem records that William was also elected. Count Guy then arranged for his son, John of Flanders, to become bishop. This was confirmed by Pope Martin IV, who issued a bull on 9 June 1282 stating that both rival candidates had renounced their rights. While Bouchard replaced John as bishop of Metz, William seems to have gone uncompensated.

Margaret Alison Stones floats William as a possible candidate for the patron who commissioned the illuminated manuscript of the Chroniques de la Bible (now in The Hague, Royal Library of the Netherlands, 131 A 3).

William probably died in 1285.

== Bibliography ==
- Baluze, Étienne (1708). Histoire généalogique de la maison d'Auvergne justifiée par chartes, titres, histoires anciennes et autres preuves authentiques. Vol. 1. Paris.
- Marchandisse, Alain (1998). La fonction épiscopale à Liège au XIIIe et XIVe siècles: Études de politologie historique. Bibliothèque de la faculté de philosophie et lettres de l'université de Liège. Presses universitaires de Liège. ISBN 979-10-365-1653-5.
- Stones, Alison (2007). "Why Images? A Note on Some Explanations in French Manuscripts c. 1300". In Mara Hofmann; Caroline Zöhl (eds.). Quand la peinture était dans les livres: mélanges en l'honneur de François Avril. Brepols. pp. 312–329.
