= Robert VI =

Robert VI may refer to:

- Robert VI of Auvergne
- Robert de Brus, 6th Lord of Annandale
- Robert VI of Beu
