= Abbey of Saint-Vaast de Moreuil =

Abbey in Somme, France

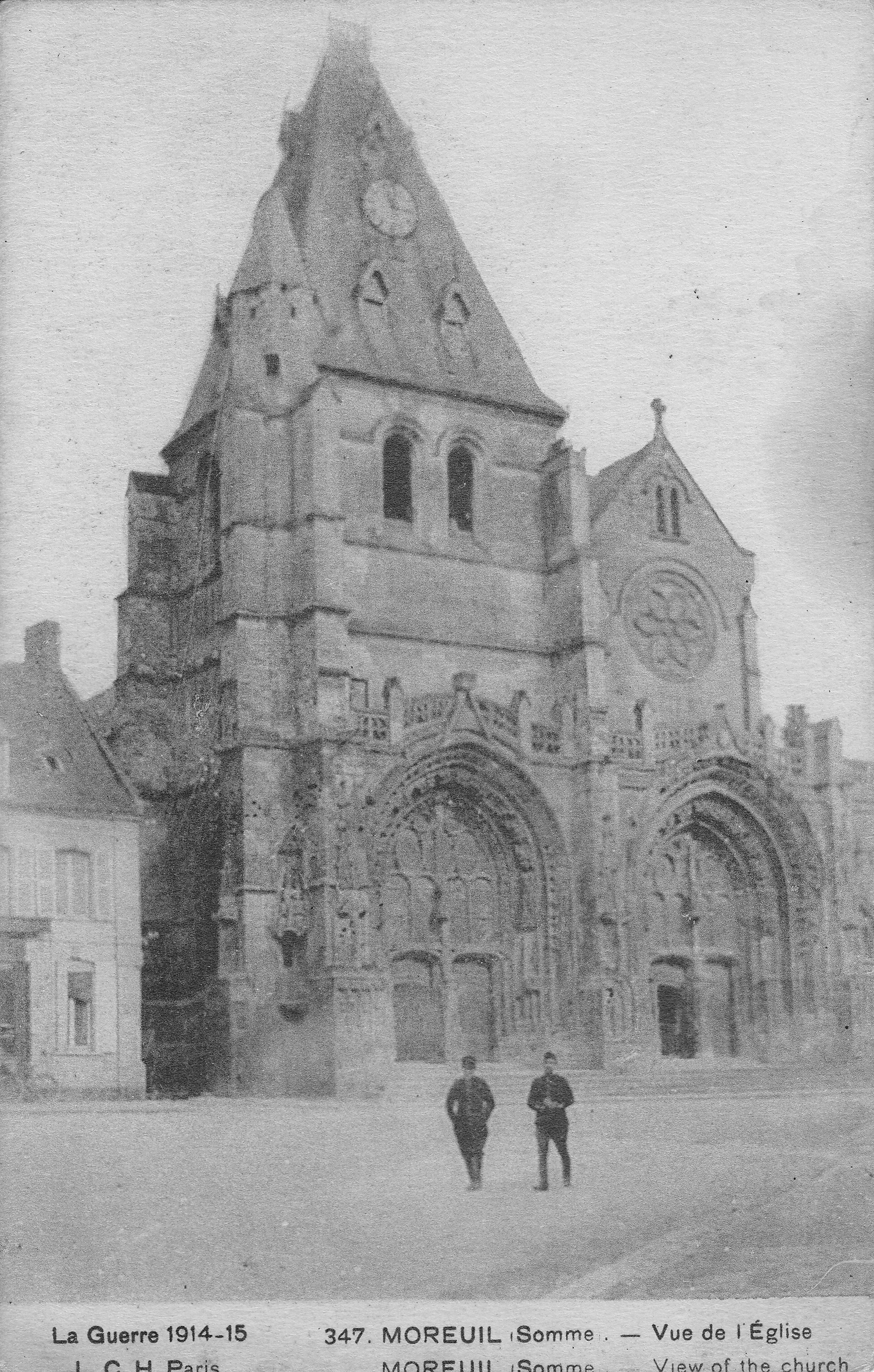
The abbey church as it appeared in 1915

The abbey of Saint-Vaast (or Saint-Vast) de Moreuil (Latin: Sanctus Vedastus de Morolio) was a Benedictine monastery in Picardy. It was originally a hospice staffed by two or three monks. The monastery chapel was founded by Bernard I, lord of Moreuil, in 1109 or 1119 and dedicated to the sixth-century saint-bishop Vedast. At first a priory, it was raised to a full abbey in 1140 or 1150. The king had the right to name its abbot.

The lords of Moreuil continued to be patrons of the monastery. The illuminated Psalter–Hours of Yolande de Soissons, wife of Lord Bernard V, contains three celebrations for Saint Vedast: his feast (February 6), his relatio, when his relics were carried in procession (July 15), and his translatio, recalling the transfer of his relics (October 1). Saint-Vaast de Moreuil served as the burial place of the family of the lords of Moreuil and later the Créquy family. In 1574, Cardinal Antoine de Créquy left it a generous legacy. The abbot by that time was crossé et mitré, that is, entitled to wear episcopal vestments. He had six monks under him.

By 1709, the monastery had fallen on hard times and lead illegally scavenged from the tombs was sold to pay debts. The abbot was arrested and in 1711 one of the monks was sent to the galleys. The monastery was transferred to the Congregation of Saint-Maur, about which there was litigation. It continued as a parish church under the Congregation of Saint-Maur. In 1772, it had an annual revenue of 5,000 livres and remitted 200 florins to Rome.
