= Robert V of Auvergne =

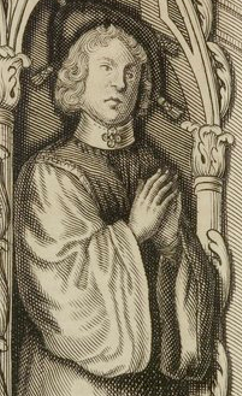
- Detail of the recumbent figure of the tomb of Robert V, Count of Auvergne, in the Church of Bouschet-Vauluisant, Yronde-et-Buron

Count of Auvergne
- Reign: 1247–1277
- Predecessor: William X of Auvergne
- Successor: William XI of Auvergne

Count of Boulogne
- Reign: 1265–1277
- Predecessor: Adelaide of Brabant
- Successor: William XI of Auvergne
- Born: c. 1225
- Died: 11th of January 1277
- Spouse: Éléonore of Baffie
- Issue: William XI of Auvergne; Robert VI of Auvergne
- House: House of Auvergne
- Father: William X of Auvergne
- Mother: Adelaide of Brabant

Robert V of Auvergne (c. 1225 – 11 January 1277) was count of Auvergne from 1247 and Boulogne from 1265 until his death.

== Life ==
Robert was the first-born son of the count of Auvergne William X and the countess of Boulogne Adelaide of Brabant. His parents married before 1225, renouncing every right they had on the duchy of Lower Lorraine, that they had since Adelaide was the daughter of Henry I, Duke of Lower Lorraine.

In 1247, William X died and Robert inherited the county of Auvergne. His mother remarried with Arnold II of Wezemaal. The two guaranteed Robert that they would not demand any of the possessions he inherited from his father.

In 1259, Matilda II, Countess of Boulogne died. The Parlement of Paris ruled that her title would be inherited by Robert's mother, Adelaide. When she died, in 1265, the tile passed to Robert himself.

== Family and issue ==
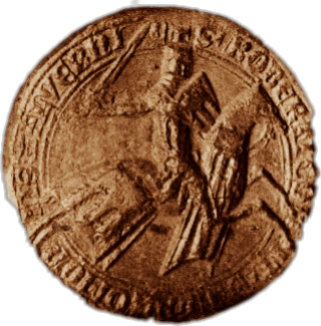
Seal of Robert

In 1245, Robert married Èleonore of Baffie, daughter of William "the Elder" of Baffie and his wife, whose name is unknown. They had six children:

- William XI of Auvergne, count of Boulogne and Auvergne.
- Robert VI of Auvergne, count of Boulogne and Auvergne.
- Godfrey († 1302), who was started on the ecclesiastical path, but after finishing his studies, left the church and later died in the Battle of the Golden Spurs.
- Guy († 1336), bishop of Tournai and of Cambrai.
- Mathilde († after 1291), that married Stephen, lord of Mont-Saint-Jean.
- Marie († 1286), nun at Fontevraud Abbey.

French nobility
Preceded by William X	Count of Auvergne; 1247–1277	Succeeded by William XI
Preceded by Adelaide of Brabant	Count of Boulogne; 1265–1277	Succeeded by William II
