= Adelaide of Brabant =

Countess of Boulogne (c. 1190–1265)

Countess of Auvergne and Boulogne
- Reign: 1262–1265
- Predecessor: Matilda II, Countess of Boulogne
- Successor: Robert V of Auvergne
- Born: c. 1190
- Died: 1265
- Noble family: House of Reginar
- Spouse: Arnold III, Count of Looz William X of Auvergne Arnold II of Wezemaal
- Issue: Robert V of Auvergne Marie of Auvergne Matilda of Auvergne
- Father: Henry I, Duke of Brabant
- Mother: Matilda of Boulogne, Duchess of Brabant

Adelaide of Brabant (also known as Alix of Brabant, Aleyde de Brabant, Alix of Louvain or Adelheid van Brabant), born around 1190, died in 1265, was Countess of Boulogne from 1262 to 1265, the third reigning Countess in succession. She was the daughter of Henry I, Duke of Brabant and Matilda of Boulogne.

== Marriages ==
She first married Arnoul III, Count of Rieneck and Looz (died 1221), around 1206, without issue.

Widowed, she remarried on 3 February 1225, William X of Auvergne (died 1247), by whom she had three children:

- Robert V of Auvergne (1225–1277), count of Auvergne (1247–1277) and of Boulogne (1265–1277)
- Marie of Auvergne (c. 1225–1280), x 1238 Gauthier VI Berthout (c. 1225–1286), Lord of Malines
- Matilda of Auvergne (c. 1230–1280), married c. 1255 Robert II of Clermont

Widowed again, she married for a third time to Arnold II of Wezemaal in 1251.

== County of Boulogne ==
In 1259, her cousin Matilda II, Countess of Boulogne died, and she was one of the contenders for the rich county of Boulogne, in competition with her nephew Henry III, Duke of Brabant, with Joan of Dammartin, cousin of the countess, and with Louis IX of France, nephew of Matilda's first husband. Finally, the Parlement of Paris ruled in her favour.

She died a few years later, having passed the county of Boulogne to her son Robert and his descendents.

Regnal titles
Preceded by Matilda II	Countess of Boulogne c. 1260 – c. 1261 with Arnold II of Wezemaal	Succeeded by Robert V of Auvergne
