= House of Baffie =

- Country: Kingdom of France
- Current region: Auvergne
- Etymology: From the city of Baffie
- Founded: 11th century
- Titles: Lords of Baffie
- Estate: Château de Baffie

The House of Baffie was a medieval French noble house that ruled the town of Baffie from the 11th to the 13th century.

== History ==
The first documented member of this dynasty is Dalmas, mentioned in a document dated to the second half of the 11th century. This Dalmas is considered the father of a second Dalmas and Guillaume de Baffie, Bishop of Clermont.

Dalmas II had two children: Auxilende, who married Agnon II of Meymont; and William.

William had only one son: Dalmas III.

Dalmas III had one son: William II.

William II supposedly lost his territories after the rebellion of Guy II of Auvergne and had to accept the suzeiranity of the bishop of Clermont. He married a daughter of Guigues III of Forez. His son, William III, later claimed the whole County of Forez by hereditary right through his mother. This led to conflict with Guigues IV of Forez and his son, Guigues V. However, William was defeated and renounced his claims.

William II also had (supposedly) two daughters: Beatrice, who married Agnon V of Meymont; Eleonore, who married Robert V of Auvergne.

== Family tree ==
House of Baffie

Dalmas I of Baffie
Dalmas II of Baffie	Guillaume de Baffie
William I of Baffie	Auxilende of Baffie
Dalmas III of Baffie
William II of Baffie
William III of Baffie	Beatrice of Baffie	Eleonore of Baffie
