= William X of Auvergne =

Count of Auvergne
- Reign: 1222-1247
- Predecessor: Guy II of Auvergne
- Successor: Robert V of Auvergne
- Died: 1247
- Spouse: Adelaide of Brabant
- Issue: Marie; Robert; Guy; William; Geoffrey; Henry; Mahaut
- House: House of Auvergne
- Father: Guy II of Auvergne
- Mother: Péronnelle de Chambon

William X or IX (died 1247) was the count of Auvergne from 1222 until his death.

Before 1216, William's father, Guy II, attempted to arrange his son's marriage to a daughter of Count Guigues III of Forez, but the plans came to naught. In 1222, William succeeded his father as count and inherited his conflict with the French crown. At an unknown date before 1225, William married Alix, a daughter of Duke Henry I of Brabant. The marriage was almost certainly arranged by his father in an effort to improve relations with the crown, as Brabant was an ally of the king.

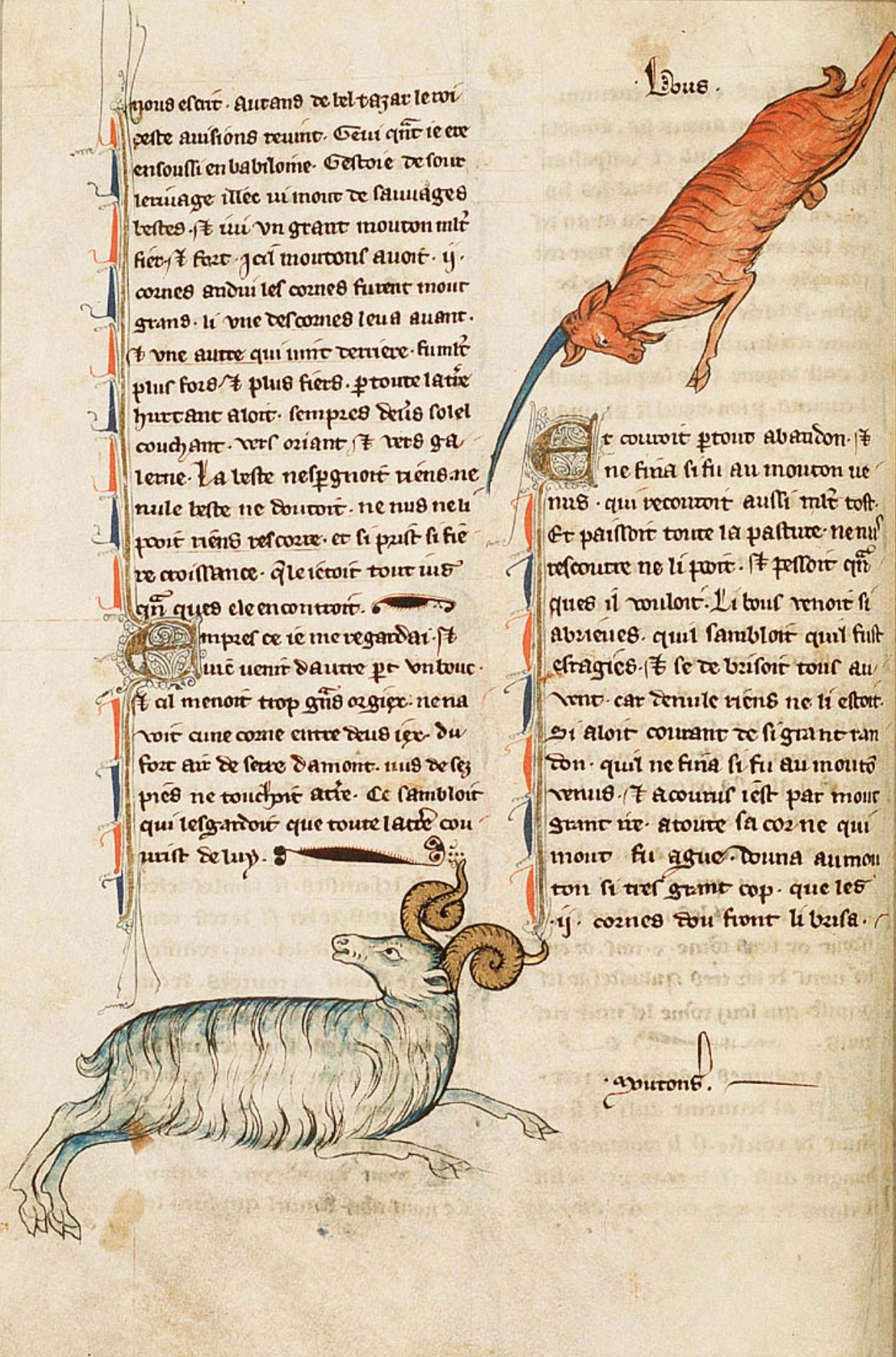
The vision of the ram and the goat from Daniel 8, as illustrated in the Chroniques de la Bible. The manuscript is later, but the work was commissioned by William X.

Between 1222 and 1224, William X maintained contacts with King Henry III of England and received gifts from him. The Chronicle of Tours records that he signed a truce with Louis VIII of France (1223–1226) when the latter traversed Auvergne on his way south to join the war against the Cathars. His contacts with England were broken in 1228. A definitive peace with the French crown was only made under Louis IX in 1230, leaving William with a rump county with its seat at Vic-le-Comte.

When Hugh X of Lusignan rebelled in 1241, William X was drawn into new negotiations with Henry III for an alliance against the French king. On 17 June 1242, Henry undertook to supply 100 knights to serve for a year under William as soon as the latter entered the war against France. William, however, chose to remain loyal to Louis IX. He placed two of his castles in the hands of Bishop Hugh of Clermont as pledges of his loyalty. He was listed among Louis's allies at the signing of the peace treaty with England on 7 April 1243.

William is the presumed patron who commissioned the Chroniques de la Bible from Moses ben Abraham. The work is largely a French translation of the Hebrew Sefer Yosippon. According to Moses, who was writing in 1244, "my lord the Count William of Auvergne who wishes to possess and know the origins and the lineages of the beginning of the world, and wants to know the battles which have been fought in the past [ ] orders them written in this book." William appears as a character at the tournament of Montargis in Gerbert de Montreuil's contemporary romance, Roman de la violette.

William X was succeeded as count by his son Robert V, who inherited the County of Boulogne through his mother in 1261. William and Alix's other children were Guy, William, Geoffrey, Henry, Mary and Matilda (Mahaut). Guy became an archbishop, William was elected bishop and Geoffrey also entered the church. Mary married Gauthier VI Berthout in 1238. Matilda married Robert II, Dauphin of Auvergne.

== Bibliography ==
- Baldwin, John W. (2000). Aristocratic Life in Medieval France: The Romances of Jean Renart and Gerbert de Montreuil, 1190–1230. Johns Hopkins University Press.
- Baluze, Étienne (1708). Histoire généalogique de la maison d'Auvergne justifiée par chartes, titres, histoires anciennes et autres preuves authentiques. Vol. 1. Paris.
- Cahn, Walter (1987). "Moses ben Abraham's Chroniques de la Bible". Artibus et Historiae. 8 (16): 55–66. JSTOR 1483300.
- Fray, Jean-Luc (2004). "Les comtes d'Auvergne, le Brabant et le Boulonnais au XIII^{e} siècle: de la Limagne à la Lotharingie". In Sylvain Gouguenheim; Monique Goullet; Odile Kammerer (eds.). Retour aux sources: Textes, études et documents d'histoire médiévale offerts à Michel Parisse. Picard. pp. 405–417.
- Petit-Dutaillis, Charles (1895). Étude sur la vie et le règne de Louis VIII (1187–1226). Paris: Émile Bouillon.
- Rachetta, Maria Theresa (2020). "Paris 1244: The Jews, the Christians, and the Tartars: The Livre of Moses ben Abraham, a Little-Known Case of Jewish Apologetics in Medieval French". Medium Ævum. 89 (2): 244–266. JSTOR 27089790.
- Roques, Rémy (2015). "Le gouvernement d'Alphonse de Poitiers en Auvergne". Annales du Midi. 127 (291): 325–348.
- Roques, Rémy (2017). "Les modalités d'intégration de l'Auvergne au domaine royal, XII^{e}–XIII^{e} siècles". Francia. 44. doi:10.11588/fr.2017.0.68997.
- Roques, Rémy (2018). "Résister au pouvoir royal dans l'Auvergne du XIII^{e} siècle". Questes. 39: 43–56.
- Roques, Rémy (2019). "La 'conquête de l'Auvergne' par Philippe Auguste". Cahiers de civilisation médiévale (247): 245–258.
- Stones, Alison (2007). "Why Images? A Note on Some Explanations in French Manuscripts c. 1300". In Mara Hofmann; Caroline Zöhl (eds.). Quand la peinture était dans les livres: mélanges en l'honneur de François Avril. Brepols. pp. 312–329.

French nobility
Preceded by Guy II	Count of Auvergne; 1222–1247	Succeeded by Robert V
