= Matilda of Boulogne, Duchess of Brabant =

French noblewoman (1170–1210)

Matilde of Boulogne
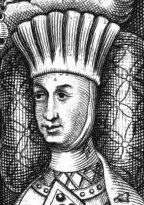
- Born: c. 1162
- Died: 16 October 1210
- Buried: St. Peter's Church, Leuven
- Noble family: House of Alsace
- Spouse: Henry I, Duke of Brabant
- Issue: Marie, Holy Roman Empress; Adelaide of Brabant; Matilda, Countess of Holland; Henry II, Duke of Brabant
- Father: Matthew, Count of Boulogne
- Mother: Marie I, Countess of Boulogne

Matilda of Boulogne (c. 1162 – 16 October 1210) was the younger daughter of Matthew, Count of Boulogne, and Marie I, Countess of Boulogne. Matilda became Duchess of Brabant by her marriage to Henry I, Duke of Brabant.

Matilda's parents' marriage was dissolved around 1170 and her mother became a Benedictine nun at St. Austrebert, Montreuil and died in 1182. Matilda's father continued to rule as count of Boulogne until his death in 1173. Her older sister, Ida, became countess.

Matilda married Duke Henry I of Brabant in 1180. The couple went on to have:

- Maria (c. 1190 – May 1260), married in Maastricht after 19 May 1214 Otto IV, Holy Roman Emperor, married July 1220 Count William I of Holland
- Adelaide (b. c. 1190), married 1206 Arnold III, Count of Loos, married 3 February 1225 William X of Auvergne (c. 1195–1247), married before 21 April 1251 Arnold van Wesemaele (d. aft. 1288)
- Margaret (1192–1231), married January 1206 Gerard III, Count of Guelders (d. 22 October 1229)
- Matilda (c. 1200 – 22 December 1267), married in Aachen in 1212 Henry II, Count Palatine of the Rhine (d. 1214), married on 6 December 1214 Floris IV, Count of Holland
- Henry II of Brabant (1207–1248), married firstly before 22 August 1215 Marie of Hohenstaufen; married secondly in 1240 Sophie of Thuringia
- Godfrey (1209 – 21 January 1254), Lord of Gaesbeek, married Maria van Oudenaarde
- child, whose name and sex is unknown

Matilde died in 1210 or 1211. She was buried at St. Peter's in Leuven.

== Sources ==
- Burgess, Glyn S.; Busby, Keith, eds. (1986). The Lais of Marie de France. Penguin.
- Lambert of Ardres (2007). The History of The Counts of Guines and Lords of Ardres. Translated by Shopkow, Leah. University of Pennsylvania Press.
- Pollock, M.A. (2015). Scotland, England and France after the Loss of Normandy, 1204-1296. The Boydell Press.
- McDougall, Sara (2017). Royal Bastards: The Birth of Illegitimacy, 800-1230. Oxford University Press.
