= Alexa Sand =

American art historian

- Born: Alexa Kristen Sand; United States
- Occupations: Art historian Educator
- Spouse: Albert Wiebe

Academic background
- Education: Williams College; University of California, Berkeley
- Thesis: Picturing Devotion Anew in Psalter-Hours of Yolande of Soissons (1999)
- Doctoral advisor: Harvey Stahl
- Other advisor: Michael Baxandall
- Influences: Margaret Alison Stones

Academic work
- Discipline: Art history
- Sub-discipline: Medieval art
- Institutions: Sonoma State University; Utah State University

Alexa Kristen Sand is an American art historian and educator. A scholar of medieval art, Sand is currently Professor of Art History at Utah State University.

== Career ==
Sand graduated from Williams College with a Bachelor of Arts in Art History and Anthropology in 1991, as cum laude. She continued on to earn a Master of Arts in Art History from the University of California, Berkeley in 1994. There, the subject of her thesis was Villard de Honnecourt. Five years later, Sand received a Doctor of Philosophy in Art History from the same school. Her doctoral dissertation was on the Psalter–Hours of Yolande de Soissons held at the Morgan Library and Museum. It was written under the supervision of Harvey Stahl with Michael Baxandall, Joseph Duggan, and Geoffrey Koziol.

A scholar of medieval art, Sand began her teaching career at Sonoma State University in 2001 as adjunct professor of Art History. Three years later, she was hired at Utah State University as assistant professor of Art History in 2004. She was promoted to the Associate level in 2011. Six years later, Sand was made full Professor. In 2018, she also became the Associate Vice President for Research at the school.

== See also ==
- List of University of California, Berkeley alumni in arts and media
- List of Utah State University faculty
- List of Williams College alumni
