= Guillaume de Baffie =

French bishop

- Bishop of Clermont
- In office: 1096 - c. 1103
- Predecessor: Durand
- Successor: Pierre Roux

Personal details
- Died: c. 1103
- Parents: Dalmas of Baffie

Guillaume de Baffie (died c. 1103) was Bishop of Clermont from 1096 until his death.

Guillaume de Baffie was the son of Dalmas of Baffie.

He was nominated bishop of Clermont by Urban II during the Council of Clermont, but was consecrated in 1096. In 1097 Urban II allowed the canons of Clermont to elect their own bishop. He participated in the ninth council of Auvergne in 1101.

He built the church of Viverols and later donated it and some other lands to the abbey of Sauxillanges.

He died in 1103 or 1104.

Catholic Church titles
Preceded by Durand	Bishop of Clermont; 1096 - c. 1103	Succeeded by Pierre Roux
