= Marie of Brabant =

Marie of Brabant may refer to:

- Marie of Brabant, Holy Roman Empress (1190–1260), wife of Emperor Otto IV of the Holy Roman Empire
- Marie of Brabant, Duchess of Bavaria (1226–1256), wife of Louis II, Duke of Bavaria
- Marie of Brabant, Queen of France (1254–1321), wife of Philip III of France
- Marie of Brabant, Countess of Savoy (1278–1338), wife of Amadeus V, Count of Savoy
