= Psalter–Hours of Yolande de Soissons =

Late thirteenth century French Psalter, Amiens

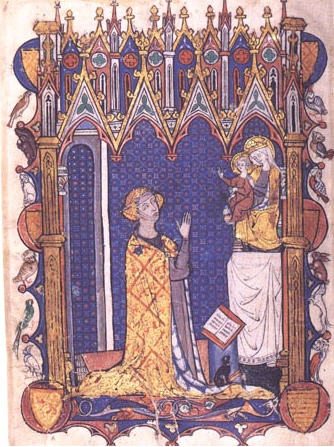
The original owner of the manuscript at her prayers, as illustrated in the manuscript

The Psalter–Hours of Yolande de Soissons is an illuminated manuscript produced in Amiens between about 1290 and 1297. It is currently kept at the Morgan Library in New York, accession number MS M.729.

== Physical attributes ==
The Psalter–Hours contains 437 numbered folios of high quality parchment measuring 137 by 179 millimetres (5.4 in × 7.0 in). The text consists of nineteen lines per page in a space of 78 by 107 millimetres (3.1 in × 4.2 in). The script is Gothic textualis.

There are 39 full-page illustrations and 64 historiated initials, as well as many smaller miniatures and decorated initials. Many pages have full or partial decorative borders. Where borders incorporate miniatures or historiated initials they are invariably accompanied by roundels bearing coats of arms. There are around 400 such roundels in the manuscript, bearing six different coats of arms, four of which can be identified with those of the counts of Grandpré, Hangest, Moreuil and Soissons.

The manuscript was rebound in leather by Marguerite Duprez Lahey in 1927.

== Texts ==
The Psalter–Hours starts with a calendar and a prayer. A psalter follows, occupying 164 folios (16r–179r), then ten canticles, a litany, twelve prayers, a lesson from the Gospel of John, two more prayers and two miscellaneous Marian texts (one on the Fifteen Joys of the Virgin). Three sets of canonical hours follow, occupying 123 folios (223r–345v). The Hours of the Holy Spirit and the Hours of the Virgin presented in parallel, followed by the Hours of the Cross. Two memorials for Saints Christopher and Claudius are included among the hours. The manuscript ends with the seven penitential psalms, the Office of the Dead, the Psalter of Saint Jerome and an office for Saint Michael.

== Provenance ==
As its conventional name implies, the manuscript was long thought to have been created for Yolande de Soissons, who was related to all of the families whose coats of arms are found in the decoration. The original owner is represented at prayer in a full-page illustration wearing a cloak covered in one of the coats of arms. Karen Gould speculated that the arms were Yolande's. More recently Alison Stones argues that the coat of arms belonged to Comtesse de la Table, lady of Cœuvres. She was Yolande de Soissons's mother or stepmother.

== Bibliography ==
- Gould, Karen K. (1978). The Psalter and Hours of Yolande of Soissons. Mediaeval Academy of America.
- Hourihane, Colum P., ed. (2012). "Psalter–Hours of Yolande de Soissons". The Grove Encyclopedia of Medieval Art and Architecture. Vol. 5. Oxford University Press. pp. 129–130.
- Koslin, Désirée (2018). "Visual Representations". In Sarah-Grace Heller (ed.). A Cultural History of Dress and Fashion in the Medieval Age. Bloomsbury. pp. 141–158.
- Sand, Alexa (1999). Picturing Devotion Anew in the Psalter-Hours of Yolande of Soissons (New York, Pierpont Morgan Library, M729) (PhD dissertation). University of California, Berkeley . ProQuest 9966556
- Sand, Alexa (2005). "Vision, Devotion, and Difficulty in the Psalter Hours 'of Yolande of Soissons'". The Art Bulletin. 87 (1): 6–23. JSTOR 25067153.
- Sand, Alexa (2014). Vision, Devotion, and Self-Representation in Late Medieval Art. Cambridge University Press.
- Stones, Alison (2004). "The Full-Page Miniatures of the Psalter-Hours New York, PML, ms M. 729, Programme and Patron". In F. O. Büttner (ed.). The Illuminated Psalter: Studies in the Content, Purpose and Placement of its Images. Brepols. pp. 281–307.
