= Maria of Brabant, Holy Roman Empress =

Holy Roman Empress from 1214 to 1215

Maria of Brabant
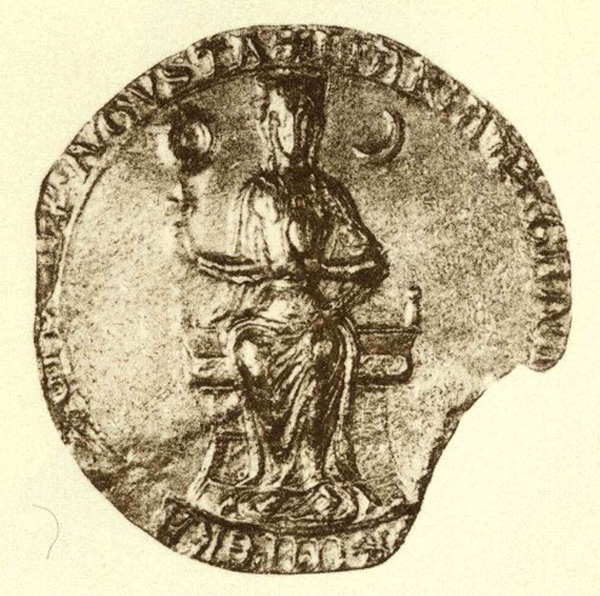
- Seal of Marie of Brabant.

Holy Roman Empress
- Tenure: 19 May 1214 – 5 July 1215
- Born: c. 1190
- Died: May/June 1260 (aged 69–70)
- Burial: St. Peter's Church, Leuven
- Spouses: Otto IV, Holy Roman Emperor (m. 1214) William I, Count of Holland
- House: Reginar
- Father: Henry I, Duke of Brabant
- Mother: Maud of Boulogne

Maria of Brabant (c. 1190 – May/June 1260), a member of the House of Reginar, was Holy Roman Empress from 1214 until 1215 as the second and last wife of the Welf emperor Otto IV.

== Family ==
Maria was the eldest daughter of Duke Henry I of Brabant and Maud of Boulogne.

== First marriage ==
Maria was betrothed to King Otto IV already in 1198, when she was only about eight years old. This happened while he was fighting for the German throne against his rival Philip of Swabia. Maria's father, Duke Henry I, had initially supported the claims of the Welf dynasty, but he later adopted an ambivalent position. In 1204, he came out in favour of the Hohenstaufen side, and the planned marriage seemed to have been cancelled.

Matters changed again in 1208, when Philip of Swabia was assassinated and Otto IV became undisputed King of the Romans. Otto was crowned Holy Roman Emperor by Pope Innocent III in 1209. Duke Henry of Brabant now hastened to reconcile with the Welf ruler, renewing the prospect of his daughter marrying Otto, but once again, this did not happen. Soon after his coronation, Otto IV steered into conflict with the Pope over the Kingdom of Sicily, then ruled by the young Hohenstaufen prince Frederick II, nephew of the late Philip of Swabia. Otto was excommunicated by his former ally, Pope Innocent. In September 1211, Otto was faced with the election of his new rival, Frederick, as anti-king. One year after this, Otto demonstratively married Beatrice of Swabia, daughter of his original rival the late King Philip, and paternal first cousin of Frederick.

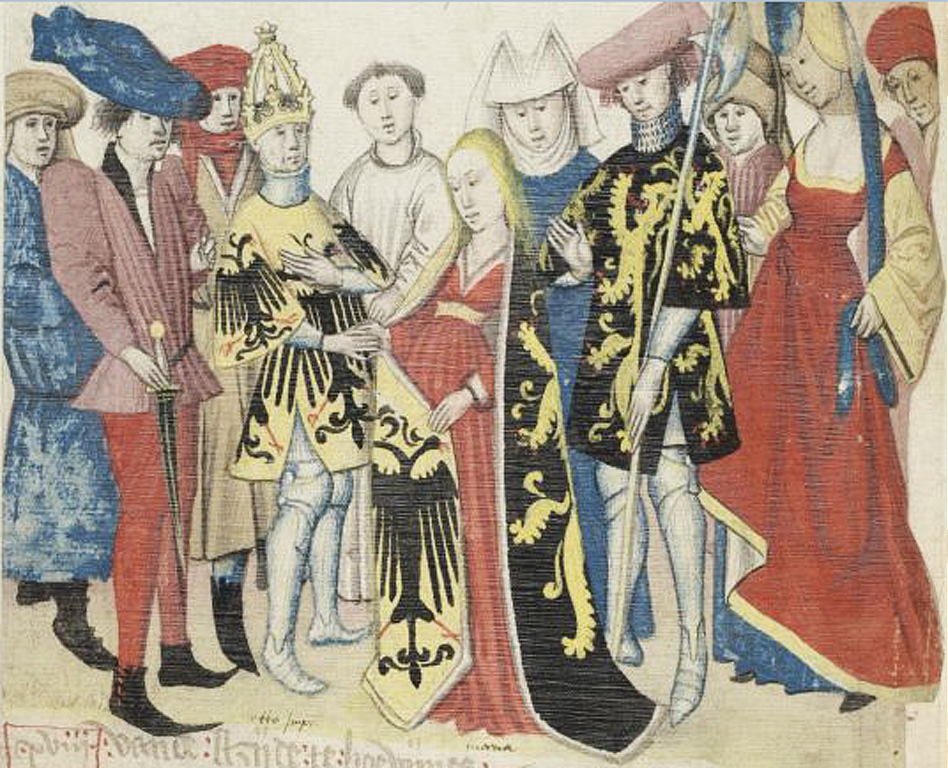
Marriage of Maria and Otto IV, from a 15th-century manuscript of the Brabantsche Yeesten by Jan van Boendale.

Yet another quirk of fate intervened: Beatrice of Swabia died less than three weeks after her wedding, on the 19th day, to be exact. Several Hohenstaufen loyalists had recently come over to support Otto IV against Frederick Hohenstaufen because of his marriage with Beatrice. Within a short period after her death, many of them transferred their allegiance back to Frederick II. Crowned king by Archbishop Siegfried II of Mainz in December 1212, Frederick's rise continued unabated and Otto was under increasing pressure. The previous engagement with Maria of Brabant once again became politically significant. Otto and Maria of Brabant got married on 19 May 1214 in Maastricht. She was about twenty-four years old by this time, and her husband approximately thirty-nine.

In view of the ongoing conflict between Welfs and Hohenstaufens, Maria was Empress of a divided Holy Roman Empire. Her husband's rule came to an end, when Frederick forged an alliance with King Philip II of France and provoked Otto to enter into the Anglo-French War. On 27 July 1214, the Imperial army was decisively defeated in the Battle of Bouvines and forced to retreat. King Philip II sent the captured Imperial Reichsadler standard to Frederick. With his forces decimated and having lost supporters to both death and defection, Otto was forced to withdraw to his Welf estates around Brunswick in Saxony with his wife.

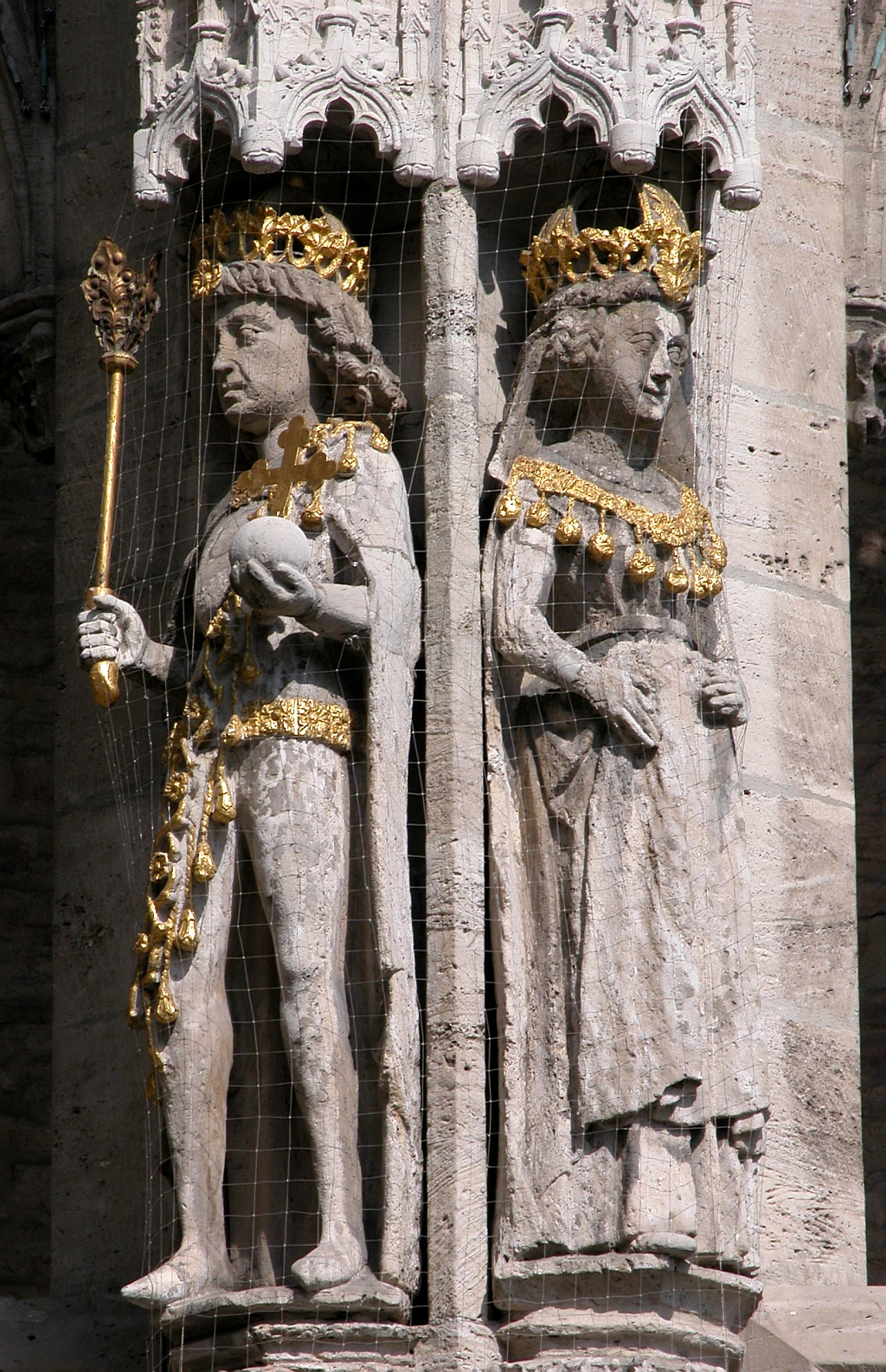
Otto IV and Maria of Brabant

Otto was effectively deposed on 5 July 1215 and Frederick again crowned King of Germany on 25 July, unopposed this time. Pope Innocent III, who had previously crowned Otto, acknowledged Frederick's rule as emperor-to-be during the Fourth Council of the Lateran in November. Maria joined her husband in his retirement. Resigned and seriously ill, Otto died at Harzburg castle on 19 May 1218. There were no children from their marriage.

== Second marriage ==
Maria remained a widow for about two years. In July 1220, she married her second husband Count William I of Holland. Nevertheless, William died just two years later, on 4 February 1222. He was survived by at least five children. Genealogists believe all five were born by his first wife Adelaide of Guelders. However, there is some uncertainty on their dates of birth.

Maria survived her second husband by 38 years, but never remarried. In her later years, she again adopted the title of empress, establishing a Cistercian monastery at Binderen, Brabant (today part of Helmond). She is buried in St. Peter's Church, Leuven.

== See also ==
- Marie of Brabant (disambiguation)

== Sources ==
- Nicholson, Helen J. (2001). Love, war, and the Grail. Brill.
- Wilkinson, Louise J. (2012). Eleanor de Montfort: A Rebel Countess in Medieval England. Bloomsbury Publishing.

Maria of Brabant, Holy Roman Empress House of Reginar
Royal titles
Preceded by Beatrice of Swabia	Holy Roman Empress; 19 May 1214 – 5 July 1215	Succeeded by Constance of Aragon
