= Arnold III of Loon =

Count of Loon and Rieneck

Arnold III (died 1221), Count of Looz and Count of Rieneck, son of Gérard II, Count of Looz, and Adelaide of Gelderland, daughter of Henry I, Count of Guelders, and Agnes of Arnstein, daughter of Louis III of Arnstein.

From 1207 to 1214, he was held hostage in England in order to guarantee the obligations of his brother Louis II and his wife Ada of Holland to give up the county of Holland.

In 1206, Arnold married Adelaide, daughter of Henry I, Duke of Brabant, and Mathilde of Boulogne. Arnold and Adelaide had one daughter, Jeanne, Fléron of Loon.

Upon his death, Arnold was succeeded by Louis III, the son of his brother Gérard III. His widow remarried William X of Clermont (1195-1247), Count of Auvergne.
