= Bible de Souvigny =

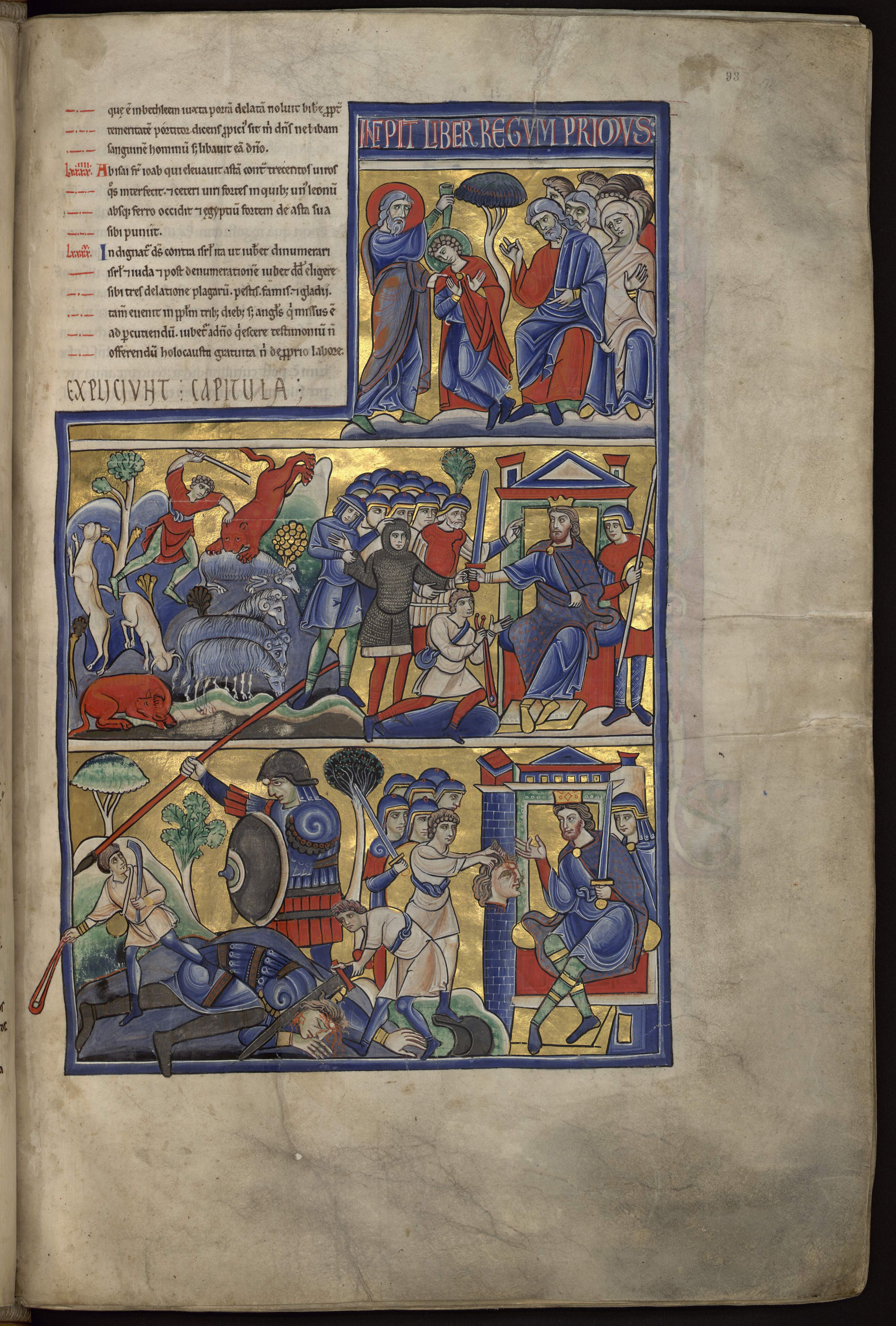

The Bible of Souvigny was written at the end of the 12th century in France. It is filled with five large miniatures and fifty-three historiated initials of manuscript illuminations and was produced at the Cluny Abbey. It is a chief of work of art from the French Middle Ages and is preserved at the bibliothèque de Moulins. The Bible of Souvigny was saved from confiscation during the French Revolution.

There is a facsimile of the Bible of Souvigny in the city of the same name in Auvergne.
