= Walter Cahn =

American art historian

Walter Benedict Cahn (24 September 1933 – 29 May 2020) was a German-born American medievalist and art historian who taught at Yale University as Carnegie Professor of the History of Art.

Cahn was born in Karlsruhe on 24 September 1933 to Otto and Frieda Cahn. His Jewish family was deported to what would become Vichy France in 1938, and after surviving World War II there, he reached the United States in 1948.

Walter Cahn was educated at the Pratt Institute from 1952 to 1956. He served from 1956 to 1958 in the United States Army Medical Corps, at Walter Reed Hospital in Washington, DC. In 1958, he enrolled at the Institute of Fine Arts of New York University, completing his Ph.D. in 1967 with a dissertation on the "Souvigny Bible—A Study in Romanesque Manuscript Illumination." His Romanesque Wooden Doors of Auvergne was published in 1974.

He began teaching at Yale in 1965, where he spent the rest of his career. He was awarded a Guggenheim Fellowship in 1981, and has served as a councillor of the Medieval Academy of America. Cahn was elected a fellow of the Medieval Academy of America in 1989. An exhibition at Yale's Beinecke Library was held in 2003 to in Cahn's honor. In 2014, Cahn was elected a fellow of the American Academy of Arts and Sciences.

In 2008 Romanesque Art and Thought in the Twelfth Century : Essays in Honor of Walter Cahn. was published in his honor.

== Selected publications ==
- Cahn, Walter, and James Marrow. 1978. Medieval and Renaissance Manuscripts at Yale : A Selection. [New Haven, Conn.]: [Yale University Library].
- Cahn, Walter. 1979. Masterpieces : Chapters on the History of an Idea. Princeton, N.J.: Princeton University Press.
- Cahn, Walter, and Linda Seidel. 1979. Romanesque Sculpture in American Collections. New York, Turnhout, Belgium: B. Franklin; Brepols.
- Cahn, Walter. 1982. Romanesque Bible Illumination. Ithaca, N.Y.: Cornell University Press.
- Cahn, Walter, Ilene H. Forsyth, William W. Clark, and International Center of Medieval Art. 1988. Current Studies on Cluny. [New York, N.Y.]: [International Center of Medieval Art].
- Cahn, Walter. 1996. Romanesque Manuscripts : The Twelfth Century. London: Harvey Miller.
- Cahn, Walter. 2000. Studies in Medieval Art and Interpretation. London: Pindar Press.
- Cahn, Walter, and Patricia Stirnemann. 2007. La Bible de Souvigny. Souvigny: Ville de Souvigny.
