= Baffie =

- Commune
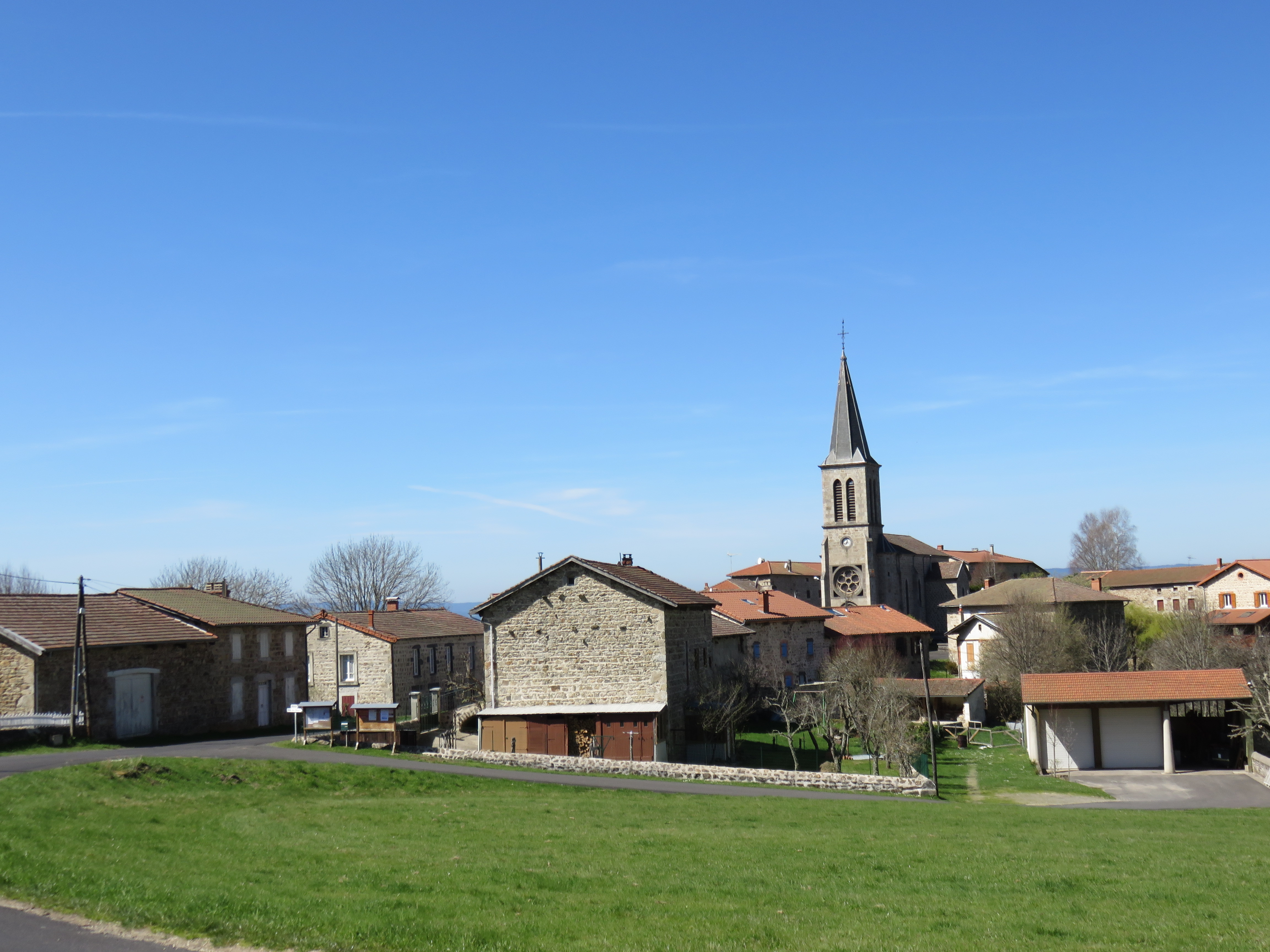
- A general view of Baffie
- Location of Baffie
- Location within France Location within Auvergne-Rhône-Alpes
- Coordinates: 45°28′22″N 3°49′41″E
- Country: France
- Region: Auvergne-Rhône-Alpes
- Department: Puy-de-Dôme
- Arrondissement: Ambert
- Canton: Ambert
- Intercommunality: Ambert Livradois Forez

Government
  - Mayor (2020–2026): Christian Guénolé
- Area^{1}: 10.62 km^{2} (4.10 sq mi)
- Elevation: 850 m (2,790 ft)
- Highest elevation: 1,229 m (4,032 ft)
- Lowest elevation: 749 m (2,457 ft)
- Population (2023): 111
  - Density: 10.5/km^{2} (27.1/sq mi)
- Time zone: UTC+01:00 (CET)
  - Summer (DST): UTC+02:00 (CEST)
- INSEE/Postal code: 63027 /63600
- ^{1} French Land Register data, which excludes lakes, ponds, glaciers > 1 km^{2} (0.386 sq mi or 247 acres) and river estuaries.

Baffie (French pronunciation: [bafi]; Auvergnat: Bèfia) is a commune in the Puy-de-Dôme department in Auvergne-Rhône-Alpes in central France.

== Population ==
Historical population
Year	Pop.	±% p.a.
1968	184	—
1975	146	−3.25%
1982	130	−1.64%
1990	108	−2.29%
1999	101	−0.74%
2007	115	+1.64%
2012	116	+0.17%
2017	112	−0.70%
2023	111	−0.15%
Source: INSEE

== See also ==
- Communes of the Puy-de-Dôme department
- House of Baffie
