= William XI of Auvergne =

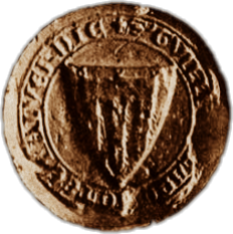
Seal of William XI

William XI or William XII was the Count of Auvergne and Boulogne from 1277 until his death no later than 1279.

William was the eldest son of Count Robert V, as attested in the latter's will. He is first mentioned with the title count in an arrêt of the Parlement of Paris in 1276. There is only one unreliable modern copy of a charter from Boulogne dated 1277 that directly attests William's brief rule of Auvergne. He was dead by 1279 and was succeeded by his brother, Robert VI. He was buried in the abbey of Bouschet.

William married a daughter of Humbert V of Beaujeu, constable of France, although she is unnamed in the sources.

French nobility
Preceded by Robert I and V	Count of Auvergne and Boulogne; 1277–1277	Succeeded by Robert II and VI
