= Robert VI of Auvergne =

Robert VI
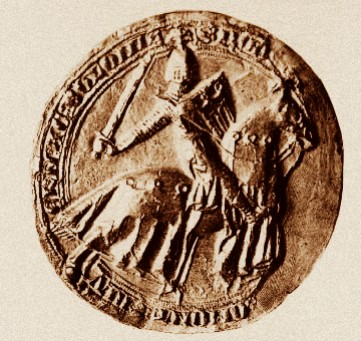
- Seal of Robert VI

Count of Auvergne and Boulogne
- Reign: 1277–1317
- Predecessor: William XI of Auvergne
- Successor: Robert VII of Auvergne
- Born: c. 1250
- Died: 1317
- Buried: Church of Bouschet-Vauluisant, Yronde-et-Buron
- Noble family: House of Auvergne
- Spouse: Beatrice of Montgascon
- Issue: Robert
- Father: Robert V of Auvergne
- Mother: Éléonore of Baffie

Robert VI of Auvergne (c. 1250 – 1317) was count of Auvergne and Boulogne from 1277 until his death.

== Life ==
Robert was the second-born son of the count of Auverge and Boulogne Robert V and Eleonore of Baffie.

According to his father's will, Robert was to inherit the area of Combraille, while his older brother William XI of Auvergne would inherit the counties of Auvergne and Boulogne. However, William would die less than a year after his father's death, without leaving any heirs. So the countly titles passed to Robert.

In 1299, Robert and his wife, Beatrice, renounced their claims on the lordship of Beaujeu, Rhône, in exchange for a sum of money, to be paid before five years.

In 1297, Robert fought alongside the king of france, Philip IV, in the Franco-Flemish War. He participated in the battle inside of the walls of Courtrai on the 11th of July 1302. According to Étienne Baluze, Robert fled the battle together with other nobles, but other chroniclers disagree. Robert also took part in the following Battle of Mons-en-Pévèle, in 1304.

In 1308, Robert escorted Louis X of France on a mission in Pamplona, at that time part of the kingdom of Navarre.

In 1314, Robert became part of the regency council for Philip V, after the death of his brother, Louis X.

Robert probably died in 1317, after which he is not mentioned in any other document.

== Family and issue ==
In 1279, in Luzillat, Robert married Beatrice of Montgascon, lady of Montgascon and Pontgibaud, daughter of Faucon III of Montgascon and his wife Isabel of Ventadour. From her he had only one son: Robert VII, count of Auvergne and Boulogne.

French nobility
Preceded by William II and XI	Count of Auvergne and Boulogne; 1277–1317	Succeeded by Robert III and VII
