= Margaret Alison Stones =

British academic

M. Alison Stones
- Born: Margaret Alison Stones
- Title: Professor Emerita

Academic background
- Education: Courtauld Institute of Art, University of London

Academic work
- Discipline: History of Art
- Institutions: University of Pittsburgh

Margaret Alison Stones, FSA, (published as Alison Stones, M. Alison Stones, and Margaret Stones) is a British/American medievalist and academic. She has held the position of professor emerita of history of art and architecture at University of Pittsburgh since 2012. Her work has been published in national and international academic journals and she has contributed to international exhibitions.

== Early life and education ==
Stones received a joint honours BA in French and German in 1964 from the University of London. In 1966, she completed her postgraduate degree on the History of European Art at the Courtauld Institute of Art. Stones obtained her PhD at the Courtauld Institute and Birkbeck College, with a thesis 'The illustrations of the French prose 'Lancelot' 1250–1340'.

== Career ==
Stones taught art history at the University of Minnesota between 1969 and 1984. In 1983, she was accepted to teach at the University of Pittsburgh, where she specialized in medieval art history and illuminated manuscripts for 30 years.

== Fellowships and awards ==
In 1992, Stones was appointed a member of the International Committee of Experts on the Way of St. James, "to advise the Galician Department of Culture on scientific and cultural matters in preparation for the 1993 Compostela Holy Year". She was elected a member of the Society of Antiquaries of London in 1995.

In 2009, Stones was awarded the American Council of Learned Societies Digital Innovation Fellowship for a study on manuscripts of Arthurian romance using digital humanities techniques.

As a result of her particular focus on French art history, Stones was elected member of the Société nationale des antiquaires de France for contributions to the study of medieval manuscripts and architecture, one of only 10 non-French members. In 2015 she was awarded the Chevalier dans l’Ordre des Arts et des Lettres (Chevalier of the Order of Arts and Letters) recognising her contributions to French history of art scholarship. French Deputy Cultural Counselor Thomas Michelon praised Stones's leadership of a 2004 study on Chartres Cathedral of Notre Dame, and her work creating databases for details of the Church of Sainte-Marie-Madeleine at Vézelay in Burgundy.

== Personal life ==
Stones was born in England and is married to Roger Benjamin, a political scientist, researcher and education administrator. They have three children, Victoria Benjamin, Oliver Benjamin and Elizabeth Benjamin.

== Selected works ==
- 2017, 'Text and Image', in The Handbook of Arthurian Romance: King Arthur's Court in Medieval European Literature, ed. Leah Tether and Johnny McFayden, in collaboration with Keith Busby and Ad Putter (Berlin and Boston: De Gruyter), 215–33.
- 2014, Manuscripts Illuminated in France: Gothic Manuscripts 1260-1320, Part II, 2 vols. (Turnhout: Harvey Miller/Brepols).
- 2013, Gothic Manuscripts 1260-1320, Part I, vols. 1 and 2, A Survey of Manuscripts Illuminated in France (Turnhout and London: Harvey Miller/Brepols) ISBN 9781872501956. For The Medieval Review, Alexa Sand at Utah State University wrote "Stones' entries are rigorously attentive to the fundamentals of visual analysis, and her characterizations of color, brushwork, draftsmanship, and facture are precise and informative."
- Photographs by Stones are held in the Conway Library, an architecture photography collection of the Courtauld Institute of Art.
