= Miodet =

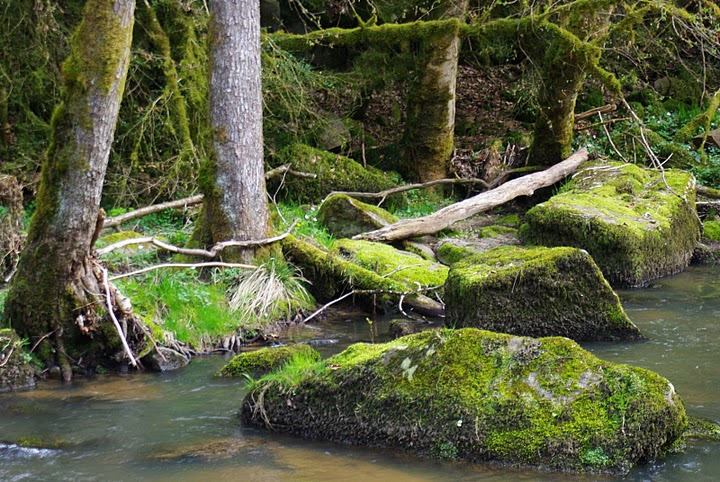
- Before the Sauviat dam

- Location within France Location within Auvergne-Rhône-Alpes

Physical characteristics
- Mouth: Dore
  - coordinates: 45.7147°N 3.5283°E
- Length: 30.4 km (18.9 mi)

Basin features
- Progression: Dore→ Allier→ Loire→ Atlantic Ocean

The Miodet is a 30.4-kilometre (18.9 mi) stream in the Auvergne region. It originates in the Livradois and joins the Dore (left bank), whereby it is a sub-affluent of the Loire.

== Geography ==
The Miodet originates at 1,000 metres (3,300 ft) above sea level, at Saint-Éloy-la-Glacière, near the Bois de Mauchet, elevation 1,095 metres (3,593 ft). It runs almost entirely through wooded areas. It first runs south, before turning north-west at le sommet du Grun du Bois, elevation 896 metres (2,940 ft). It is joined by le ruisseau des Martinanches at Saint-Dier-d'Auvergne, then veers north-east. It runs north shortly before its confluence with the Dore on the left bank.

It is located in the Livradois-Forez Regional Natural Park.

== Affluents ==
The Miodet has 3 recorded tributaries:

- le Croizat
- les Martinanches
- les Palles

== Communes ==
The course of the steam runs by or through :

- Saint-Éloy-la-Glacière
- Auzelles
- Brousse
- Saint-Jean-des-Ollières
- Estandeuil
- Saint-Dier-d'Auvergne
- Domaize
- Saint-Flour
