= Adrien Pommier =

French Resistance fighter

- Born: 14 September 1919; Saint-Dier-d'Auvergne, France
- Died: 22 October 1972 (aged 53); Nice, France
- Occupation: Radio Engineer
- Spouses: Suzanne Huguet; Odette Bouzeran
- Children: Martine Pommier; Bernard Pommier; Michel Pommier

Adrien Pommier (14 September 1919 – 22 November 1973) was a member of the French Resistance during World War II.

== Life prior to the Resistance ==
Adrien Pommier was born on 14 September 1919 in Saint-Dier-d'Auvergne, a small village in the center of France, to Helene Huc the daughter of a local doctor and Simeon Pommier a World War I veteran. As a child he grew up in Billom, France. Following in the footsteps of his father and grandfather, Adrien became a horseman, a Republican, and studied to become a radio engineer.

== The Youngest Captain ==
In 1939 Pommier volunteered to be enlisted but was refused as he did not yet have the required age. Leaving the recruiting center he met a member of the secret army of Billom, and after being recruited served as an intelligence liaison until he joined the Resistance's Maquis and was wanted by the Gestapo.

== The secret army ==
During 1940 at the age of 21 Adrien Pommier was enlisted in and joined the 28th regiment as a transmission operator. In parallel he had already been serving in the secret army one year prior and he continued to work on counter intelligence missions in Clermont Ferrand and the surrounding regions with Henry Ingrand (alias Mazieres) and Pierre Dejussieu-Pontcarral (alias Felicien, Chief of the secret army region R6).

== The resistance maquis ==
From 1941 to 1942 Adrien Pommier was known by the alias Arthur chief of the secret army 7th sub-district to then later become Captain Hoche in command of the 4th company F.F.I. (4th corps franc of Auvergne region) of the region Maquis du Mont Mouchet headed by Colonel Emile Coulaudon alias Gaspard. From 1942 to 1944 the 4th company, headed by its young commandant, participated in many guerrilla and sabotage attacks on the German occupants and French authorities collaborating with the enemy stealing gas, guns, ammunition, food, etc.

== Captain Hoche's 4th Company ==
During the period of June–July 1944 and in the center of France in the Mont-Mouchet forest at the confines of Cantal, Haute Loire and Lozere was the theater of a battle between the German army and the French Resistance. Captain Hoche's (alias of Adrien Pommier) 4th Company and other FFI companies were posted between Saint-Flour and Clavières during the Battle of Mont Mouchet. Outgunned and with almost no ammunition they engaged the German motorized columns from the Jesser Divisions between Claviere, Pinols and Saugues. The sacrifices of these Maquisards, with the heavy losses of 260 deaths and 180 injured, blocked 2 German divisions that were heading to the Normandy front.

== His Role in the Liberation ==
At the end of June and in early July, the F.F.I. Companies were regrouped, equipped and kept up the fight until the country was completely liberated. The 4th company, like most of the other F.F.I. units, joined the 1st army commanded by General Jean de Lattre de Tassigny. Adrien Pommier then assumed command of the 1st, 3rd, 4th and 5th companies that then became the 2nd Battalion (the Rapid Column 3) which participated to the liberation of Thiers, Puy de Dôme, and later Lyon (the second largest French city at the time).

== Medals / Recognitions ==
- Chevalier de la Légion d'honneur
- Croix de guerre 1939–1945 with star
- Resistance Medal
- Combatant cross
- Volunteer combatant cross
- Volunteer resistance combatant cross

== See also ==
- Billom
- Clermont Ferrand
- Croix de guerre 1939-1945
- Émile Coulaudon
- French Resistance
- Jean de Lattre de Tassigny
- Ordre national de la Légion d'honneur
- Saint Dier d'Auvergne
