= Guillaume Duprat =

French bishop

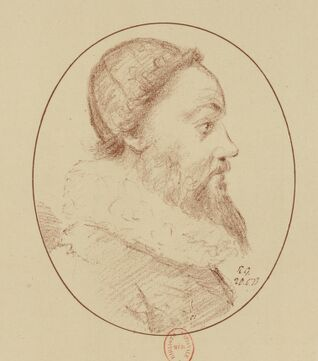
- Born: 1507
- Died: 22 October 1560 (aged 52–53); Beauregard-l'Évêque
- Occupation: Bishops in the Catholic Church
- Parent(s): Antoine Duprat
- Position held: Roman Catholic Bishop of Clermont (1528–)

Guillaume Duprat (1507–1560) was a French bishop. He founded the Collège de Clermont in Paris.

Duprat family coat-of-arms.

He was born at Issoire, son of the chancellor and Cardinal Antoine Duprat. He was appointed Bishop of Clermont in 1529; later he took part in the last sessions of the Council of Trent. He was a patron of the Jesuits. Not only did he receive them in his diocese, where they were put in charge of the colleges of Billom and Mauriac, but, in the face of opposition, he helped them financially and in other ways, in particular by founding the Collège de Clermont, so called after his episcopal city. He died at Beauregard.
