= Arrondissement of Clermont-Ferrand =

Coordinates: 45°46′N 3°05′E

Clermont-Ferrand
- Arrondissement
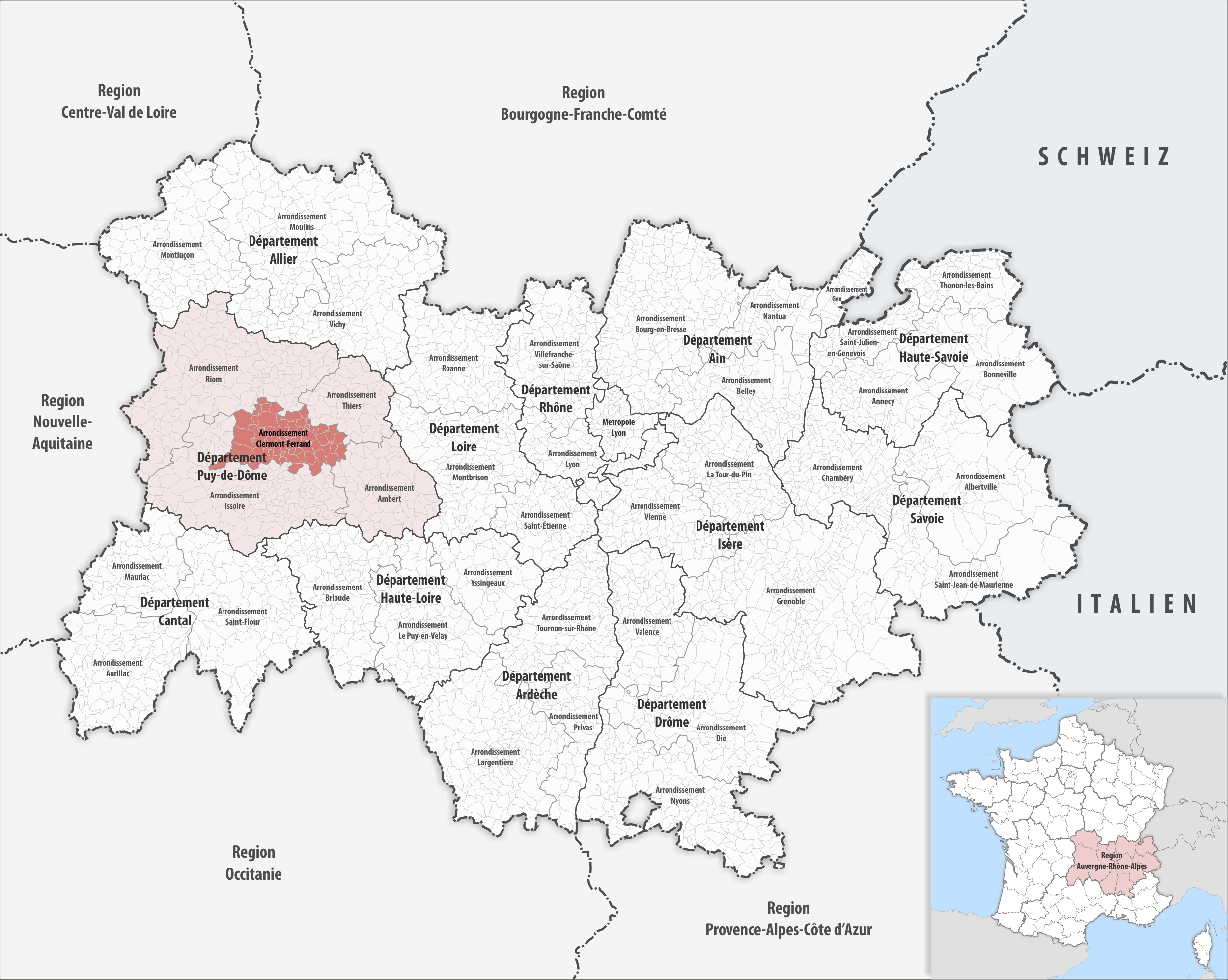
- Location within the region Auvergne-Rhône-Alpes
- Country: France
- Region: Auvergne-Rhône-Alpes
- Department: Puy-de-Dôme
- No. of communes: {{{nbcomm}}}
- Area: 884.4 km^{2} (341.5 sq mi)
- Population (2023): 363,101
  - Density: 410.6/km^{2} (1,063/sq mi)
- INSEE code: 632

The arrondissement of Clermont-Ferrand is an arrondissement of France in the Puy-de-Dôme department in the Auvergne-Rhône-Alpes region. It has 73 communes. Its population is 362,578 (2021), and its area is 884.4 km^{2} (341.5 sq mi).

== Composition ==
The communes of the arrondissement of Clermont-Ferrand, and their INSEE codes, are:

1. Aubière (63014)
2. Aulnat (63019)
3. Authezat (63021)
4. Aydat (63026)
5. Beaumont (63032)
6. Beauregard-l'Évêque (63034)
7. Billom (63040)
8. Blanzat (63042)
9. Bongheat (63044)
10. Bouzel (63049)
11. Busséol (63059)
12. Cébazat (63063)
13. Le Cendre (63069)
14. Ceyrat (63070)
15. Chamalières (63075)
16. Chanonat (63084)
17. Chas (63096)
18. Châteaugay (63099)
19. Chauriat (63106)
20. Clermont-Ferrand (63113)
21. Corent (63120)
22. Cournols (63123)
23. Cournon-d'Auvergne (63124)
24. Le Crest (63126)
25. Durtol (63141)
26. Égliseneuve-près-Billom (63146)
27. Espirat (63154)
28. Estandeuil (63155)
29. Fayet-le-Château (63157)
30. Gerzat (63164)
31. Glaine-Montaigut (63168)
32. Isserteaux (63177)
33. Laps (63188)
34. Lempdes (63193)
35. Manglieu (63205)
36. Les Martres-de-Veyre (63214)
37. Mauzun (63216)
38. Mirefleurs (63227)
39. Montmorin (63239)
40. Mur-sur-Allier (63226)
41. Neuville (63252)
42. Nohanent (63254)
43. Olloix (63259)
44. Orcet (63262)
45. Orcines (63263)
46. Pérignat-lès-Sarliève (63272)
47. Pérignat-sur-Allier (63273)
48. Pignols (63280)
49. Pont-du-Château (63284)
50. Reignat (63297)
51. La Roche-Blanche (63302)
52. La Roche-Noire (63306)
53. Romagnat (63307)
54. Royat (63308)
55. Saint-Amant-Tallende (63315)
56. Saint-Bonnet-lès-Allier (63325)
57. Saint-Dier-d'Auvergne (63334)
58. Saint-Genès-Champanelle (63345)
59. Saint-Georges-sur-Allier (63350)
60. Saint-Jean-des-Ollières (63365)
61. Saint-Julien-de-Coppel (63368)
62. Saint-Maurice (63378)
63. Saint-Sandoux (63395)
64. Saint-Saturnin (63396)
65. Sallèdes (63405)
66. La Sauvetat (63413)
67. Tallende (63425)
68. Trézioux (63438)
69. Vassel (63445)
70. Vertaizon (63453)
71. Veyre-Monton (63455)
72. Vic-le-Comte (63457)
73. Yronde-et-Buron (63472)

== History ==
The arrondissement of Clermont-Ferrand was created in 1800. At the January 2017 reorganisation of the arrondissements of Puy-de-Dôme, it gained one commune from the arrondissement of Riom, and it lost three communes to the arrondissement of Ambert, 21 communes to the arrondissement of Issoire, 17 communes to the arrondissement of Riom and four communes to the arrondissement of Thiers. In January 2021 it lost the commune of Saulzet-le-Froid to the arrondissement of Issoire.

As a result of the reorganisation of the cantons of France which came into effect in 2015, the borders of the cantons are no longer related to the borders of the arrondissements. The cantons of the arrondissement of Clermont-Ferrand were, as of January 2015:

1. Aubière
2. Beaumont
3. Billom
4. Bourg-Lastic
5. Chamalières
6. Clermont-Ferrand-Centre
7. Clermont-Ferrand-Est
8. Clermont-Ferrand-Nord
9. Clermont-Ferrand-Nord-Ouest
10. Clermont-Ferrand-Ouest
11. Clermont-Ferrand-Sud
12. Clermont-Ferrand-Sud-Est
13. Clermont-Ferrand-Sud-Ouest
14. Cournon-d'Auvergne
15. Gerzat
16. Herment
17. Montferrand
18. Pont-du-Château
19. Rochefort-Montagne
20. Royat
21. Saint-Amant-Tallende
22. Saint-Dier-d'Auvergne
23. Vertaizon
24. Veyre-Monton
25. Vic-le-Comte
