= Pérignat-sur-Allier =

- Commune
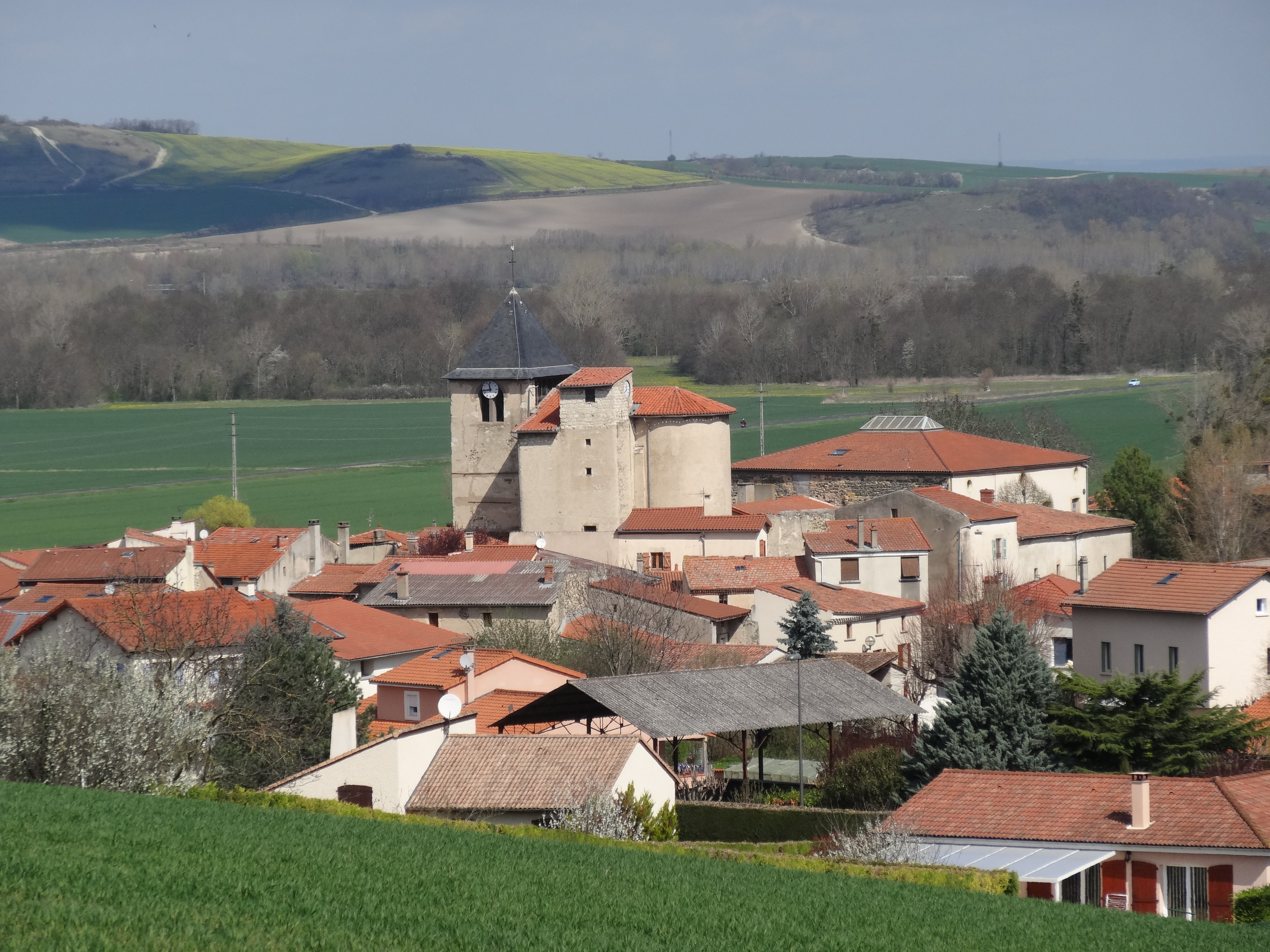
- A general view of Pérignat-sur-Allier

- Coat of arms
- Location of Pérignat-sur-Allier
- Location within France Location within Auvergne-Rhône-Alpes
- Coordinates: 45°43′44″N 3°13′55″E
- Country: France
- Region: Auvergne-Rhône-Alpes
- Department: Puy-de-Dôme
- Arrondissement: Clermont-Ferrand
- Canton: Vic-le-Comte
- Intercommunality: Billom Communauté

Government
  - Mayor (2020–2026): Jean-Pierre Buche
- Area^{1}: 4.90 km^{2} (1.89 sq mi)
- Elevation: 340 m (1,120 ft)
- Highest elevation: 389 m (1,276 ft)
- Lowest elevation: 312 m (1,024 ft)
- Population (2023): 1,506
  - Density: 307/km^{2} (796/sq mi)
- Time zone: UTC+01:00 (CET)
  - Summer (DST): UTC+02:00 (CEST)
- INSEE/Postal code: 63273 /63800
- ^{1} French Land Register data, which excludes lakes, ponds, glaciers > 1 km^{2} (0.386 sq mi or 247 acres) and river estuaries.

Pérignat-sur-Allier (French pronunciation: [peʁiɲa syʁ alje], literally Pérignat on Allier; Occitan: Pairinhat) is a commune in the Puy-de-Dôme department in Auvergne in central France. Pérignat-sur-Allier is part of the metropolitan area of Clermont-Ferrand and belongs to the community of communes of Billom Communauté. Its inhabitants are called Pérignatois in French.

== History ==
The first name of Pérignat was "Patrinoacum." An early hamlet evolved around the villa of a certain Patrinius, an important landholder. Under the Romans a villa was the center of an estate dedicated to agricultural production, often extending hundreds of hectares. At Pérignat there are still found remains of a Roman road and a necropolis with a sarcophagus and ceramic dated to the second century.

In the Middle Ages the village had become a fief of the family of the lords of Cournon-d'Auvergne by the eleventh century. The village's name evolved to "Payrinhac," as attested in an Occitan manuscript from 1240. By the fifteenth century, the village's name was extended to "Pérignat oultre l'Allier" ("Pérignat on the other side of the Allier") and had become a possession of the lords of Montmorin. The village still has vestiges of the medieval fortified town.

By the end of the Ancien Régime the name had become "Grand Pérignat," and later in the nineteenth century, "Pérignat-ès-Allier. There is controversy around the current name, Pérignat-sur-Allier," which resulted from a mistake in the registration of the name of the village at the end of the nineteenth century. In the town hall register one also finds the variant "Pérignat-s-Allier."

== Monuments ==
The village's fortified Church of Saint Agatha, which dates from the twelfth century, has been listed in the supplementary inventory of historic monuments since 1968. The church was remodeled in the 16th and 17th century and has a bell dated 1678.

== See also ==
- Communes of the Puy-de-Dôme department
