= Égliseneuve =

Égliseneuve may refer to:

- Égliseneuve-d'Entraigues, a commune in the Puy-de-Dôme department in Auvergne in central France.
- Égliseneuve-des-Liards, a commune in the Puy-de-Dôme department in Auvergne in central France.
- Égliseneuve-près-Billom, a commune in the Puy-de-Dôme department in Auvergne in central France.
