= Saint-Bonnet-lès-Allier =

- Commune
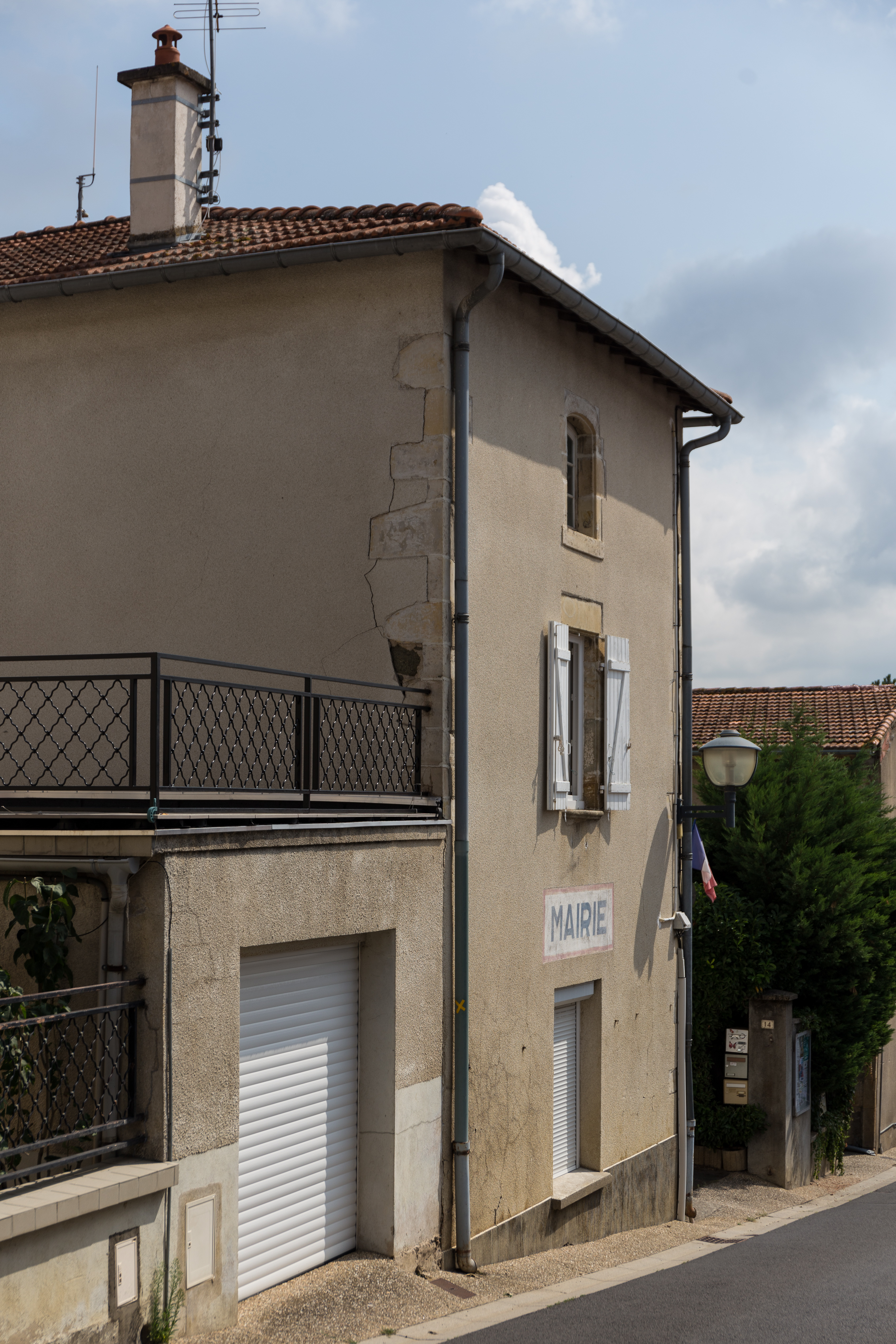
- Town hall

- Coat of arms
- Location of Saint-Bonnet-lès-Allier
- Location within France Location within Auvergne-Rhône-Alpes
- Coordinates: 45°44′31″N 3°15′14″E
- Country: France
- Region: Auvergne-Rhône-Alpes
- Department: Puy-de-Dôme
- Arrondissement: Clermont-Ferrand
- Canton: Billom

Government
  - Mayor (2026–32): Emeric Décombe
- Area^{1}: 1.51 km^{2} (0.58 sq mi)
- Elevation: 420 m (1,380 ft)
- Highest elevation: 437 m (1,434 ft)
- Lowest elevation: 346 m (1,135 ft)
- Population (2023): 409
  - Density: 271/km^{2} (702/sq mi)
- Time zone: UTC+01:00 (CET)
  - Summer (DST): UTC+02:00 (CEST)
- INSEE/Postal code: 63325 /63800
- ^{1} French Land Register data, which excludes lakes, ponds, glaciers > 1 km^{2} (0.386 sq mi or 247 acres) and river estuaries.

Saint-Bonnet-lès-Allier (French pronunciation: [sɛ̃ bɔnɛ lɛ.z‿alje], literally Saint-Bonnet near Allier; Auvergnat: Sent Bonet d'Alèir) is a commune in the Puy-de-Dôme department in Auvergne-Rhône-Alpes in central France.

== See also ==
- Communes of the Puy-de-Dôme department
