= Espirat =

- Commune
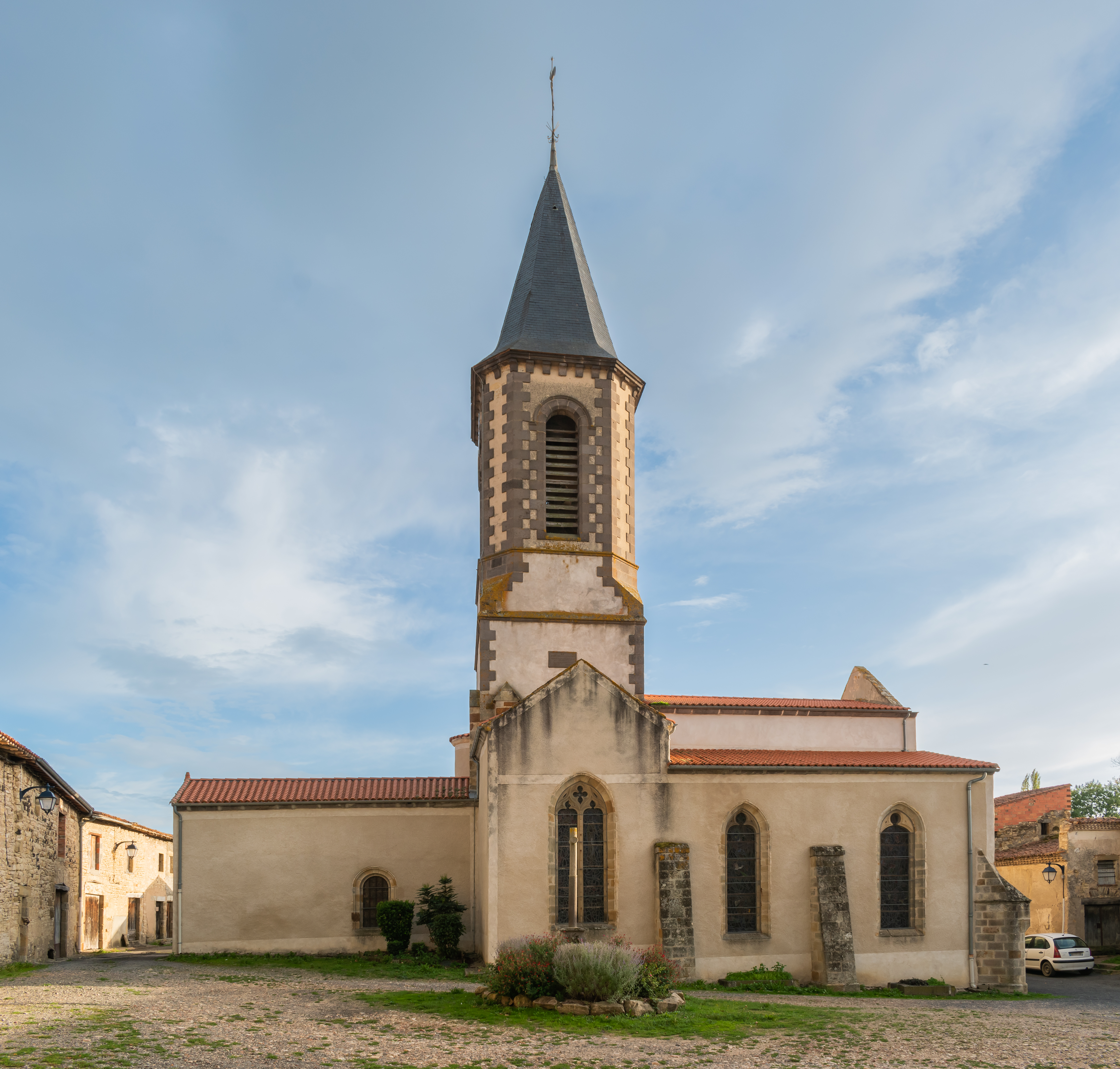
- The church in Espirat
- Location of Espirat
- Location within France Location within Auvergne-Rhône-Alpes
- Coordinates: 45°45′04″N 3°20′12″E
- Country: France
- Region: Auvergne-Rhône-Alpes
- Department: Puy-de-Dôme
- Arrondissement: Clermont-Ferrand
- Canton: Billom
- Intercommunality: Billom Communauté

Government
  - Mayor (2020–2026): Bruno Duarte
- Area^{1}: 4.32 km^{2} (1.67 sq mi)
- Elevation: 342 m (1,122 ft)
- Highest elevation: 363 m (1,191 ft)
- Lowest elevation: 327 m (1,073 ft)
- Population (2023): 416
  - Density: 96.3/km^{2} (249/sq mi)
- Time zone: UTC+01:00 (CET)
  - Summer (DST): UTC+02:00 (CEST)
- INSEE/Postal code: 63154 /63160
- ^{1} French Land Register data, which excludes lakes, ponds, glaciers > 1 km^{2} (0.386 sq mi or 247 acres) and river estuaries.

Espirat (French pronunciation: [ɛspiʁa]) is a commune in the Puy-de-Dôme department in Auvergne-Rhône-Alpes in central France.

Its inhabitants are called Piradaires.

== See also ==
- Communes of the Puy-de-Dôme department
