= Fayet-le-Château =

Fayet-le-Château Faiet lo Chastèl (Occitan)
- Commune
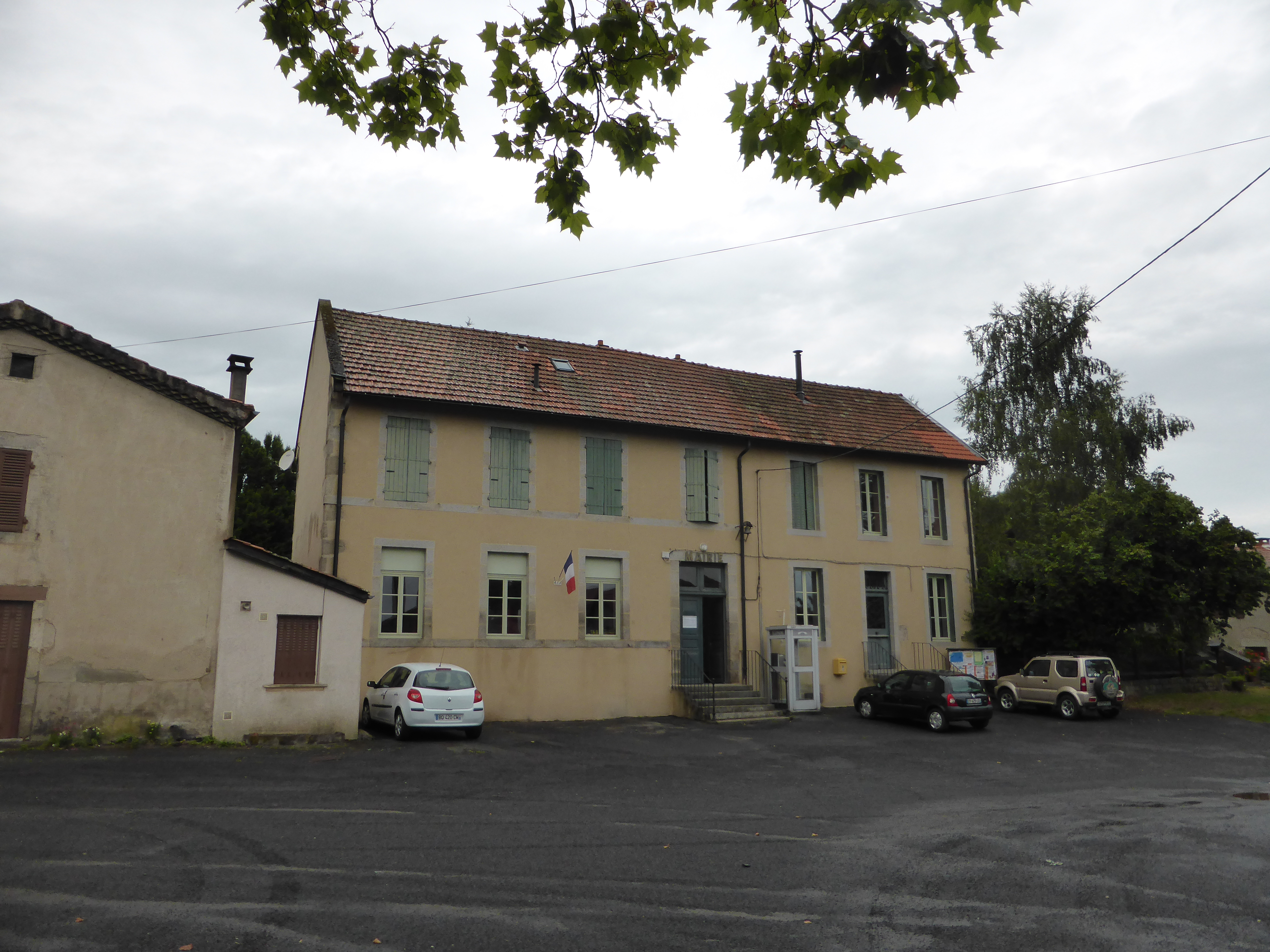
- The town hall in Fayet-le-Château

- Coat of arms
- Location of Fayet-le-Château
- Location within France Location within Auvergne-Rhône-Alpes
- Coordinates: 45°40′45″N 3°24′45″E
- Country: France
- Region: Auvergne-Rhône-Alpes
- Department: Puy-de-Dôme
- Arrondissement: Clermont-Ferrand
- Canton: Billom
- Intercommunality: Billom Communauté

Government
  - Mayor (2020–2026): Bruno Valladier
- Area^{1}: 12.54 km^{2} (4.84 sq mi)
- Elevation: 650 m (2,130 ft)
- Highest elevation: 760 m (2,490 ft)
- Lowest elevation: 490 m (1,610 ft)
- Population (2023): 381
  - Density: 30.4/km^{2} (78.7/sq mi)
- Time zone: UTC+01:00 (CET)
  - Summer (DST): UTC+02:00 (CEST)
- INSEE/Postal code: 63157 /63160
- ^{1} French Land Register data, which excludes lakes, ponds, glaciers > 1 km^{2} (0.386 sq mi or 247 acres) and river estuaries.

Fayet-le-Château (French: [fajɛ l(ə) ʃɑto]; Occitan: Faiet lo Chastèl) is a commune in the Puy-de-Dôme department in Auvergne in central France.

== See also ==
- Communes of the Puy-de-Dôme department
