= Chauriat =

- Commune
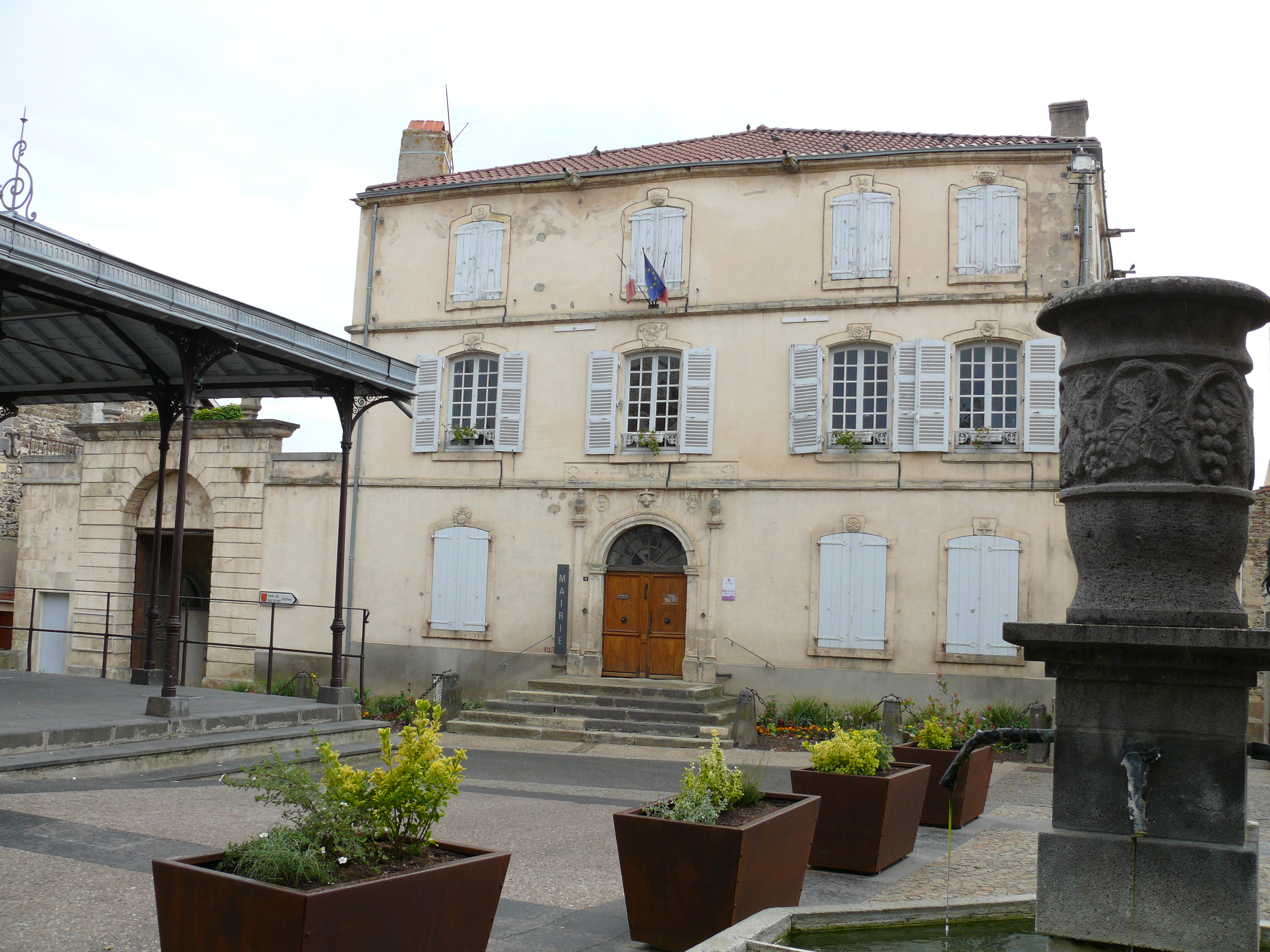
- The town hall in Chauriat

- Coat of arms
- Location of Chauriat
- Location within France Location within Auvergne-Rhône-Alpes
- Coordinates: 45°45′07″N 3°16′47″E
- Country: France
- Region: Auvergne-Rhône-Alpes
- Department: Puy-de-Dôme
- Arrondissement: Clermont-Ferrand
- Canton: Billom
- Intercommunality: Billom Communauté

Government
  - Mayor (2026–32): Maurice Deschamps
- Area^{1}: 8.64 km^{2} (3.34 sq mi)
- Elevation: 410 m (1,350 ft)
- Highest elevation: 539 m (1,768 ft)
- Lowest elevation: 357 m (1,171 ft)
- Population (2023): 1,805
  - Density: 209/km^{2} (541/sq mi)
- Time zone: UTC+01:00 (CET)
  - Summer (DST): UTC+02:00 (CEST)
- INSEE/Postal code: 63106 /63117
- ^{1} French Land Register data, which excludes lakes, ponds, glaciers > 1 km^{2} (0.386 sq mi or 247 acres) and river estuaries.

Chauriat (French pronunciation: [ʃoʁja]) is a commune in the Puy-de-Dôme department in Auvergne-Rhône-Alpes in central France. It is part of the canton of Billom.

== See also ==
- Communes of the Puy-de-Dôme department
