= Vertaizon =

- Commune
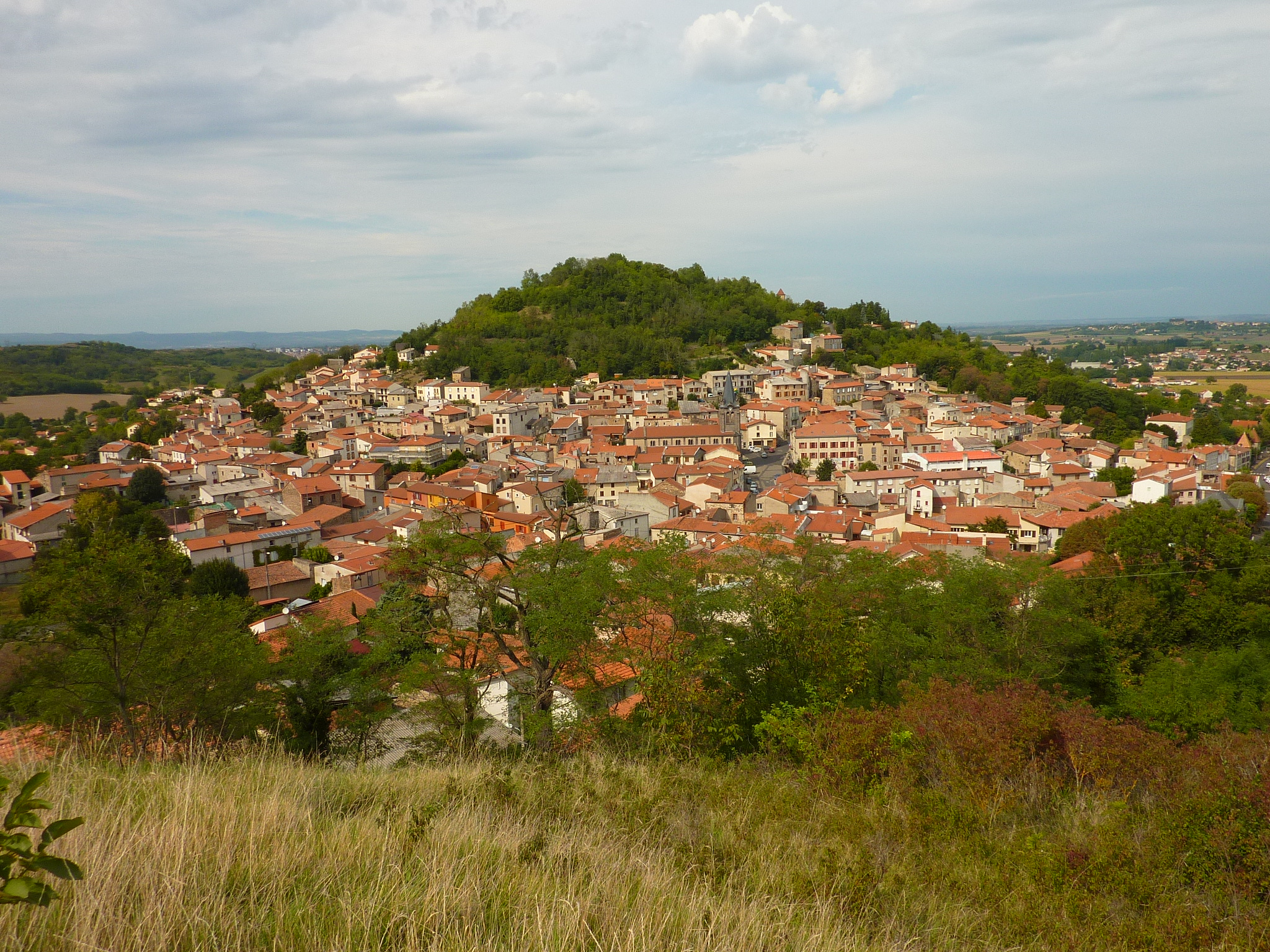
- A general view of Vertaizon

- Coat of arms
- Location of Vertaizon
- Location within France Location within Auvergne-Rhône-Alpes
- Coordinates: 45°46′15″N 3°17′14″E
- Country: France
- Region: Auvergne-Rhône-Alpes
- Department: Puy-de-Dôme
- Arrondissement: Clermont-Ferrand
- Canton: Billom
- Intercommunality: Billom Communauté

Government
  - Mayor (2026–32): Boris Coissard
- Area^{1}: 12.83 km^{2} (4.95 sq mi)
- Elevation: 370 m (1,210 ft)
- Highest elevation: 594 m (1,949 ft)
- Lowest elevation: 306 m (1,004 ft)
- Population (2023): 3,527
  - Density: 274.9/km^{2} (712.0/sq mi)
- Time zone: UTC+01:00 (CET)
  - Summer (DST): UTC+02:00 (CEST)
- INSEE/Postal code: 63453 /63910
- ^{1} French Land Register data, which excludes lakes, ponds, glaciers > 1 km^{2} (0.386 sq mi or 247 acres) and river estuaries.

Vertaizon (French pronunciation: [vɛʁtɛzɔ̃]; Occitan: Vartaizon) is a commune of the department of Puy-de-Dôme in the region Auvergne-Rhône-Alpes. It is part of the urban area of Clermont-Ferrand.

== Geography ==
=== Location ===
Vertaizon is built on a hill giving a view on the Limagne and Pont-du-Château from its summit, where is situated the ancienne église ("the Ancient church") and the wall from the former castle (destroyed on the orders of Cardinal de Richelieu during the 17th century).

The commune stretches from the foot of the hill to the lieu-dit Chignat.

== History ==
The foire de Chignat ("fair of Chignat"), former "melons' fair", is one of the oldest fairs in France: its oldest occurrence in documents is from 1303. This event takes place every year at the beginning of September in the field near the Castle of Chignat.

In 1195, the lordship of Vertaizon belonged to the troubadour Pons de Chapteuil, who was eventually attacked by bishop Robert de Clermont, at war with his brother the count Guy II d'Auvergne, a close friend of the lord of the city.

== Population ==
Historical population
Year	Pop.	±% p.a.
1968	1,882	—
1975	1,979	+0.72%
1982	2,033	+0.39%
1990	2,156	+0.74%
1999	2,278	+0.61%
2007	2,876	+2.96%
2012	3,184	+2.06%
2017	3,187	+0.02%
2023	3,527	+1.70%
Source: INSEE

== Economy ==
The town possess a commercial area and two Adapei (Association Départementale des Amis et Parents de Personnes Handicapées Mentales, "Departmental Association of Friends and Relatives of Mentally Disabled Persons").

=== Shops ===
Eight shops were identified in 2014 : one grocery store, three bakers, one library-newspaper seller, one watchmaker-jeweler and two florists.

== Cultural aspects ==
=== Landmarks and monuments ===
- Ruins of the castle (on a private property)
- Old church "Notre-Dame" from the 13th century
Ancient church of Vertaizon

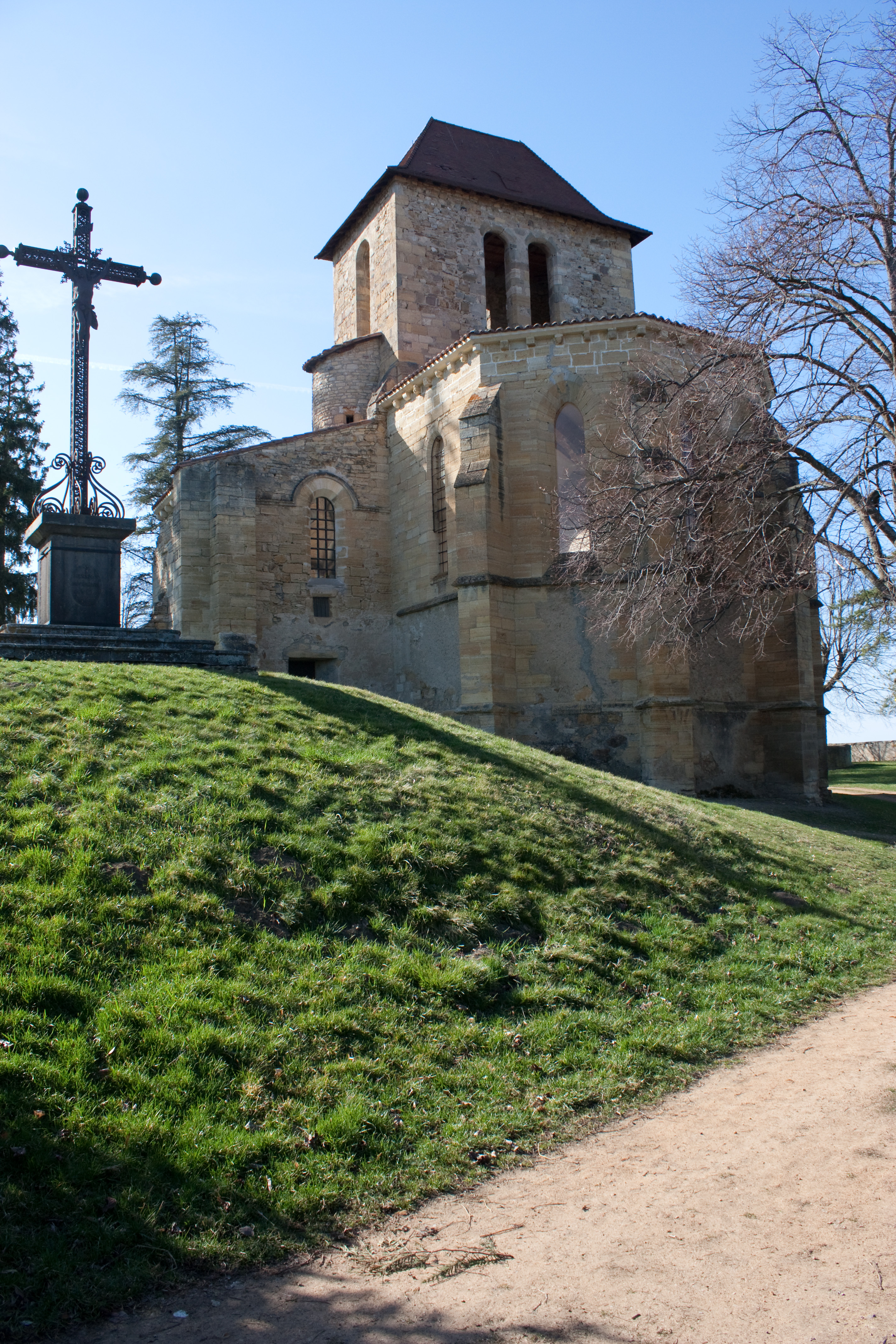
Back view

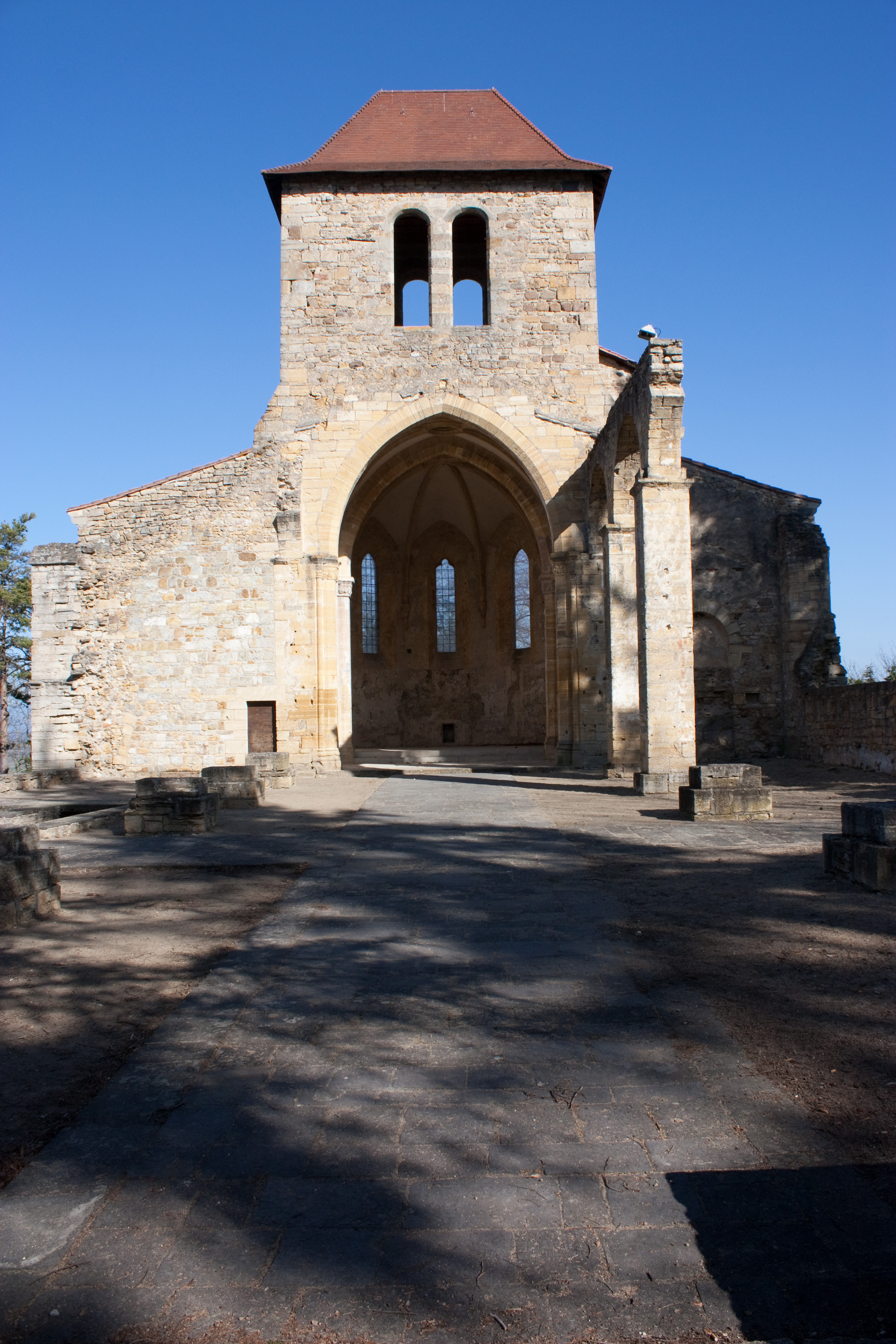
Interior

=== Famous personalities ===
- Pons de Chapteuil, troubadour from Auvergne
- Prosper Marilhat, painter
- Xavier Esterre de la Fonseca, professional football player

== See also ==
- Communes of the Puy-de-Dôme department
