= Trézioux =

- Commune
- Location of Trézioux
- Location within France Location within Auvergne-Rhône-Alpes
- Coordinates: 45°43′24″N 3°28′18″E
- Country: France
- Region: Auvergne-Rhône-Alpes
- Department: Puy-de-Dôme
- Arrondissement: Clermont-Ferrand
- Canton: Billom
- Intercommunality: Billom Communauté

Government
  - Mayor (2026–32): Hubert Cheminat
- Area^{1}: 17.44 km^{2} (6.73 sq mi)
- Elevation: 570 m (1,870 ft)
- Highest elevation: 617 m (2,024 ft)
- Lowest elevation: 377 m (1,237 ft)
- Population (2023): 502
  - Density: 28.8/km^{2} (74.6/sq mi)
- Time zone: UTC+01:00 (CET)
  - Summer (DST): UTC+02:00 (CEST)
- INSEE/Postal code: 63438 /63520
- ^{1} French Land Register data, which excludes lakes, ponds, glaciers > 1 km^{2} (0.386 sq mi or 247 acres) and river estuaries.

Trézioux (French pronunciation: [tʁezju]; Occitan: Tresiu) is a commune in the Puy-de-Dôme department in Auvergne in central France.

== See also ==
- Communes of the Puy-de-Dôme department
