= Vassel =

- Commune
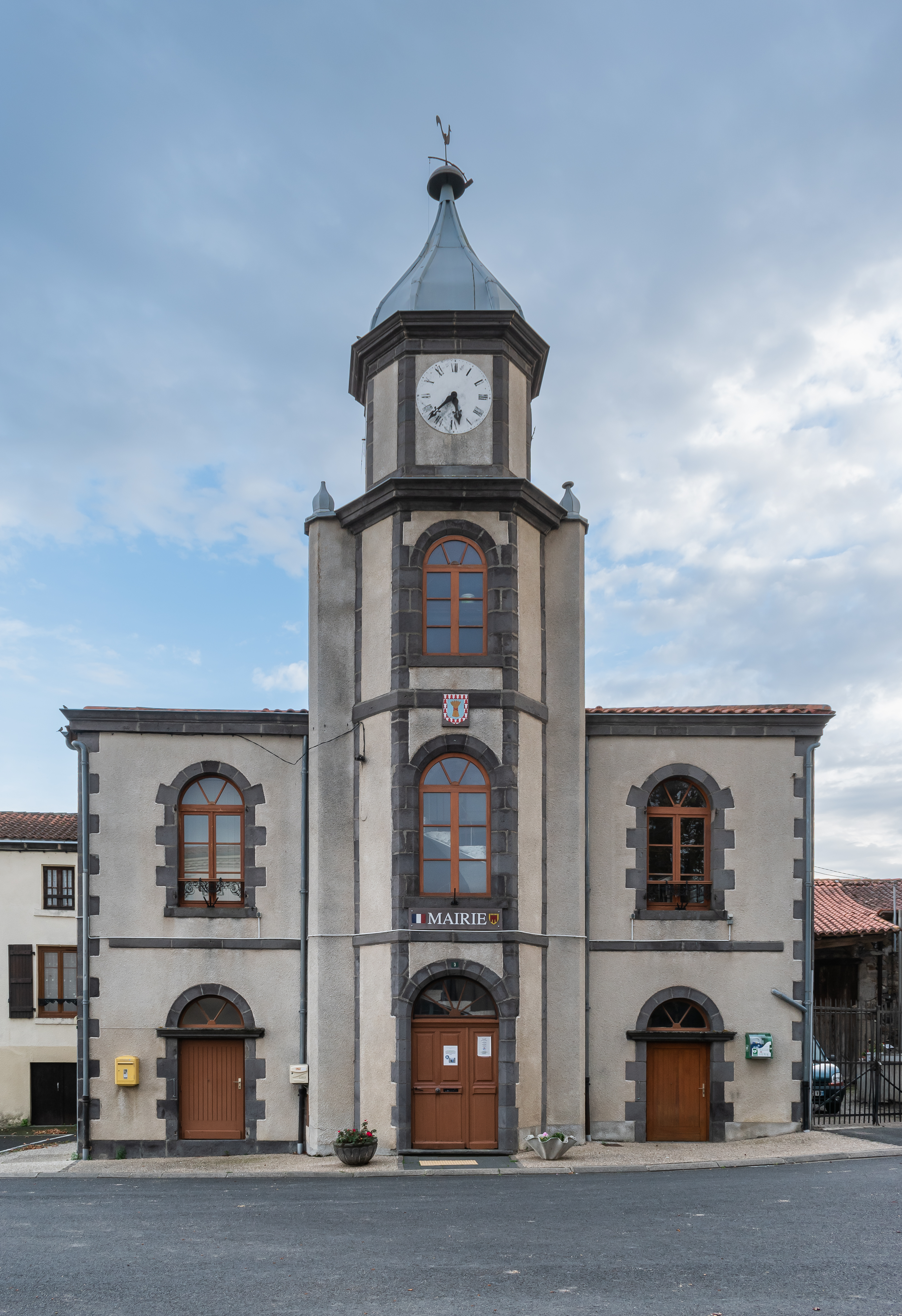
- Town hall

- Coat of arms
- Location of Vassel
- Location within France Location within Auvergne-Rhône-Alpes
- Coordinates: 45°45′57″N 3°18′39″E
- Country: France
- Region: Auvergne-Rhône-Alpes
- Department: Puy-de-Dôme
- Arrondissement: Clermont-Ferrand
- Canton: Billom
- Intercommunality: Billom Communauté

Government
  - Mayor (2020–2026): Françoise Bernard
- Area^{1}: 2.95 km^{2} (1.14 sq mi)
- Elevation: 323 m (1,060 ft)
- Highest elevation: 463 m (1,519 ft)
- Lowest elevation: 325 m (1,066 ft)
- Population (2023): 295
  - Density: 100/km^{2} (259/sq mi)
- Demonym: Vasselois
- Time zone: UTC+01:00 (CET)
  - Summer (DST): UTC+02:00 (CEST)
- INSEE/Postal code: 63445 /63910
- ^{1} French Land Register data, which excludes lakes, ponds, glaciers > 1 km^{2} (0.386 sq mi or 247 acres) and river estuaries.

Vassel (French pronunciation: [vasɛl]) is a commune in the Puy-de-Dôme department in Auvergne-Rhône-Alpes in central France.

Its inhabitants are called Vasselois.

== See also ==
- Communes of the Puy-de-Dôme department
