= Clotilde Dissard =

French journalist and feminist (1873–1919)

- Born: Marie Joséphine Clotilde Loubaresse; 10 November 1873; Saint-Dier-d'Auvergne, France
- Died: 1919 (aged 45–46)
- Occupations: journalist; feminist; writer
- Spouse: Antoine Dissard (m. 1894)
- Writing career
- Language: French
- Genre: non-fiction

Clotilde Dissard (née, Loubaresse; 10 November 1873 – 1919) was a French journalist and feminist. She founded the journal, La Revue feministe.

== Biography ==
Marie Joséphine Clotilde Loubaresse was born in Saint-Dier-d'Auvergne, 10 November 1873. She was the daughter of Pierre Loubaresse, a clockmaker, and Marie Joséphine née Fayot.

In 1894, in her birthplace, she married Antoine Dissard, a laboratory assistant at the Paris faculty of medicine, and adopted the name Clotilde Dissard.

In October 1895, she founded the journal, La Revue feministe. The following year, together with Alphonse Roux, (Note: Dissard had her husband's permission.) Dissard established Roux et Dissard, the publisher of La Revue feministe. Publication of the journal ceased in 1897. Dissard was the author of several books on the status of women and their rights. She contributed to asserting a feminine identity, which was in no way secondary or inferior, but which was quite specific. Convinced there was a "sharing of aesthetic qualities" between the sexes, she explained in La Revue feministe that "more perhaps than by the exquisite simplicity of the body, the feminine soul is enchanted by the brilliance of color, the delicacy of nuances, the warm harmony of shades, and the diversity and subtlety of scents". She also contributed to the newspaper La Fronde and the Revue internationale de sociologie. Dissard served as president of the Syndicat de la presse feministe. She was interested in the working conditions of women and the harassment to which they could be subjected. She also wrote on the issue of prostitution. Clotilde Dissard died in 1919.

== Selected works ==
=== Books ===
- Opinions féministes : à propos du Congrès féministe de Paris de 1896, Paris, V. Giard & E. Brière, 1896. (in French)

=== Articles ===
- "Impressions sur le Congrès féministe", La Revue féministe, 1896 (in French)
- "Le Congrès féministe de Paris de 1896", Revue internationale de sociologie, 1896 (in French)
- "La traite des blanches", La Fronde, 16 August 1899 (in French)
- "La Protection du travail féminine", La Fronde, 29 January 1900 (in French)
