= Bongheat =

- Commune
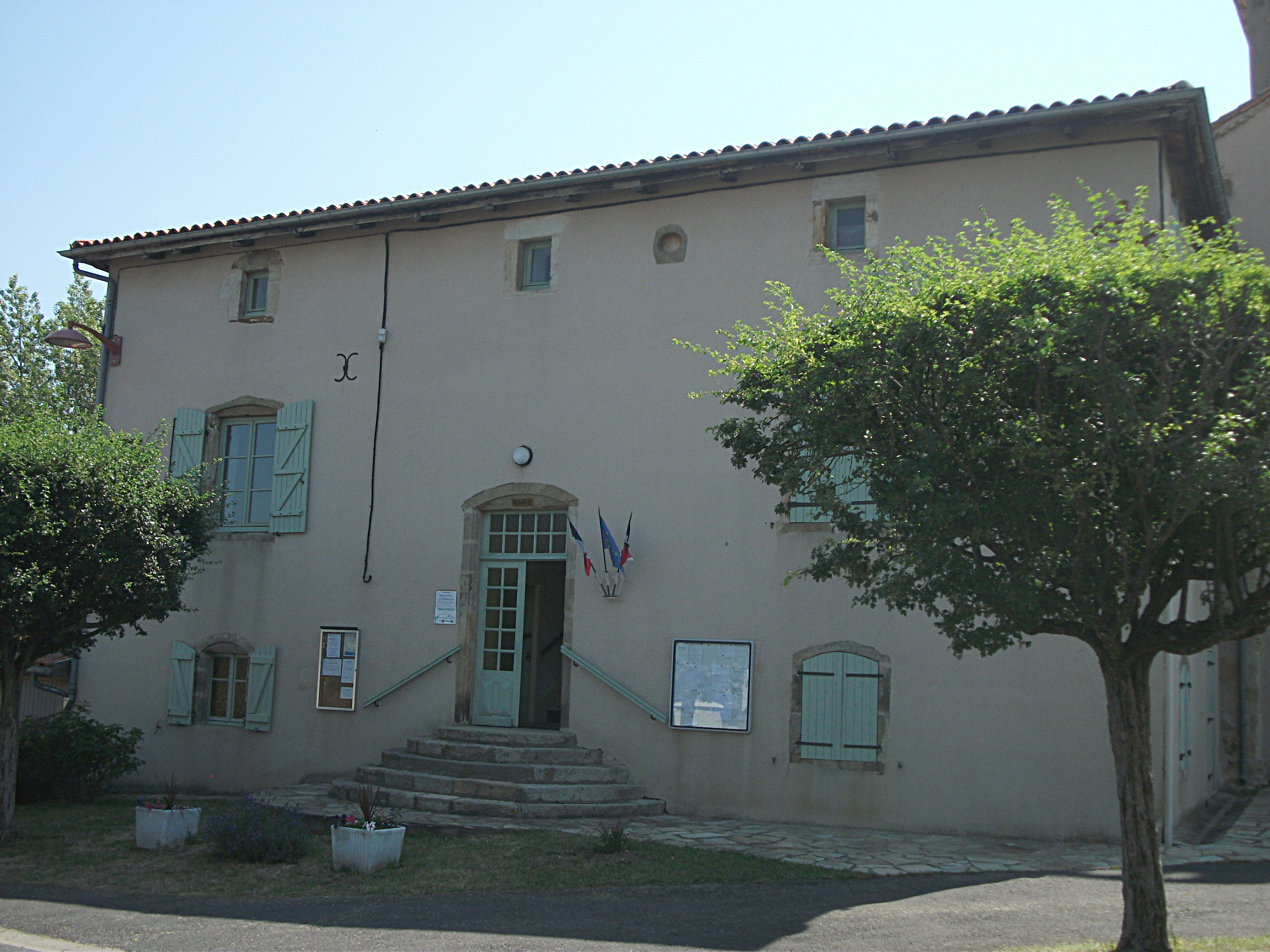
- Town hall
- Location of Bongheat
- Location within France Location within Auvergne-Rhône-Alpes
- Coordinates: 45°43′40″N 3°25′38″E
- Country: France
- Region: Auvergne-Rhône-Alpes
- Department: Puy-de-Dôme
- Arrondissement: Clermont-Ferrand
- Canton: Billom
- Intercommunality: Billom Communauté

Government
  - Mayor (2026–32): Lydie Garino
- Area^{1}: 11.20 km^{2} (4.32 sq mi)
- Elevation: 457 m (1,499 ft)
- Highest elevation: 621 m (2,037 ft)
- Lowest elevation: 363 m (1,191 ft)
- Population (2023): 465
  - Density: 41.5/km^{2} (108/sq mi)
- Time zone: UTC+01:00 (CET)
  - Summer (DST): UTC+02:00 (CEST)
- INSEE/Postal code: 63044 /63160
- ^{1} French Land Register data, which excludes lakes, ponds, glaciers > 1 km^{2} (0.386 sq mi or 247 acres) and river estuaries.

Bongheat (French pronunciation: [bɔ̃ʒa]; Occitan: Bonjat) is a commune in the Puy-de-Dôme department in Auvergne-Rhône-Alpes in central France.

== Population ==
Historical population
Year	Pop.	±% p.a.
1968	239	—
1975	198	−2.65%
1982	205	+0.50%
1990	221	+0.94%
1999	241	+0.97%
2007	331	+4.05%
2012	423	+5.03%
2017	427	+0.19%
2023	465	+1.43%
Source: INSEE

== See also ==
- Communes of the Puy-de-Dôme department
