= Égliseneuve-près-Billom =

- Commune
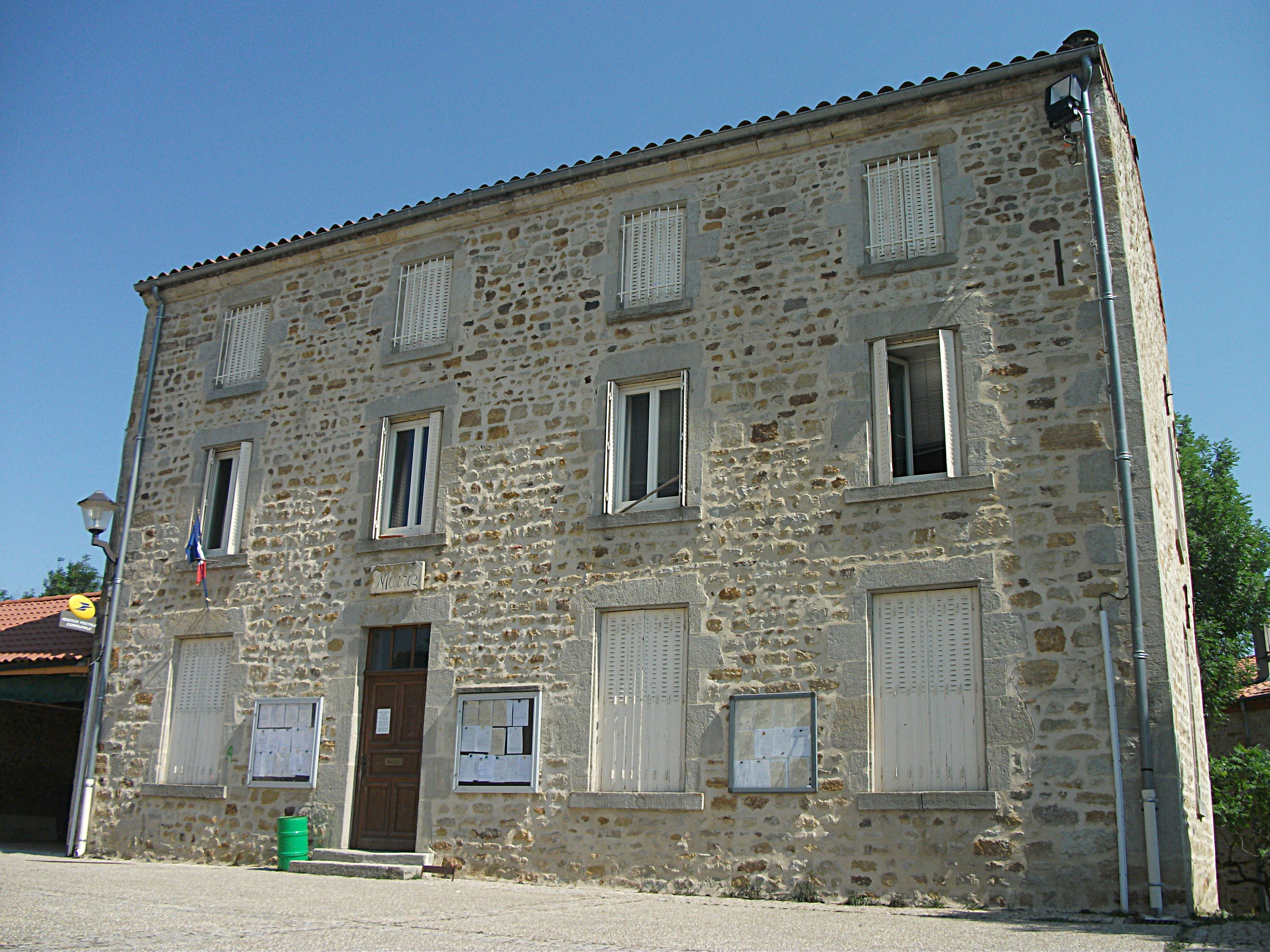
- The town hall in Égliseneuve-près-Billom

- Coat of arms
- Location of Égliseneuve-près-Billom
- Location within France Location within Auvergne-Rhône-Alpes
- Coordinates: 45°43′21″N 3°23′30″E
- Country: France
- Region: Auvergne-Rhône-Alpes
- Department: Puy-de-Dôme
- Arrondissement: Clermont-Ferrand
- Canton: Billom
- Intercommunality: Billom Communauté

Government
  - Mayor (2020–2026): Daniel Salles
- Area^{1}: 16.66 km^{2} (6.43 sq mi)
- Elevation: 506 m (1,660 ft)
- Highest elevation: 640 m (2,100 ft)
- Lowest elevation: 356 m (1,168 ft)
- Population (2023): 937
  - Density: 56.2/km^{2} (146/sq mi)
- Time zone: UTC+01:00 (CET)
  - Summer (DST): UTC+02:00 (CEST)
- INSEE/Postal code: 63146 /63160
- ^{1} French Land Register data, which excludes lakes, ponds, glaciers > 1 km^{2} (0.386 sq mi or 247 acres) and river estuaries.

Égliseneuve-près-Billom (French pronunciation: [eɡliznœv pʁɛ bijɔ̃], literally Égliseneuve near Billom; Occitan: Gleianèva de Bilhom) is a commune in the Puy-de-Dôme department in Auvergne in central France.

== See also ==
- Communes of the Puy-de-Dôme department
