= Isserteaux =

- Commune
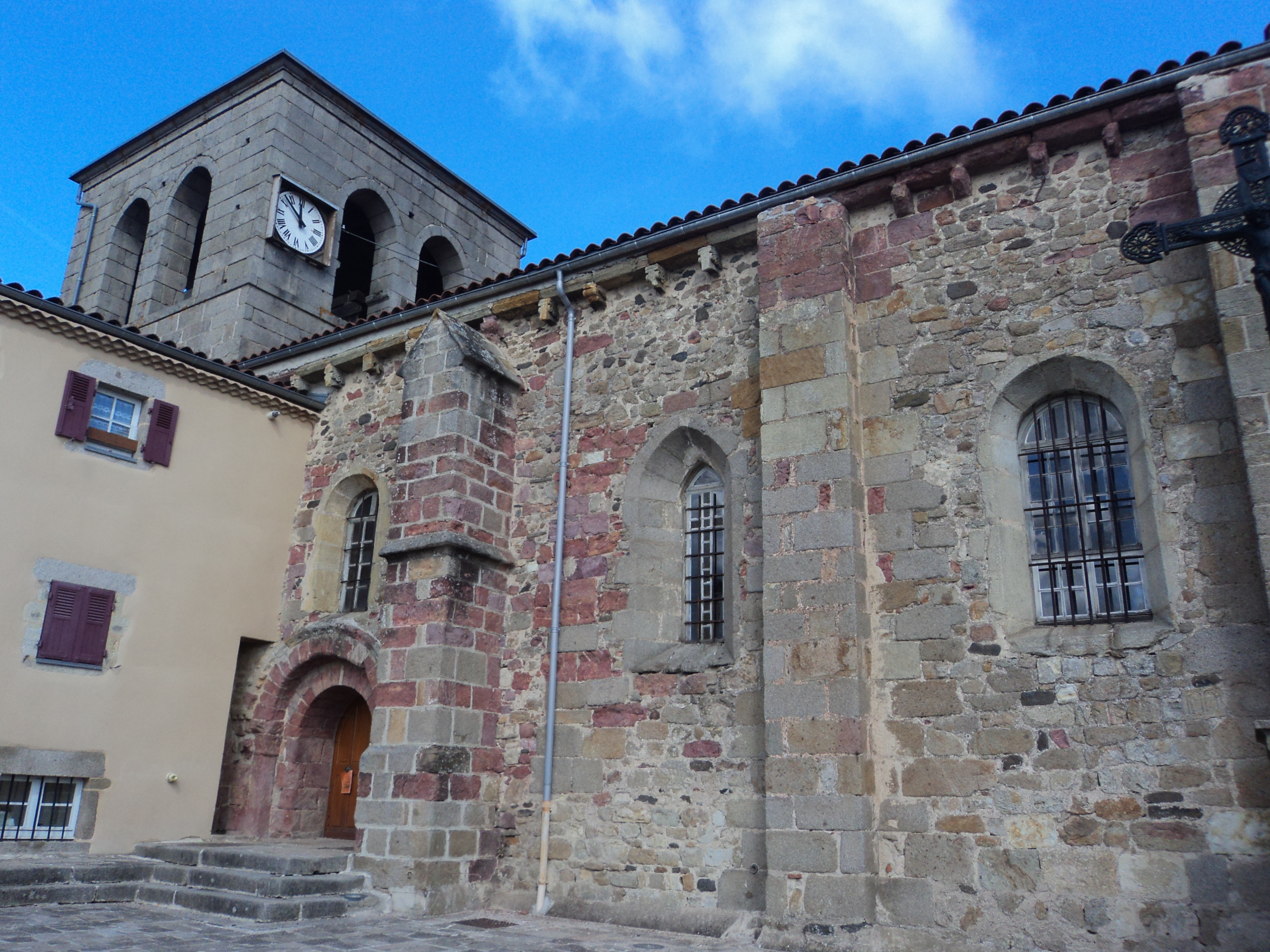
- The church in Isserteaux
- Location of Isserteaux
- Location within France Location within Auvergne-Rhône-Alpes
- Coordinates: 45°39′12″N 3°23′19″E
- Country: France
- Region: Auvergne-Rhône-Alpes
- Department: Puy-de-Dôme
- Arrondissement: Clermont-Ferrand
- Canton: Billom
- Intercommunality: Billom Communauté

Government
  - Mayor (2026–32): Jean-Claude Batisson
- Area^{1}: 17.66 km^{2} (6.82 sq mi)
- Elevation: 693 m (2,274 ft)
- Highest elevation: 789 m (2,589 ft)
- Lowest elevation: 459 m (1,506 ft)
- Population (2023): 416
  - Density: 23.6/km^{2} (61.0/sq mi)
- Time zone: UTC+01:00 (CET)
  - Summer (DST): UTC+02:00 (CEST)
- INSEE/Postal code: 63177 /63270
- ^{1} French Land Register data, which excludes lakes, ponds, glaciers > 1 km^{2} (0.386 sq mi or 247 acres) and river estuaries.

Isserteaux (French pronunciation: [isɛʁto]; Occitan: Issartèl) is a commune in the Puy-de-Dôme department in Auvergne in central France.

== See also ==
- Communes of the Puy-de-Dôme department
