= Chas, Puy-de-Dôme =

Chas
- Commune
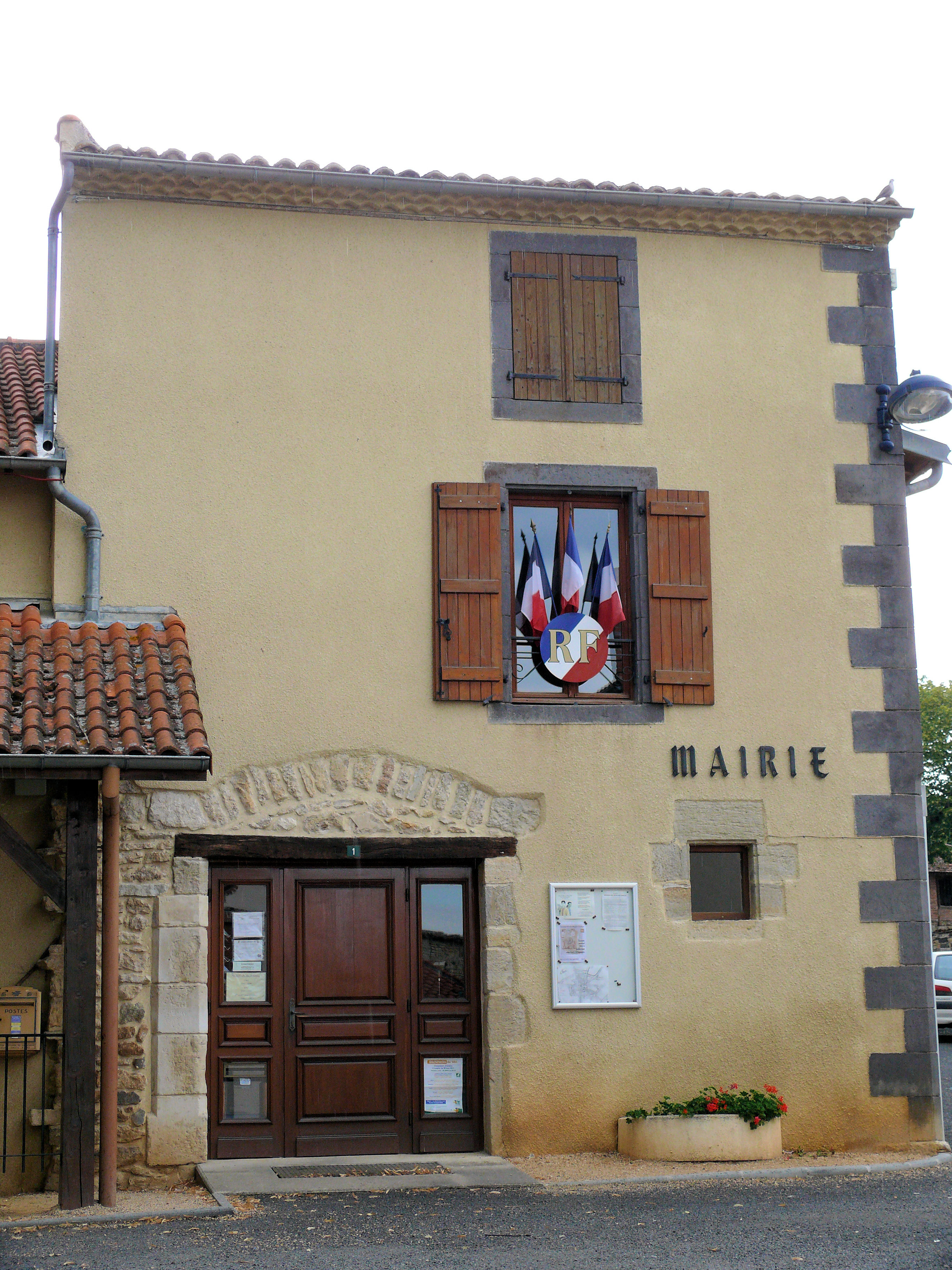
- The town hall in Chas

- Coat of arms
- Location of Chas
- Location within France Location within Auvergne-Rhône-Alpes
- Coordinates: 45°44′59″N 3°18′08″E
- Country: France
- Region: Auvergne-Rhône-Alpes
- Department: Puy-de-Dôme
- Arrondissement: Clermont-Ferrand
- Canton: Billom
- Intercommunality: Billom Communauté

Government
  - Mayor (2020–2026): Bernadette Dutheil
- Area^{1}: 3.52 km^{2} (1.36 sq mi)
- Highest elevation: 450 m (1,480 ft)
- Lowest elevation: 338 m (1,109 ft)
- Population (2023): 361
  - Density: 103/km^{2} (266/sq mi)
- Time zone: UTC+01:00 (CET)
  - Summer (DST): UTC+02:00 (CEST)
- INSEE/Postal code: 63096 /63160
- ^{1} French Land Register data, which excludes lakes, ponds, glaciers > 1 km^{2} (0.386 sq mi or 247 acres) and river estuaries.

Chas is a commune in the Puy-de-Dôme department in Auvergne-Rhône-Alpes in central France. It is part of the canton of Billom and the communauté de communes Billom Communauté.

== See also ==
- Communes of the Puy-de-Dôme department
