= Saint-Julien-de-Coppel =

- Commune
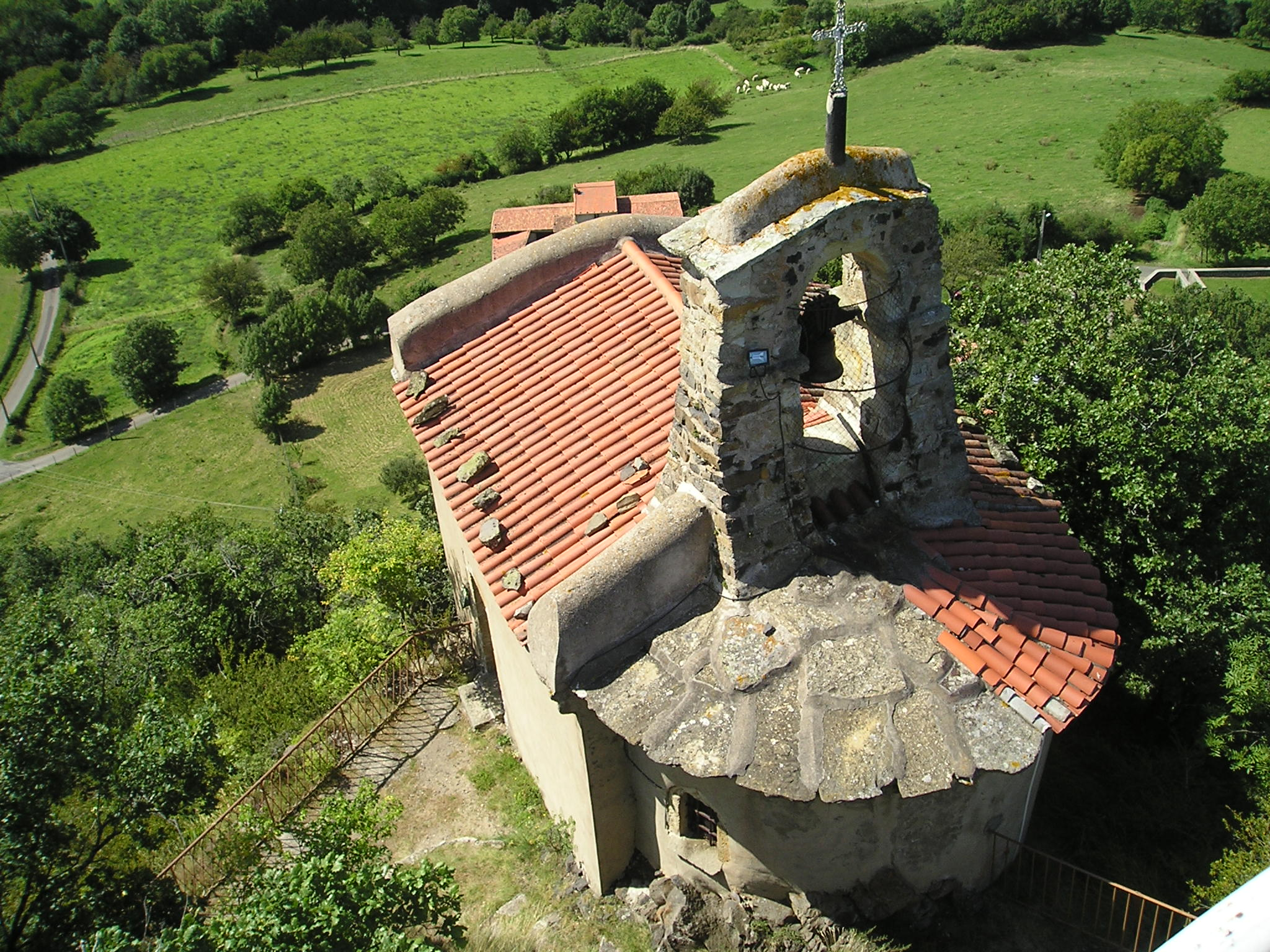
- The church in Saint-Julien-de-Coppel

- Coat of arms
- Location of Saint-Julien-de-Coppel
- Location within France Location within Auvergne-Rhône-Alpes
- Coordinates: 45°41′42″N 3°18′40″E
- Country: France
- Region: Auvergne-Rhône-Alpes
- Department: Puy-de-Dôme
- Arrondissement: Clermont-Ferrand
- Canton: Billom

Government
  - Mayor (2026–32): Dominique Vauris
- Area^{1}: 21.54 km^{2} (8.32 sq mi)
- Elevation: 450 m (1,480 ft)
- Highest elevation: 782 m (2,566 ft)
- Lowest elevation: 375 m (1,230 ft)
- Population (2023): 1,281
  - Density: 59.47/km^{2} (154.0/sq mi)
- Time zone: UTC+01:00 (CET)
  - Summer (DST): UTC+02:00 (CEST)
- INSEE/Postal code: 63368 /63160
- ^{1} French Land Register data, which excludes lakes, ponds, glaciers > 1 km^{2} (0.386 sq mi or 247 acres) and river estuaries.

Saint-Julien-de-Coppel (French pronunciation: [sɛ̃ ʒyljɛ̃ də kɔpɛl]) is a commune in the Puy-de-Dôme department in Auvergne in central France.

== See also ==
- Communes of the Puy-de-Dôme department
