= Bouzel =

- Commune
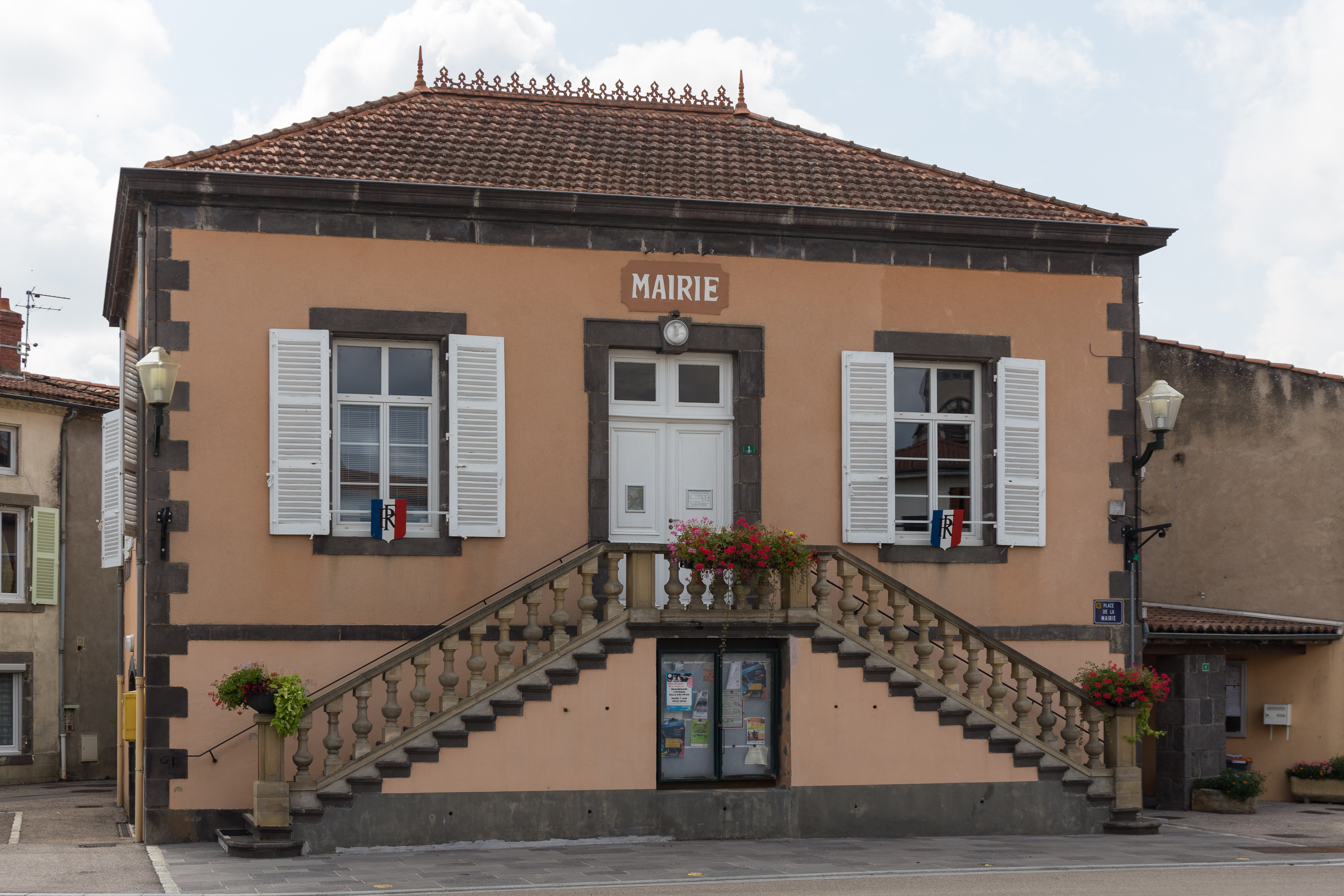
- Town hall

- Coat of arms
- Location of Bouzel
- Location within France Location within Auvergne-Rhône-Alpes
- Coordinates: 45°46′41″N 3°19′05″E
- Country: France
- Region: Auvergne-Rhône-Alpes
- Department: Puy-de-Dôme
- Arrondissement: Clermont-Ferrand
- Canton: Billom
- Intercommunality: Billom Communauté

Government
  - Mayor (2026–32): Suzanne Delarbre
- Area^{1}: 4.21 km^{2} (1.63 sq mi)
- Elevation: 321 m (1,053 ft)
- Highest elevation: 338 m (1,109 ft)
- Lowest elevation: 317 m (1,040 ft)
- Population (2023): 703
  - Density: 167/km^{2} (432/sq mi)
- Demonym: Bouzellois
- Time zone: UTC+01:00 (CET)
  - Summer (DST): UTC+02:00 (CEST)
- INSEE/Postal code: 63049 /63910
- ^{1} French Land Register data, which excludes lakes, ponds, glaciers > 1 km^{2} (0.386 sq mi or 247 acres) and river estuaries.

Bouzel (French pronunciation: [buzɛl]) is a commune in the Puy-de-Dôme department in Auvergne-Rhône-Alpes in central France.

Its inhabitants are called Bouzellois in French.

== Population ==
Historical population
Year	Pop.	±% p.a.
1968	337	—
1975	321	−0.69%
1982	457	+5.18%
1990	510	+1.38%
1999	507	−0.07%
2007	687	+3.87%
2012	706	+0.55%
2017	727	+0.59%
2023	703	−0.56%
Source: INSEE

== See also ==
- Communes of the Puy-de-Dôme department
