= Reignat =

- Commune
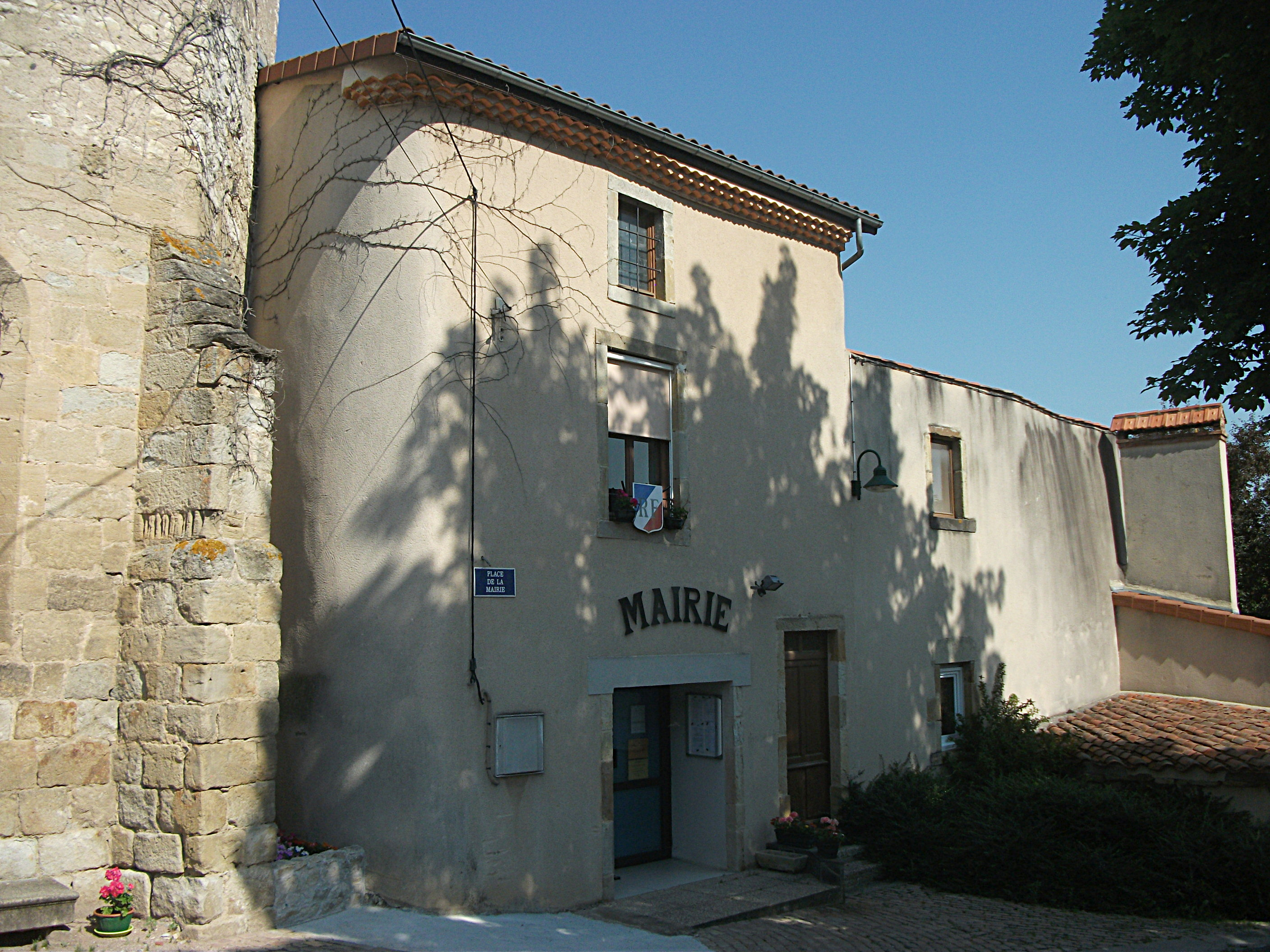
- Town hall

- Coat of arms
- Location of Reignat
- Location within France Location within Auvergne-Rhône-Alpes
- Coordinates: 45°45′N 3°21′E
- Country: France
- Region: Auvergne-Rhône-Alpes
- Department: Puy-de-Dôme
- Arrondissement: Clermont-Ferrand
- Canton: Billom
- Intercommunality: Billom Communauté

Government
  - Mayor (2026–32): Janick Derrien
- Area^{1}: 4.1 km^{2} (1.6 sq mi)
- Elevation: 402 m (1,319 ft)
- Highest elevation: 460 m (1,510 ft)
- Lowest elevation: 335 m (1,099 ft)
- Population (2023): 382
  - Density: 93/km^{2} (240/sq mi)
- Demonym: Reignatois
- Time zone: UTC+01:00 (CET)
  - Summer (DST): UTC+02:00 (CEST)
- INSEE/Postal code: 63297 /63160
- ^{1} French Land Register data, which excludes lakes, ponds, glaciers > 1 km^{2} (0.386 sq mi or 247 acres) and river estuaries.

Reignat (French pronunciation: [ʁɛɲa]) is a commune in the Puy-de-Dôme department in Auvergne-Rhône-Alpes in central France.

Its inhabitants are called Reignatois.

== See also ==
- Communes of the Puy-de-Dôme department
