= Neuville, Puy-de-Dôme =

Neuville
- Commune
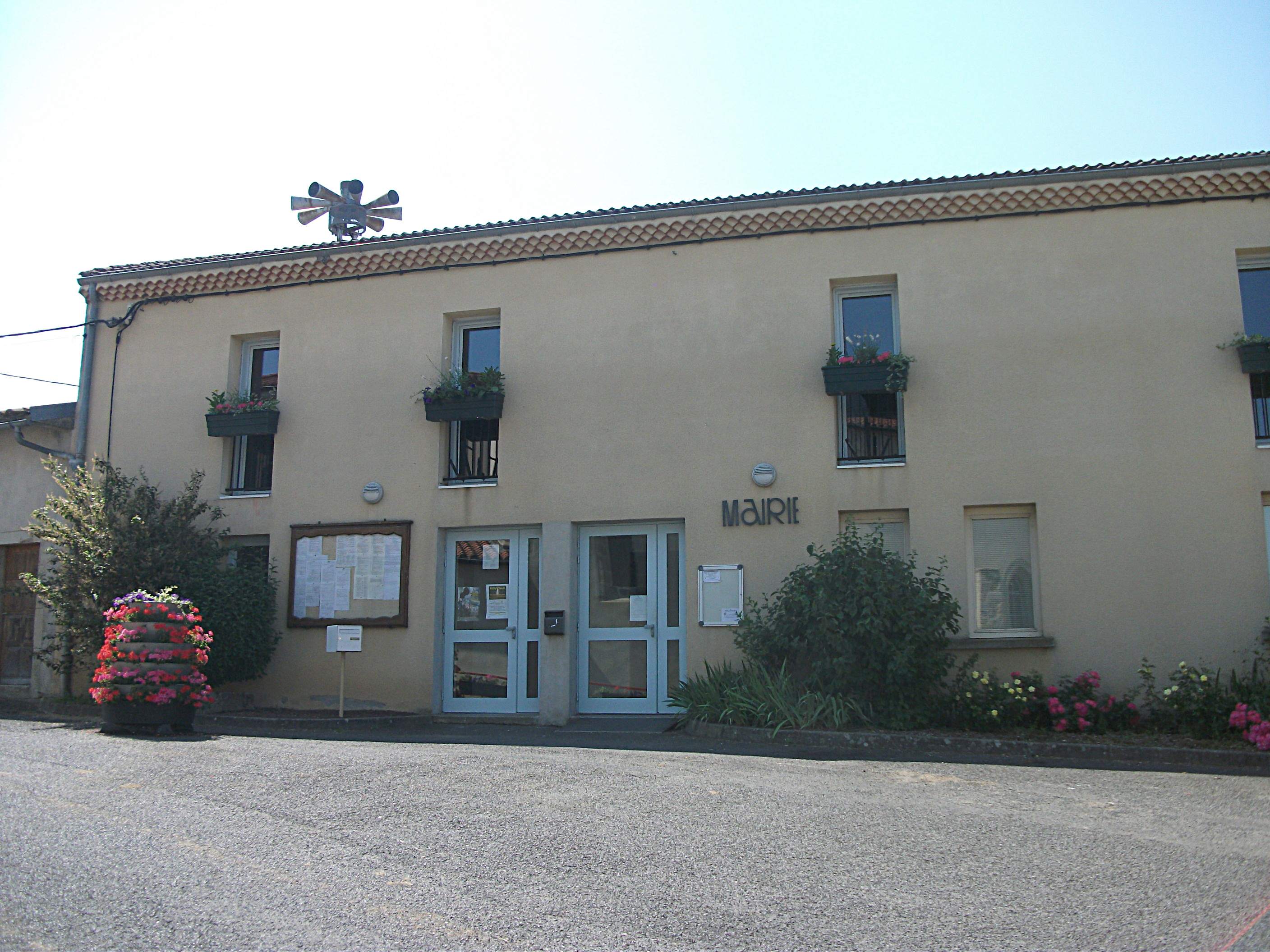
- Town hall
- Location of Neuville
- Location within France Location within Auvergne-Rhône-Alpes
- Coordinates: 45°44′42″N 3°26′10″E
- Country: France
- Region: Auvergne-Rhône-Alpes
- Department: Puy-de-Dôme
- Arrondissement: Clermont-Ferrand
- Canton: Billom
- Intercommunality: Billom Communauté

Government
  - Mayor (2026–32): Jérôme Pireyre
- Area^{1}: 11.55 km^{2} (4.46 sq mi)
- Elevation: 400 m (1,300 ft)
- Highest elevation: 494 m (1,621 ft)
- Lowest elevation: 342 m (1,122 ft)
- Population (2023): 373
  - Density: 32.3/km^{2} (83.6/sq mi)
- Time zone: UTC+01:00 (CET)
  - Summer (DST): UTC+02:00 (CEST)
- INSEE/Postal code: 63252 /63160
- ^{1} French Land Register data, which excludes lakes, ponds, glaciers > 1 km^{2} (0.386 sq mi or 247 acres) and river estuaries.

Neuville (French pronunciation: [nøvil]; Occitan: Neuviala) is a commune in the Puy-de-Dôme department in Auvergne-Rhône-Alpes in central France.

== See also ==
- Communes of the Puy-de-Dôme department
