= Mauzun =

- Commune
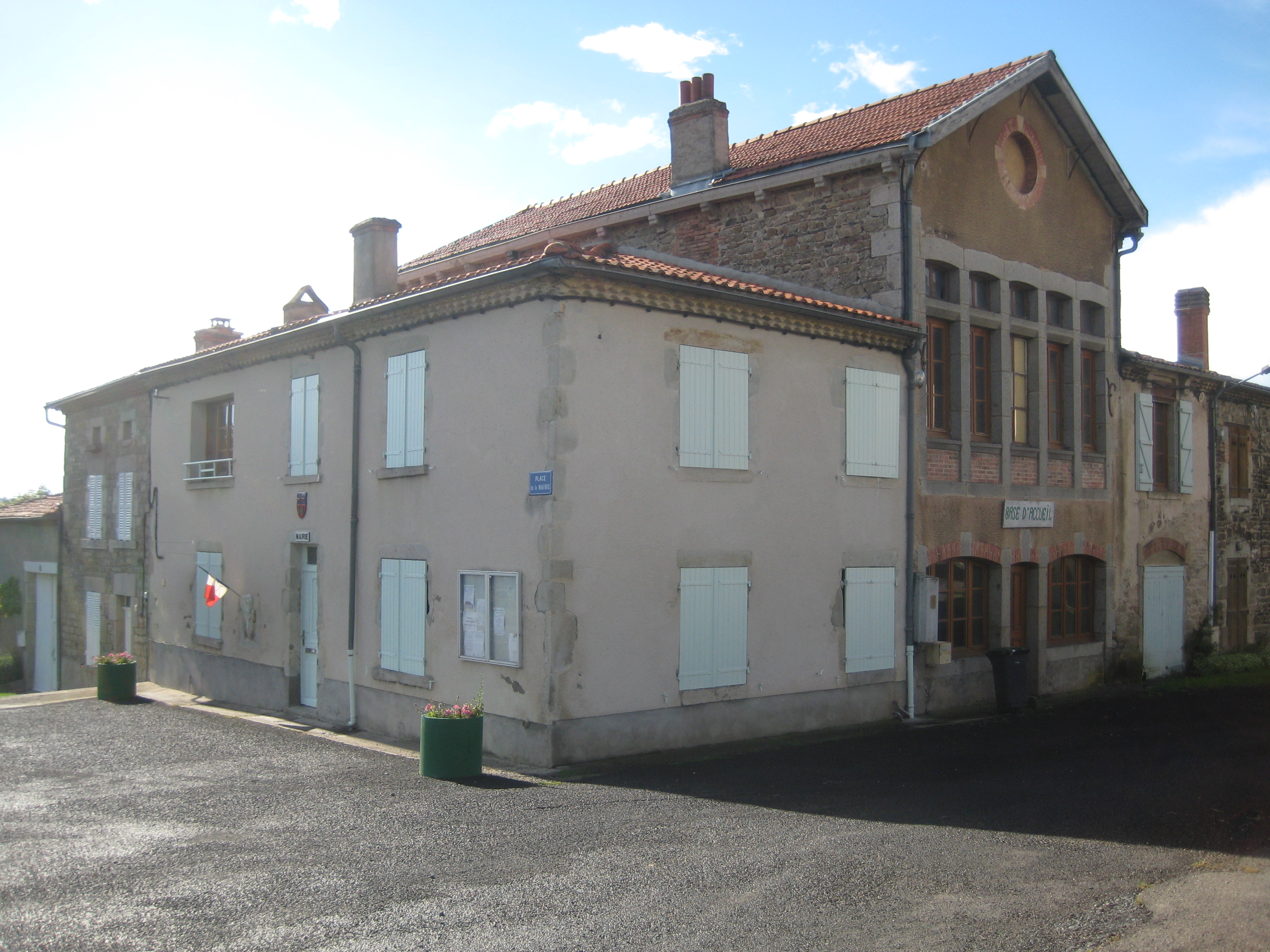
- The town hall in Mauzun

- Coat of arms
- Location of Mauzun
- Location within France Location within Auvergne-Rhône-Alpes
- Coordinates: 45°42′15″N 3°25′54″E
- Country: France
- Region: Auvergne-Rhône-Alpes
- Department: Puy-de-Dôme
- Arrondissement: Clermont-Ferrand
- Canton: Billom
- Intercommunality: Billom Communauté

Government
  - Mayor (2020–2026): Christiane Taillandier
- Area^{1}: 0.99 km^{2} (0.38 sq mi)
- Elevation: 625 m (2,051 ft)
- Highest elevation: 652 m (2,139 ft)
- Lowest elevation: 500 m (1,600 ft)
- Population (2023): 140
  - Density: 140/km^{2} (370/sq mi)
- Time zone: UTC+01:00 (CET)
  - Summer (DST): UTC+02:00 (CEST)
- INSEE/Postal code: 63216 /63160
- ^{1} French Land Register data, which excludes lakes, ponds, glaciers > 1 km^{2} (0.386 sq mi or 247 acres) and river estuaries.

Mauzun (French pronunciation: [mozœ̃]; Occitan: Mausun) is a commune in the Puy-de-Dôme department in Auvergne in central France.

== See also ==
- Communes of the Puy-de-Dôme department
