= Glaine-Montaigut =

- Commune
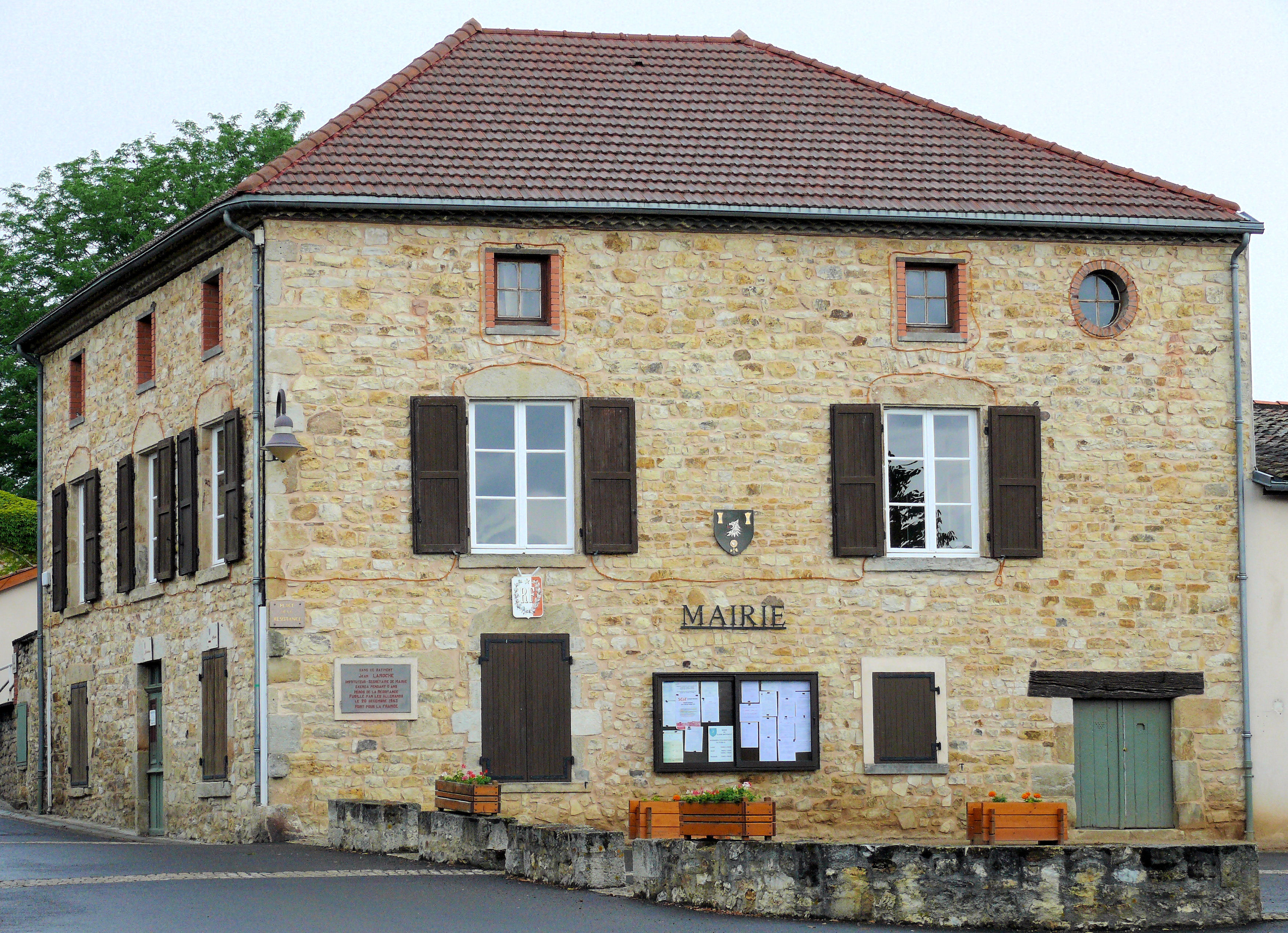
- The town hall in Glaine-Montaigut

- Coat of arms
- Location of Glaine-Montaigut
- Location within France Location within Auvergne-Rhône-Alpes
- Coordinates: 45°45′24″N 3°23′24″E
- Country: France
- Region: Auvergne-Rhône-Alpes
- Department: Puy-de-Dôme
- Arrondissement: Clermont-Ferrand
- Canton: Billom
- Intercommunality: Billom Communauté

Government
  - Mayor (2020–2026): Nathalie Vachias
- Area^{1}: 12.92 km^{2} (4.99 sq mi)
- Elevation: 365 m (1,198 ft)
- Highest elevation: 531 m (1,742 ft)
- Lowest elevation: 326 m (1,070 ft)
- Population (2023): 606
  - Density: 46.9/km^{2} (121/sq mi)
- Time zone: UTC+01:00 (CET)
  - Summer (DST): UTC+02:00 (CEST)
- INSEE/Postal code: 63168 /63160
- ^{1} French Land Register data, which excludes lakes, ponds, glaciers > 1 km^{2} (0.386 sq mi or 247 acres) and river estuaries.

Glaine-Montaigut (French pronunciation: [ɡlɛn mɔ̃tɛɡy]) is a commune in the Puy-de-Dôme department in Auvergne-Rhône-Alpes in central France.

== See also ==
- Communes of the Puy-de-Dôme department
