= Estandeuil =

- Commune
- Coat of arms
- Location of Estandeuil
- Location within France Location within Auvergne-Rhône-Alpes
- Coordinates: 45°40′50″N 3°26′36″E
- Country: France
- Region: Auvergne-Rhône-Alpes
- Department: Puy-de-Dôme
- Arrondissement: Clermont-Ferrand
- Canton: Billom
- Intercommunality: Billom Communauté

Government
  - Mayor (2026–32): Jean-Michel Travers
- Area^{1}: 9.59 km^{2} (3.70 sq mi)
- Elevation: 526 m (1,726 ft)
- Highest elevation: 626 m (2,054 ft)
- Lowest elevation: 452 m (1,483 ft)
- Population (2023): 512
  - Density: 53.4/km^{2} (138/sq mi)
- Time zone: UTC+01:00 (CET)
  - Summer (DST): UTC+02:00 (CEST)
- INSEE/Postal code: 63155 /63520
- ^{1} French Land Register data, which excludes lakes, ponds, glaciers > 1 km^{2} (0.386 sq mi or 247 acres) and river estuaries.

Estandeuil (French pronunciation: [ɛstɑ̃dœj]; Occitan: Estanduelh) is a commune in the Puy-de-Dôme department in Auvergne-Rhône-Alpes in central France.

== See also ==
- Communes of the Puy-de-Dôme department
