= Saint-Dier-d'Auvergne =

- Commune
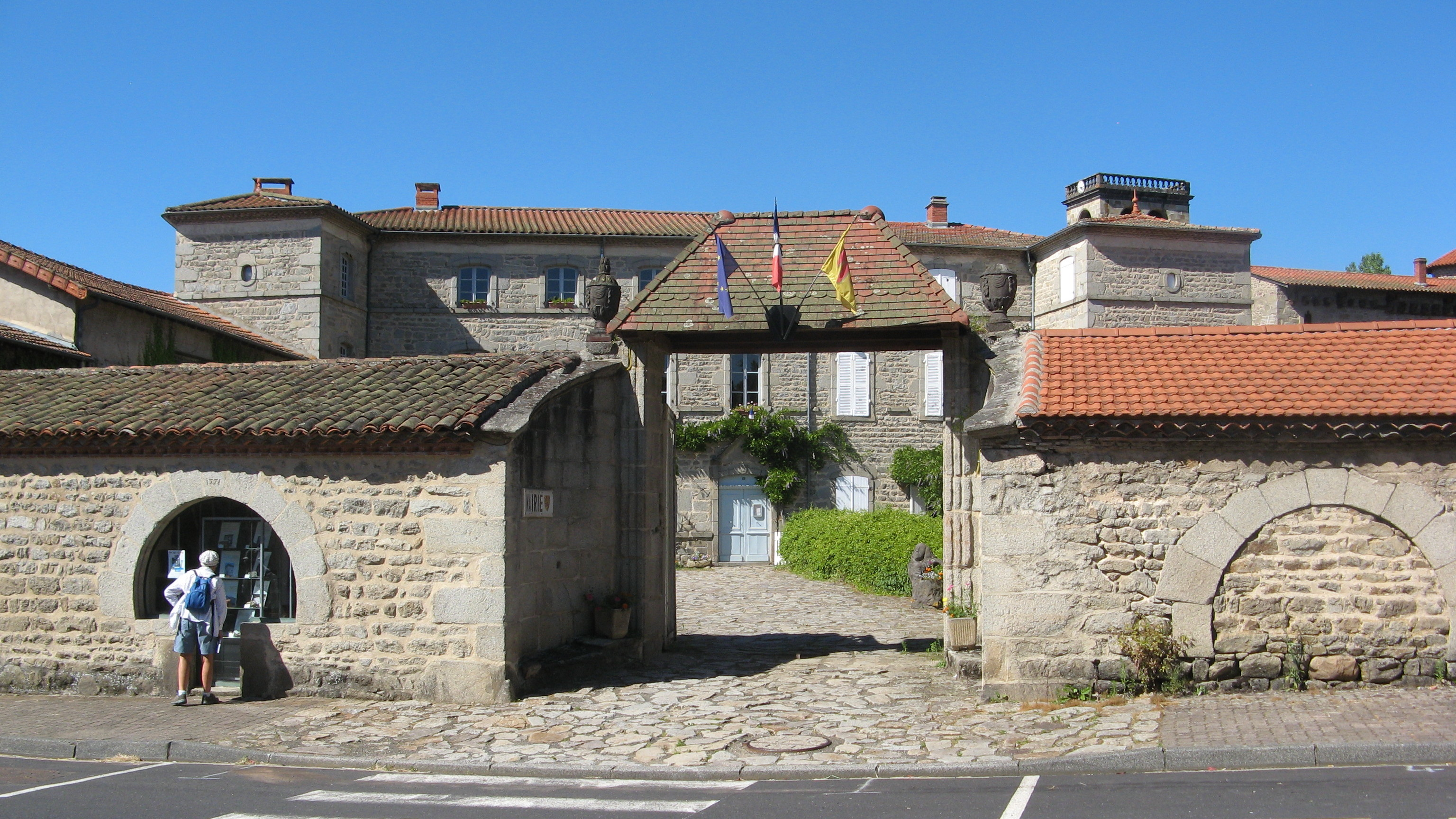
- The town hall in Saint-Dier-d'Auvergne

- Coat of arms
- Location of Saint-Dier-d'Auvergne
- Location within France Location within Auvergne-Rhône-Alpes
- Coordinates: 45°40′34″N 3°28′59″E
- Country: France
- Region: Auvergne-Rhône-Alpes
- Department: Puy-de-Dôme
- Arrondissement: Clermont-Ferrand
- Canton: Billom
- Intercommunality: Billom Communauté

Government
  - Mayor (2020–2026): Nathalie Sessa
- Area^{1}: 20.15 km^{2} (7.78 sq mi)
- Elevation: 445 m (1,460 ft)
- Highest elevation: 700 m (2,300 ft)
- Lowest elevation: 416 m (1,365 ft)
- Population (2023): 556
  - Density: 27.6/km^{2} (71.5/sq mi)
- Time zone: UTC+01:00 (CET)
  - Summer (DST): UTC+02:00 (CEST)
- INSEE/Postal code: 63334 /63520
- ^{1} French Land Register data, which excludes lakes, ponds, glaciers > 1 km^{2} (0.386 sq mi or 247 acres) and river estuaries.

Saint-Dier-d'Auvergne (French pronunciation: [sɛ̃ dje dovɛʁɲ]) is a small village-town in the Puy-de-Dôme department in Auvergne-Rhône-Alpes region in central France. The commune of Saint-Dier-d'Auvergne is part of the canton of Billom and of the arrondissement of Clermont-Ferrand.

== Geography ==
The altitude of the commune of Saint-Dier-d'Auvergne ranges between 416 and 700 meters. The area of the commune is 20.15 km^{2}. The nearest larger towns are Courpière (10 km to the northeast) and Billom (12 km to the northwest).

== Population and housing ==
As of 2023, the population of the commune was 556. As of 2019, there were 416 dwellings in the commune, of which 265 primary residences.

== Notable people ==
- Clotilde Dissard (1873–1919), journalist, feminist

== See also ==
- Communes of the Puy-de-Dôme department
