= Beauregard-l'Évêque =

- Commune
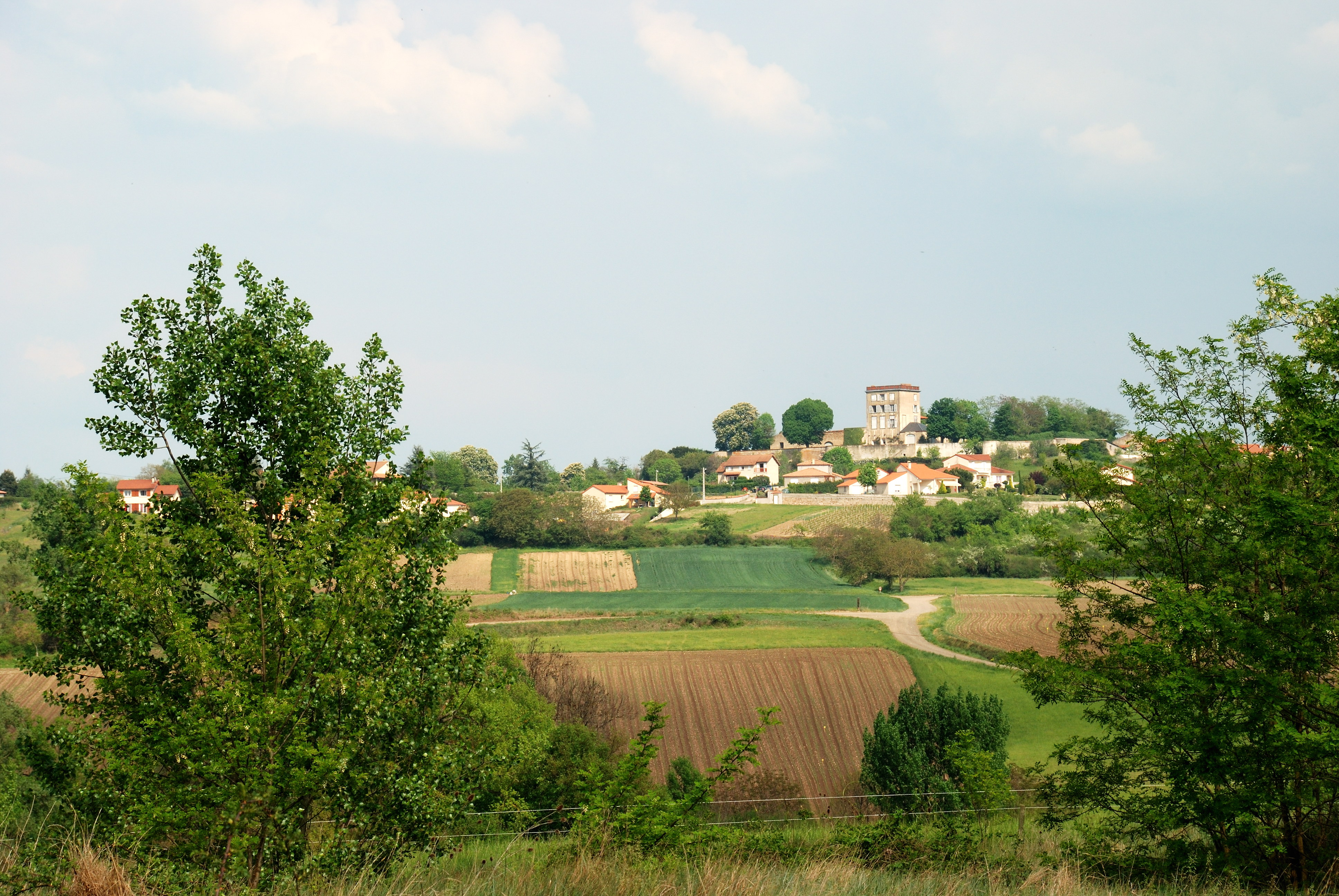
- General view of the village

- Coat of arms
- Location of Beauregard-l'Évêque
- Location within France Location within Auvergne-Rhône-Alpes
- Coordinates: 45°48′42″N 3°18′01″E
- Country: France
- Region: Auvergne-Rhône-Alpes
- Department: Puy-de-Dôme
- Arrondissement: Clermont-Ferrand
- Canton: Billom
- Intercommunality: Billom Communauté

Government
  - Mayor (2026–32): Patricia Bussiere
- Area^{1}: 12.02 km^{2} (4.64 sq mi)
- Elevation: 378 m (1,240 ft)
- Highest elevation: 390 m (1,280 ft)
- Lowest elevation: 295 m (968 ft)
- Population (2023): 1,586
  - Density: 131.9/km^{2} (341.7/sq mi)
- Time zone: UTC+01:00 (CET)
  - Summer (DST): UTC+02:00 (CEST)
- INSEE/Postal code: 63034 /63116
- ^{1} French Land Register data, which excludes lakes, ponds, glaciers > 1 km^{2} (0.386 sq mi or 247 acres) and river estuaries.

Beauregard-l'Évêque is a commune in the Puy-de-Dôme department in Auvergne-Rhône-Alpes in central France.

== Population ==
Historical population
Year	Pop.	±% p.a.
1968	654	—
1975	634	−0.44%
1982	773	+2.87%
1990	894	+1.83%
1999	1,158	+2.92%
2007	1,317	+1.62%
2012	1,333	+0.24%
2017	1,518	+2.63%
2023	1,586	+0.73%
Source: INSEE

== See also ==
- Communes of the Puy-de-Dôme department
