= Canton of Billom =

Coordinates: 45.72°N 3.34°E

The canton of Billom is an administrative division of the Puy-de-Dôme department, central France. Its borders were modified at the French canton reorganisation which came into effect in March 2015. Its seat is in Billom.

It consists of the following communes:

1. Beauregard-l'Évêque
2. Billom
3. Bongheat
4. Bouzel
5. Chas
6. Chauriat
7. Égliseneuve-près-Billom
8. Espirat
9. Estandeuil
10. Fayet-le-Château
11. Glaine-Montaigut
12. Isserteaux
13. Mauzun
14. Montmorin
15. Neuville
16. Reignat
17. Saint-Bonnet-lès-Allier
18. Saint-Dier-d'Auvergne
19. Saint-Jean-des-Ollières
20. Saint-Julien-de-Coppel
21. Trézioux
22. Vassel
23. Vertaizon
