= Saint-Jean-des-Ollières =

- Commune
- Location of Saint-Jean-des-Ollières
- Location within France Location within Auvergne-Rhône-Alpes
- Coordinates: 45°38′42″N 3°26′10″E
- Country: France
- Region: Auvergne-Rhône-Alpes
- Department: Puy-de-Dôme
- Arrondissement: Clermont-Ferrand
- Canton: Billom
- Intercommunality: Billom Communauté

Government
  - Mayor (2026–32): Karine Joncoux
- Area^{1}: 19.56 km^{2} (7.55 sq mi)
- Elevation: 660 m (2,170 ft)
- Highest elevation: 792 m (2,598 ft)
- Lowest elevation: 470 m (1,540 ft)
- Population (2023): 459
  - Density: 23.5/km^{2} (60.8/sq mi)
- Time zone: UTC+01:00 (CET)
  - Summer (DST): UTC+02:00 (CEST)
- INSEE/Postal code: 63365 /63520
- ^{1} French Land Register data, which excludes lakes, ponds, glaciers > 1 km^{2} (0.386 sq mi or 247 acres) and river estuaries.

Saint-Jean-des-Ollières (French pronunciation: [sɛ̃ ʒɑ̃ de.z‿ɔljɛʁ]; Auvergnat: Sant Joan de las Olèiras) is a commune in the Puy-de-Dôme department in Auvergne-Rhône-Alpes in central France.

== See also ==
- Communes of the Puy-de-Dôme department
