= Montmorin, Puy-de-Dôme =

Montmorin
- Commune
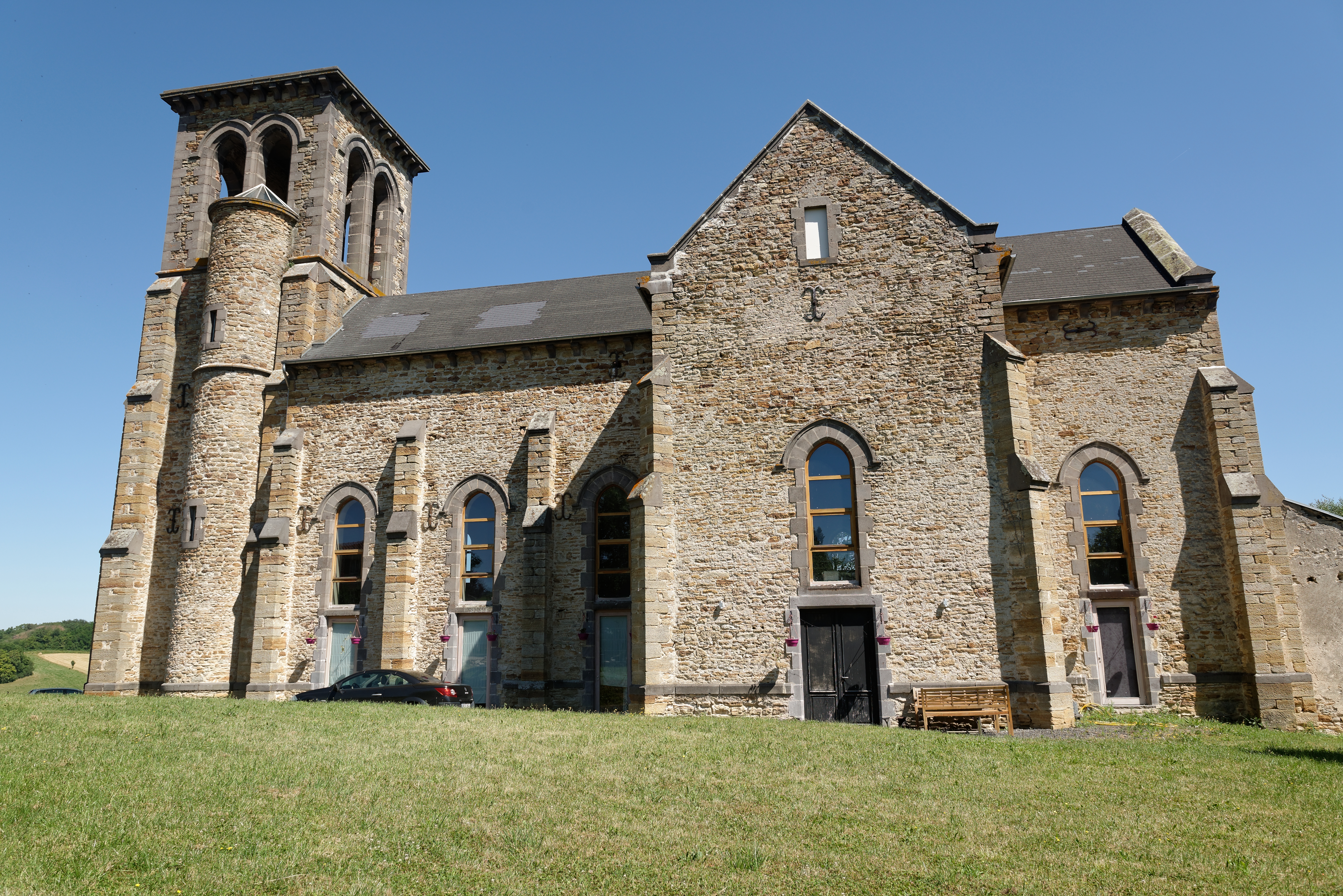
- The church in Montmorin

- Coat of arms
- Location of Montmorin
- Location within France Location within Auvergne-Rhône-Alpes
- Coordinates: 45°41′42″N 3°21′36″E
- Country: France
- Region: Auvergne-Rhône-Alpes
- Department: Puy-de-Dôme
- Arrondissement: Clermont-Ferrand
- Canton: Billom
- Intercommunality: Billom Communauté

Government
  - Mayor (2020–2026): Gérard Guillaume
- Area^{1}: 13.65 km^{2} (5.27 sq mi)
- Elevation: 630 m (2,070 ft)
- Highest elevation: 703 m (2,306 ft)
- Lowest elevation: 370 m (1,210 ft)
- Population (2023): 731
  - Density: 53.6/km^{2} (139/sq mi)
- Time zone: UTC+01:00 (CET)
  - Summer (DST): UTC+02:00 (CEST)
- INSEE/Postal code: 63239 /63160
- ^{1} French Land Register data, which excludes lakes, ponds, glaciers > 1 km^{2} (0.386 sq mi or 247 acres) and river estuaries.

Montmorin (French pronunciation: [mɔ̃mɔʁɛ̃]) is a commune in the Puy-de-Dôme department in Auvergne in central France.

== See also ==
- Communes of the Puy-de-Dôme department
