= Billom =

- Commune
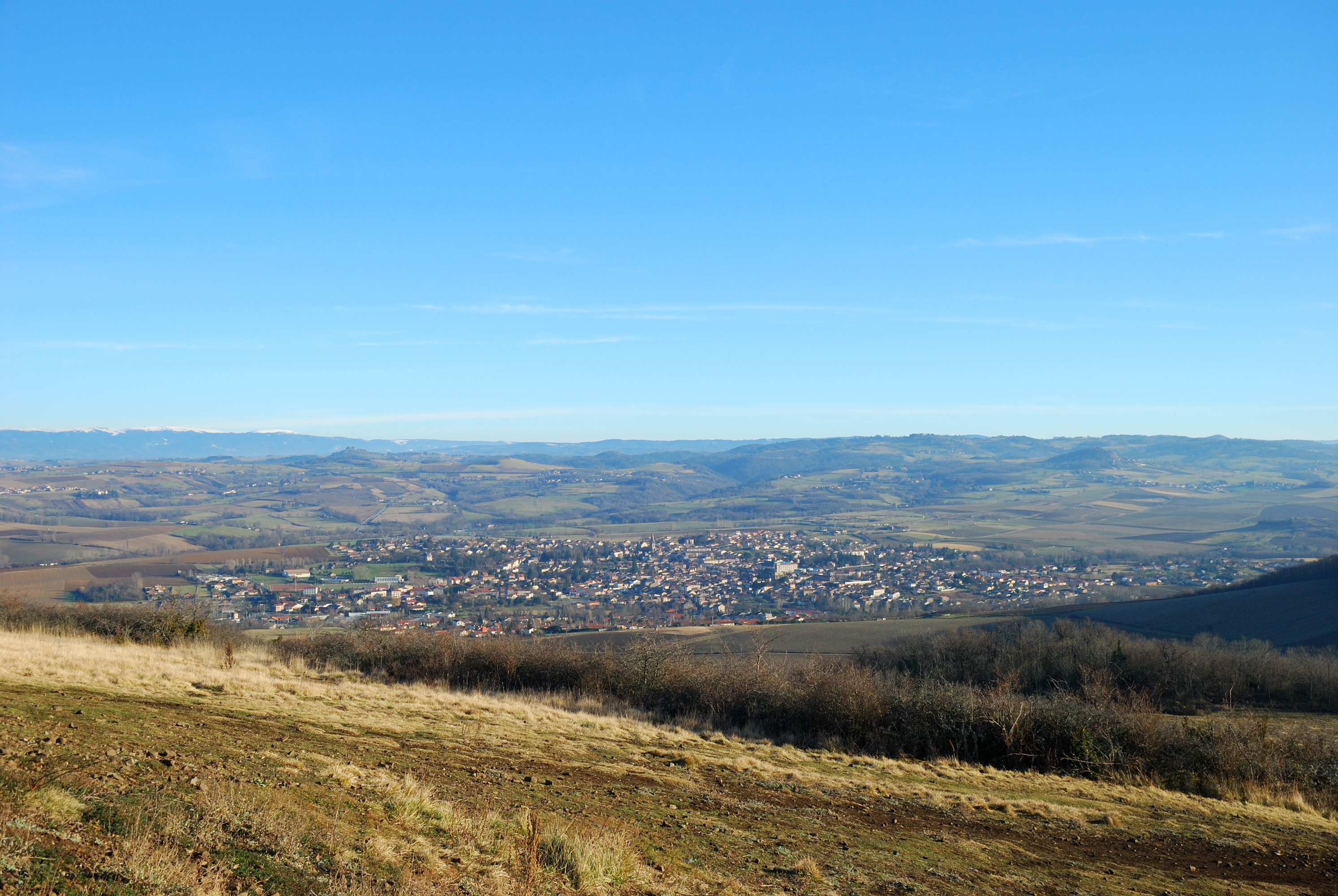
- A general view of Billom

- Coat of arms
- Location of Billom
- Location within France Location within Auvergne-Rhône-Alpes
- Coordinates: 45°43′11″N 3°20′18″E
- Country: France
- Region: Auvergne-Rhône-Alpes
- Department: Puy-de-Dôme
- Arrondissement: Clermont-Ferrand
- Canton: Billom
- Intercommunality: Billom Communauté

Government
  - Mayor (2020–2026): Jean-Michel Charlat
- Area^{1}: 16.96 km^{2} (6.55 sq mi)
- Highest elevation: 563 m (1,847 ft)
- Lowest elevation: 345 m (1,132 ft)
- Population (2023): 4,805
  - Density: 283.3/km^{2} (733.8/sq mi)
- Time zone: UTC+01:00 (CET)
  - Summer (DST): UTC+02:00 (CEST)
- INSEE/Postal code: 63040 /63160
- ^{1} French Land Register data, which excludes lakes, ponds, glaciers > 1 km^{2} (0.386 sq mi or 247 acres) and river estuaries.

Billom (French pronunciation: [bijɔ̃]; Auvergnat: Bilhom) is a commune in the Puy-de-Dôme department in the Auvergne-Rhône-Alpes region in central France.

== Population ==
Historical population
| Year | Pop. | ±% p.a. |
|---|---|---|
| 1968 | 3,704 | — |
| 1975 | 3,968 | +0.99% |
| 1982 | 4,092 | +0.44% |
| 1990 | 3,968 | −0.38% |
| 1999 | 4,246 | +0.76% |
| 2007 | 4,619 | +1.06% |
| 2012 | 4,739 | +0.51% |
| 2017 | 4,741 | +0.01% |
| 2023 | 4,805 | +0.22% |
Source: INSEE

== Notable natives ==
Billom was the birthplace of the philosopher Georges Bataille. It was also the birthplace of Cardinal Hugh Aycelin, OP, who was a 13th-century French Dominican theologian and philosopher, and who served as lector at the Studium Provinciale of Santa Sabina in Rome, this institution being the predecessor of the Pontifical University of Saint Thomas Aquinas (the "Angelicum").

== See also ==
- Communes of the Puy-de-Dôme department
