= Jimmy Wales =

Co-founder of Wikipedia (born 1966)

- Wales in 2026
- Born: Jimmy Donal Wales; August 8, 1966 (age 60); Huntsville, Alabama, U.S.
- Other name: Jimbo Wales
- Citizenship: United States; United Kingdom
- Education: Auburn University (BS); University of Alabama (MS)
- Occupations: Internet entrepreneur; webmaster; financial trader
- Known for: Co-founding Wikipedia
- Title: President of Fandom (2004–present); Chairman of the Wikimedia Foundation (2003–2006); Chair emeritus of the Wikimedia Foundation (2006–present)
- Spouses: Pamela Green (m. 1986; div. 1993); Christine Rohan (m. 1997; div. 2011); Kate Garvey (m. 2012)
- Children: 3
- Jimmy Wales's voice Recorded August 2014
- Website: jimmywales.com

Jimmy Donal "Jimbo" Wales (born August 8, 1966) is an American and British internet entrepreneur and former financial trader. He is best known for co-founding Wikipedia, a non-profit free encyclopedia, and Fandom (formerly Wikia), a for-profit wiki hosting service. He has also worked on Bomis, Nupedia, WikiTribune, and Trust Café (formerly WT Social).

Born in Huntsville, Alabama, Wales attended Randolph School and earned finance degrees from Auburn University and the University of Alabama. He worked as a financial options trader in Chicago during the 1990s before shifting his focus to the internet economy. While in graduate school, he was teaching at two universities, but left before completing a PhD to work in finance, later becoming chief research officer at Chicago Options Associates.

In 1996, Wales co-founded Bomis, which funded the free peer-reviewed encyclopedia Nupedia (2000–2003). On January 15, 2001, with Larry Sanger and others, he launched Wikipedia, which grew rapidly. Wales became its promoter and public face, though he has at times disputed Sanger's role, claiming sole founder status.

Wales has served on the Wikimedia Foundation board of trustees since its creation, holding its board-appointed "community founder" seat. He gives annual "State of the Wiki" addresses at Wikimania. In 2006, Time named him one of the 100 most influential people in the world for his role in creating Wikipedia.

== Early life and education ==
Jimmy Donal Wales was born in Huntsville, Alabama, on August 8, 1966. (Note: Sources vary on Wales' birth date. References to his birth date as August 7 are incorrect. This was due to a mismatch on his birth certificate, causing other official documents to be incorrect. Wales has since confirmed his birth date as August 8.) His father, Jimmy Don Wales, was a grocery store manager, while his mother, Doris Ann (née Dudley), and his grandmother, Erma, ran the House of Learning, a small private school in the tradition of the one-room schoolhouse, where Wales and his three siblings received their early education. As a child, Wales enjoyed reading. When he was three years old, his mother bought a World Book Encyclopedia from a door-to-door salesman. World Book sent out stickers for owners to paste on the pages to update the encyclopedia, and Wales used them on his copy, stating, "I joke that I started as a kid revising the encyclopedia by stickering the one my mother bought."

During an interview in 2005 with Brian Lamb, Wales described his childhood private school as a "Montessori-influenced philosophy of education", where he "spent lots of hours poring over the Britannica and World Book Encyclopedias". There were only four other children in Wales' grade, so the school combined the first- through fourth-grade students, and the fifth- through eighth-grade students. As an adult, Wales was sharply critical of the government's treatment of the school, citing the "constant interference and bureaucracy and very sort of snobby inspectors from the state" as a formative influence on his political philosophy.

After eighth grade, Wales attended Randolph School, a university-preparatory school in Huntsville, graduating at age 16. He said that the school was expensive for his family, but that "education was always a passion in my household ... you know, the very traditional approach to knowledge and learning and establishing that as a base for a good life." He received his bachelor's degree in finance from Auburn University in 1986. He began his Auburn education when he was 16 years old. He then entered the PhD finance program at the University of Alabama before leaving with a master's degree to enter the PhD finance program at Indiana University Bloomington. At the University of Alabama, he played Internet fantasy games and developed his interest in the web. He taught at both universities during his postgraduate studies but did not write the doctoral dissertation required for a PhD, something he ascribed to boredom.

== Career ==
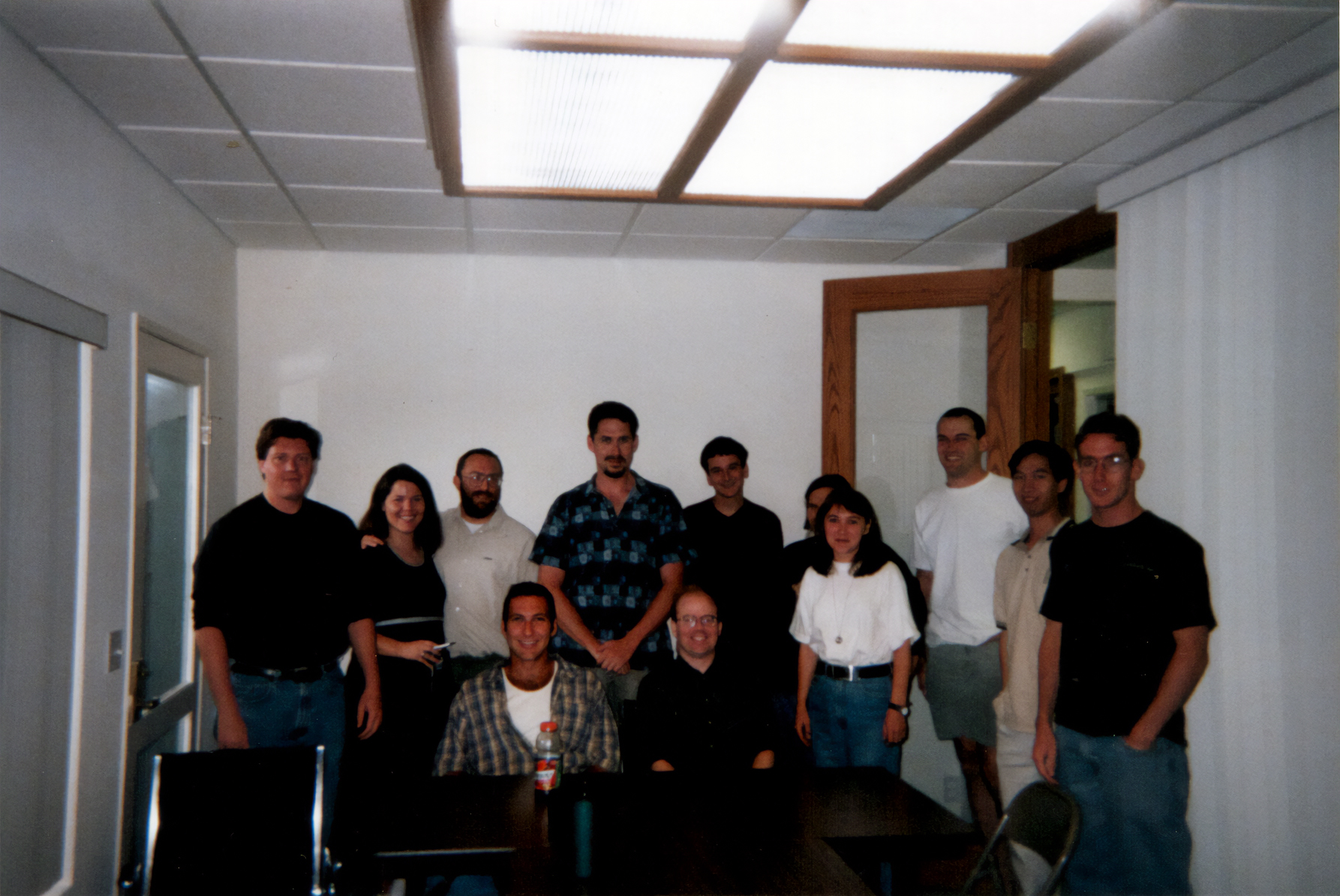
The staff of Wales' Internet company Bomis photographed in summer 2000. Wales is third from the left in the back row with Christine Rohan — at the time Christine Wales, his second wife.

In 1994, Wales took a job with Chicago Options Associates, a futures and options trading firm in Chicago, Illinois. Wales has described himself as having been addicted to the Internet from an early stage, writing computer code during his leisure time. During his studies in Alabama, he had become an obsessive player of multi-user dungeons (MUDs)—a type of virtual role-playing game—and thereby experienced the potential of computer networks to foster large-scale collaborative projects.

Inspired by the successful initial public offering of Netscape in 1995, and having accumulated capital through "speculating on interest-rate and foreign-currency fluctuations", Wales decided to leave the realm of financial trading and became an Internet entrepreneur. In 1996, he and two partners founded Bomis, a web portal featuring user-generated webrings and softcore pornography, with adult content being the most successful part of the Bomis venture. Wales described it as a "guy-oriented search engine" with a market similar to that of Maxim magazine; the Bomis venture did not ultimately turn out to be successful.

=== Lead-up to Wikipedia ===
Nupedia's logo

Though Bomis had at the time struggled to make money, it provided Wales with the funding to pursue his greater passion, an online encyclopedia. While moderating an online discussion group devoted to the philosophy of Objectivism in the early 1990s, Wales had encountered Larry Sanger, a skeptic of the philosophy. The two had engaged in detailed debate on the subject on Wales' list and then on Sanger's, eventually meeting offline to continue the debate and becoming friends.

Years later, after deciding to pursue his encyclopedia project and seeking a credentialed academic to lead it, Wales hired Sanger—who at that time was a doctoral student in philosophy at Ohio State University—to be its editor-in-chief, and in March 2000, Nupedia ("the free encyclopedia"), a peer-reviewed, open-content encyclopedia, was launched. The intent behind Nupedia was to have expert-written entries on a variety of topics and to sell advertising alongside the entries to make a profit. The project was characterized by an extensive peer-review process designed to make its articles of a quality comparable to that of professional encyclopedias.

The idea was to have thousands of volunteers writing articles for an online encyclopedia in all languages. Initially, we found ourselves organizing the work in a very top-down, structured, academic, old-fashioned way. It was no fun for the volunteer writers because we had a lot of academic peer review committees who would criticize articles and give feedback. It was like handing in an essay at grad school, and basically intimidating to participate in.

— Jimmy Wales on the Nupedia project New Scientist, January 31, 2007

In an October 2009 speech, Wales recollected attempting to write a Nupedia article on Nobel Prize-winning economist Robert C. Merton, but being too intimidated to submit his first draft to the prestigious finance professors who were to peer review it. Wales characterized this as the moment he realized that the Nupedia model was not going to work.

In January 2001, Sanger was introduced to the concept of a wiki by extreme programming enthusiast Ben Kovitz after explaining to Kovitz the slow pace of growth Nupedia endured as a result of its onerous submission process. Kovitz suggested that adopting the wiki model would allow editors to contribute simultaneously and incrementally throughout the project, thus breaking Nupedia's bottleneck. Sanger was excited about the idea, and after he proposed it to Wales, they created the first Nupedia wiki on January 10, 2001.

The wiki was initially intended as a collaborative project for the public to write articles that would then be reviewed for publication by Nupedia's expert volunteers. The majority of Nupedia's experts, however, wanted nothing to do with this project, fearing that mixing amateur content with professionally researched and edited material would compromise the integrity of Nupedia's information and damage the credibility of the encyclopedia. Despite this, the wiki project, dubbed "Wikipedia", went live at a separate domain five days after its creation.

=== Wikipedia ===
External videos
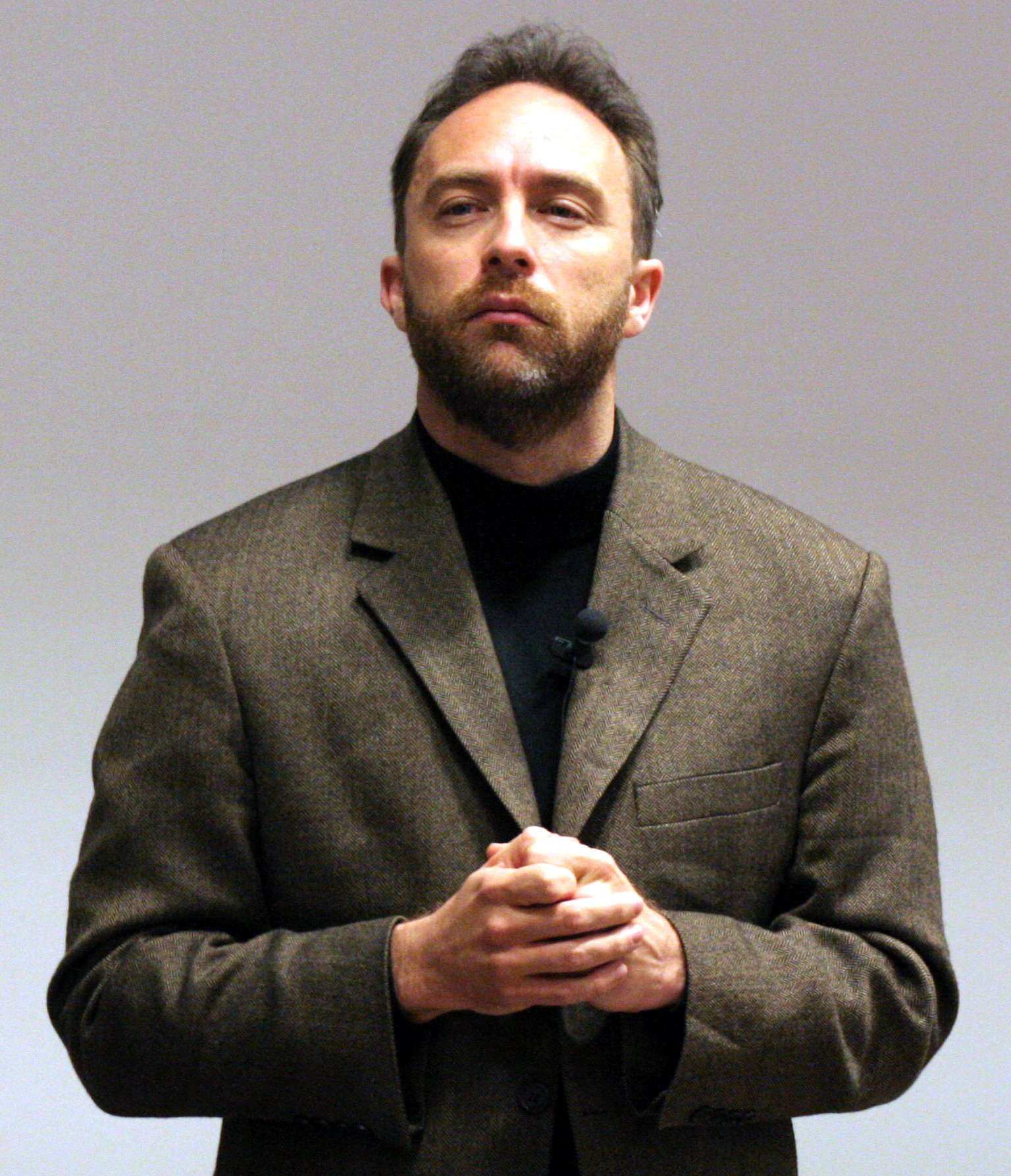
- Jimmy Wales: The birth of Wikipedia, TED, 2005
- Q&A interview with Jimmy Wales, C-SPAN, 2005
- Lecture Jimmy Wales: Understanding failure as a route to success, Maastricht University, 2015
- Interview with Wales, Lex Fridman Podcast, 2023
- Interview with Wikipedia co-founder Jimmy Wales at Wikimania 2025, Nairobi, Kenya, Rtv, 2025

Originally, Bomis planned to make Wikipedia profitable. Sanger initially saw Wikipedia primarily as a tool to aid Nupedia development. Wales feared that, at worst, it might produce "complete rubbish". To the surprise of Sanger and Wales, within a few days of launching, the number of articles on Wikipedia had outgrown that of Nupedia, and a small collective of editors had formed. It was Jimmy Wales, along with other people, who came up with the broader idea of an open-source, collaborative encyclopedia that would accept contributions from ordinary people. Initially, neither Sanger nor Wales knew what to expect from the Wikipedia initiative. Many of the early contributors to the site were familiar with the model of the free culture movement, and, like Wales, many of them sympathized with the open-source movement.

Wales has said that he was initially so worried about the concept of open editing, where anyone can edit the encyclopedia, that he would wake at night to monitor what was being added. Nonetheless, the cadre of early editors helped create a robust, self-regulating community that has proven conducive to the growth of the project. In a talk at SXSW in 2016, he recalled that he wrote the first words on Wikipedia: "Hello world", a phrase computer programmers often use to test new software.

Sanger developed Wikipedia in its early phase and guided the project. The broader idea he originally ascribes to other people, remarking in a 2005 memoir for Slashdot that "the idea of an open-source, collaborative encyclopedia, open to contribution by ordinary people, was entirely Jimmy's, not mine, and the funding was entirely by Bomis. Of course, other people had had the idea", adding, "the actual development of this encyclopedia was the task he gave me to work on."

Sanger worked on and promoted both the Nupedia and Wikipedia projects until Bomis discontinued funding for his position in February 2002; Sanger resigned as editor-in-chief of Nupedia and as "chief organizer" of Wikipedia on March 1 of that year. Early on, Bomis supplied the financial backing for Wikipedia, and entertained the notion of placing advertisements on Wikipedia before costs were reduced with Sanger's departure and plans for a non-profit foundation were advanced instead.

==== Co-founder status dispute ====
Wikipedia founders Wales and Larry Sanger both in 2026

Wales has said that he is the sole founder of Wikipedia, and has publicly disputed Sanger's designation as a co-founder. Sanger and Wales were identified as co-founders as early as September 2001 by The New York Times, and both were described as founders in Wikipedia's first press release in January 2002. In August of that year, Wales identified himself as "co-founder" of Wikipedia. Sanger assembled on his personal webpage an assortment of links that appear to confirm the status of he and Wales as co-founders.

In February 2006, Wales was quoted by The Boston Globe as calling Sanger's statements "preposterous", and in April 2009 Wales called the founder debate "silly". In 2013, Wales told The New York Times that the dispute is "the dumbest controversy in the history of the world". In November 2025, Wales appeared on the podcast Jung & Naiv for an interview with the German journalist Tilo Jung. Wales stood up and left after less than a minute, calling Jung's questions about his founder status "stupid".

In late 2005, Wales edited his biographical entry on the English Wikipedia. Writer Rogers Cadenhead drew attention to logs showing that in his edits to the page, Wales had removed references to Sanger as the co-founder of Wikipedia. Sanger commented that "having seen edits like this, it does seem that Jimmy is attempting to rewrite history. But this is a futile process because, in our brave new world of transparent activity and maximum communication, the truth will out." Wales was also observed to have modified references to Bomis in a way that was characterized as downplaying the sexual nature of some of his former company's products. Though Wales argued that his modifications were solely intended to improve the accuracy of the content, he apologized for editing his biography, a practice generally discouraged on Wikipedia.

==== Role ====
In a 2004 interview with Slashdot, Wales outlined his vision for Wikipedia: "Imagine a world in which every single person on the planet is given free access to the sum of all human knowledge. That's what we're doing." Although his formal designation is board member and chairman emeritus of the Wikimedia Foundation, Wales' social capital within the Wikipedia community has accorded him a status that has been characterized as benevolent dictator, constitutional monarch and spiritual leader. In two interviews with The Guardian in 2014, Wales elaborated on his role on Wikipedia. In the first interview, he said that while he "has always rejected" the term "benevolent dictator", he does refer to himself as the "constitutional monarch". In the second, he elaborated on his "constitutional monarch" designation, saying that, like Queen of the United Kingdom Elizabeth II, he has no real power. He was also the closest the project had to a spokesperson in its early years. The growth and prominence of Wikipedia made Wales an Internet celebrity. Although he had never traveled outside North America before the site's founding, his participation in the Wikipedia project has seen him flying internationally on a near-constant basis as its public face.

When Larry Sanger left Wikipedia, Wales' approach was different from Sanger's in that he was fairly hands-off. Despite involvement in other projects, Wales has denied intending to reduce his role within Wikipedia, telling The New York Times in 2008 that "Dialing down is not an option for me ... Not to be too dramatic about it, but, 'to create and distribute a free encyclopedia of the highest possible quality to every single person on the planet in their own language,' that's who I am. That's what I am doing. That's my life goal." In May 2010, the BBC reported that Wales had relinquished many of his technical privileges on Wikimedia Commons, a Wikipedia sister project that hosts much of its multimedia content. This came after criticism by the project's volunteer community, who considered Wales to have taken a hasty and undemocratic approach to deleting sexually explicit images he believed to "appeal solely to prurient interests".

=== Wikimedia Foundation ===
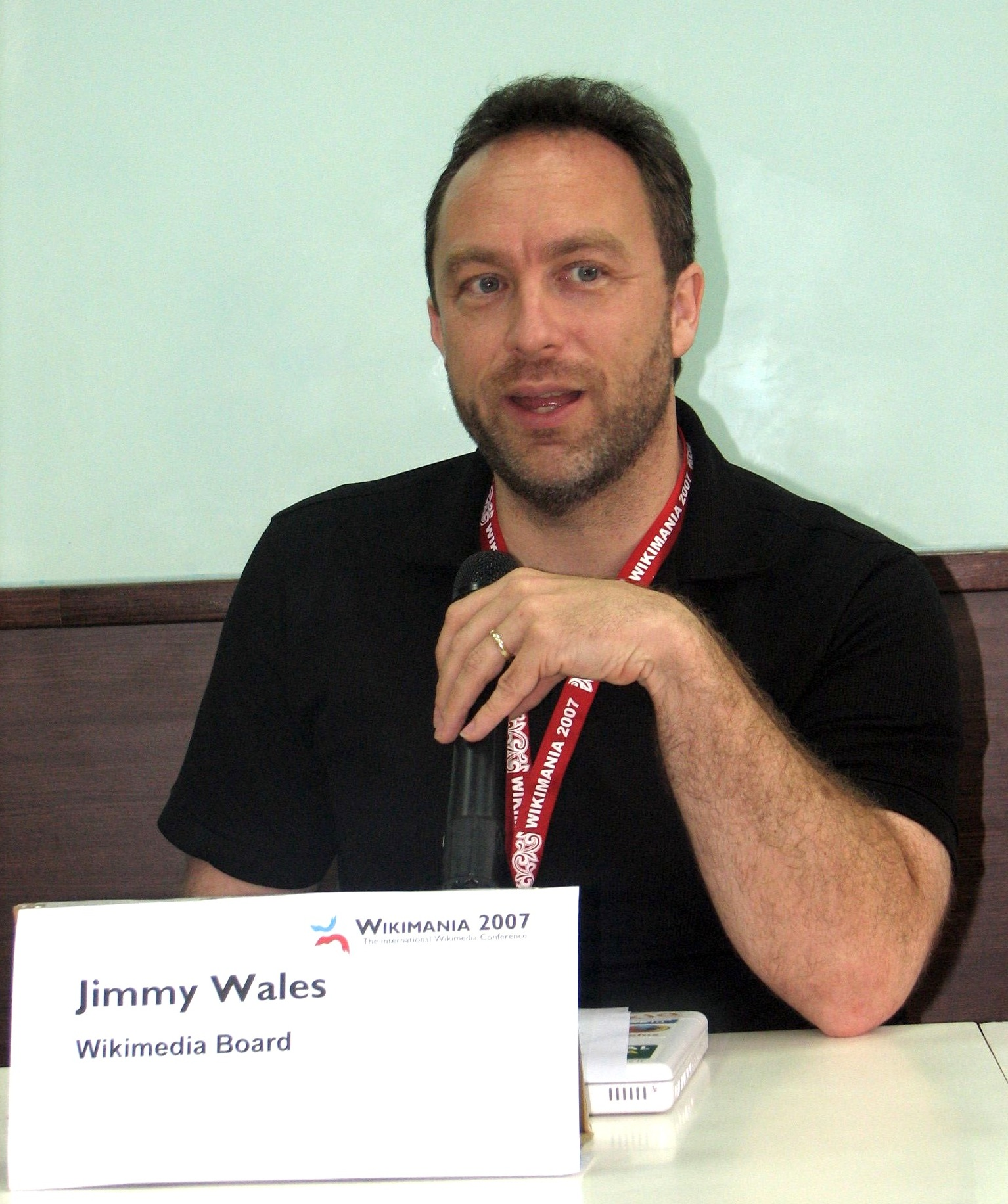
Wales appearing as a member of the Wikimedia Foundation Board of Trustees at Wikimania 2007

In mid-2003, Wales set up the Wikimedia Foundation (WMF), a non-profit organization founded in St. Petersburg, Florida, and later headquartered in San Francisco, California. All Wikipedia intellectual property rights and domain names were moved to the new foundation, whose purpose is to support the encyclopedia and its sister projects. Wales has been a member of the Wikimedia Foundation's Board of Trustees since it was formed and was its official chairman from 2003 through 2006. Since 2006 he has been accorded the honorary title of chairman emeritus and holds the board-appointed "community founder's seat" that was installed in 2008.

His work for the foundation, including his appearances to promote it at computer and educational conferences, has always been unpaid. Wales has often joked that donating Wikipedia to the foundation was both the "dumbest and the smartest" thing he had done. On one hand, he estimated that Wikipedia was worth US$3 billion but on the other hand, he weighed his belief that the donation made its success possible. In 2020, Wales said that "I view my role as being very much like the modern monarch of the UK: no real power, but the right to be consulted, the right to encourage, and the right to warn."

Wales' association with the foundation has led to controversy. In March 2008, Wales was accused by former Wikimedia Foundation employee Danny Wool of misusing the foundation's funds for recreational purposes. Wool also stated that Wales had his Wikimedia credit card taken away in part because of his spending habits, a statement Wales denied. Then-chairperson of the foundation Florence Devouard and former foundation interim Executive Director Brad Patrick denied any wrongdoing by Wales or the foundation, saying that Wales accounted for every expense and that, for items for which he lacked receipts, he paid out of his pocket; in private, Devouard upbraided Wales for "constantly trying to rewrite the past".

In early 2016, Wikipedia editors perceived the WMF's Knowledge Engine project as a conflict of interest for Wales, whose business Wikia might benefit from having the WMF spend a lot of money on research in respect to search. Wikia attempted to develop a search engine but it was closed in 2009.

=== Wikia and later pursuits ===
In 2004, Wales and then-fellow member of the WMF Board of Trustees Angela Beesley founded the for-profit company Wikia. Wikia is a wiki farm—a collection of individual wikis on different subjects, all hosted on the same website. It hosts some of the largest wikis outside Wikipedia, including Memory Alpha (devoted to Star Trek) and Wookieepedia (Star Wars). Another service offered by Wikia was Wikia Search, an open source search engine intended to challenge Google and introduce transparency and public dialogue about how it is created into the search engine's operations, but the project was abandoned in March 2009.

Wales stepped down as Wikia CEO to be replaced by angel investor Gil Penchina, a former vice president and general manager at eBay, on June 5, 2006. Penchina declared Wikia to have reached profitability in September 2009. In addition to his role at Wikia, Wales is a public speaker represented by the Harry Walker Agency. He has also participated in a celebrity endorsement campaign for the Swiss watchmaker Maurice Lacroix.

On November 4, 2011, Wales delivered an hour-long address at The Sage Gateshead in the United Kingdom to launch the 2011 Free Thinking Festival on BBC Radio Three. His speech, which was entitled "The Future of the Internet", was largely devoted to Wikipedia. Twenty days later, on November 24, Wales appeared on the British topical debate television program Question Time.

In May 2012, it was reported that Wales was advising the UK government on how to make taxpayer-funded academic research available on the internet at no cost. His role reportedly involved working as "an unpaid advisor on crowdsourcing and opening up policymaking", and advising the Department of Business, Innovation and Skills and the UK research councils on distributing research.

In January 2014, it was announced that Wales had joined The People's Operator as co-chair of the mobile phone network. On March 21, 2014, Wales spoke on a panel at a Clinton Global Initiative University conference held at Arizona State University, along with John McCain, Saudi Arabian women's rights activist Manal al-Sharif and Harvard University student Shree Bose. The topic of discussion was "the age of participation" and the ability of an increasingly large number of citizens to "express their own opinions, pursue their own educations, and launch their own enterprises." Wales exhorted young people to use social media to try to bring about societal change, and compared government suppression of the Internet to a human rights violation.

On May 26, 2014, Google appointed Wales to serve on a seven-member committee on privacy in response to Google v. Gonzalez, which led to Google's being inundated with requests to remove websites from their search results. Wales said he wanted the committee to be viewed as "a blue-ribbon panel" by lawmakers and for the committee to advise the lawmakers as well as Google.

In 2017, Wales announced that he was launching an online publication called WikiTribune, to fight fake news through a combination of professional journalists and volunteer contributors. Wales described it as "news by the people and for the people", and that it will be the "first time that professional journalists and citizen journalists will work side-by-side as equals writing stories as they happen, editing them live as they develop, and at all times backed by a community checking and rechecking all facts". In October 2019, Wales launched an ad-free social network, WT Social.

The Jimmy Wales Foundation for Freedom of Expression is a UK-based charity established by Wales to fight against human rights violations in the field of freedom of expression. Wales founded the charity after receiving a prize from the leader of Dubai, which he felt he could not accept given the strict censorship laws there, but claims he was not allowed to give back. As of 2016, the charity's CEO is Orit Kopel.

== Political views ==
=== Personal philosophy ===
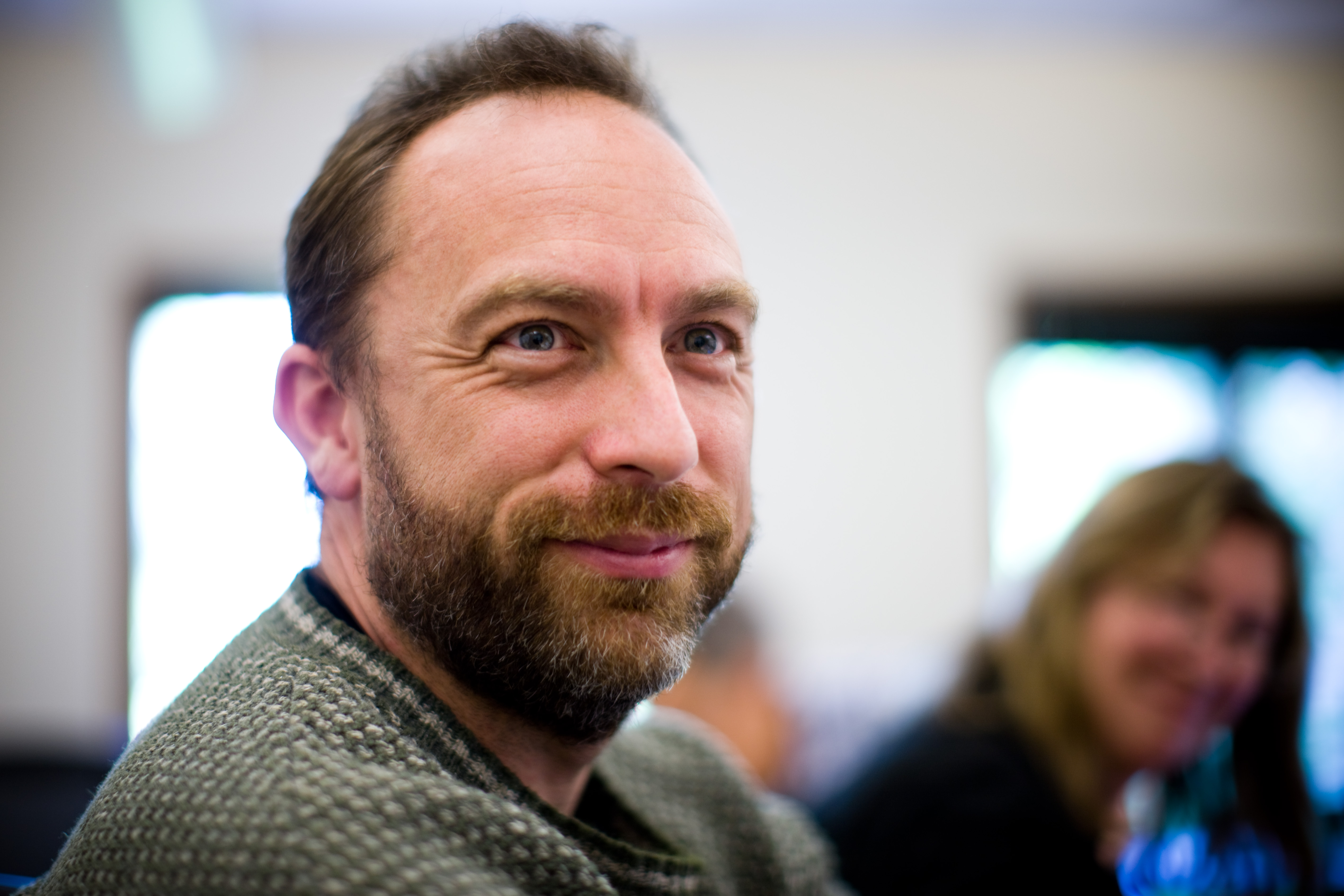
Wales at a Creative Commons board meeting in June 2008

Wales has previously referred to himself as an Objectivist, referring to the philosophy of writer Ayn Rand in the mid-20th century that emphasizes reason, individualism, and capitalism. Wales first encountered the philosophy through reading Rand's novel The Fountainhead during his undergraduate period and, in 1992, founded an electronic mailing list devoted to "Moderated Discussion of Objectivist Philosophy". Though he has stated that the philosophy "colors everything I do and think", he has said, "I think I do a better job—than a lot of people who self-identify as Objectivists—of not pushing my point of view on other people."

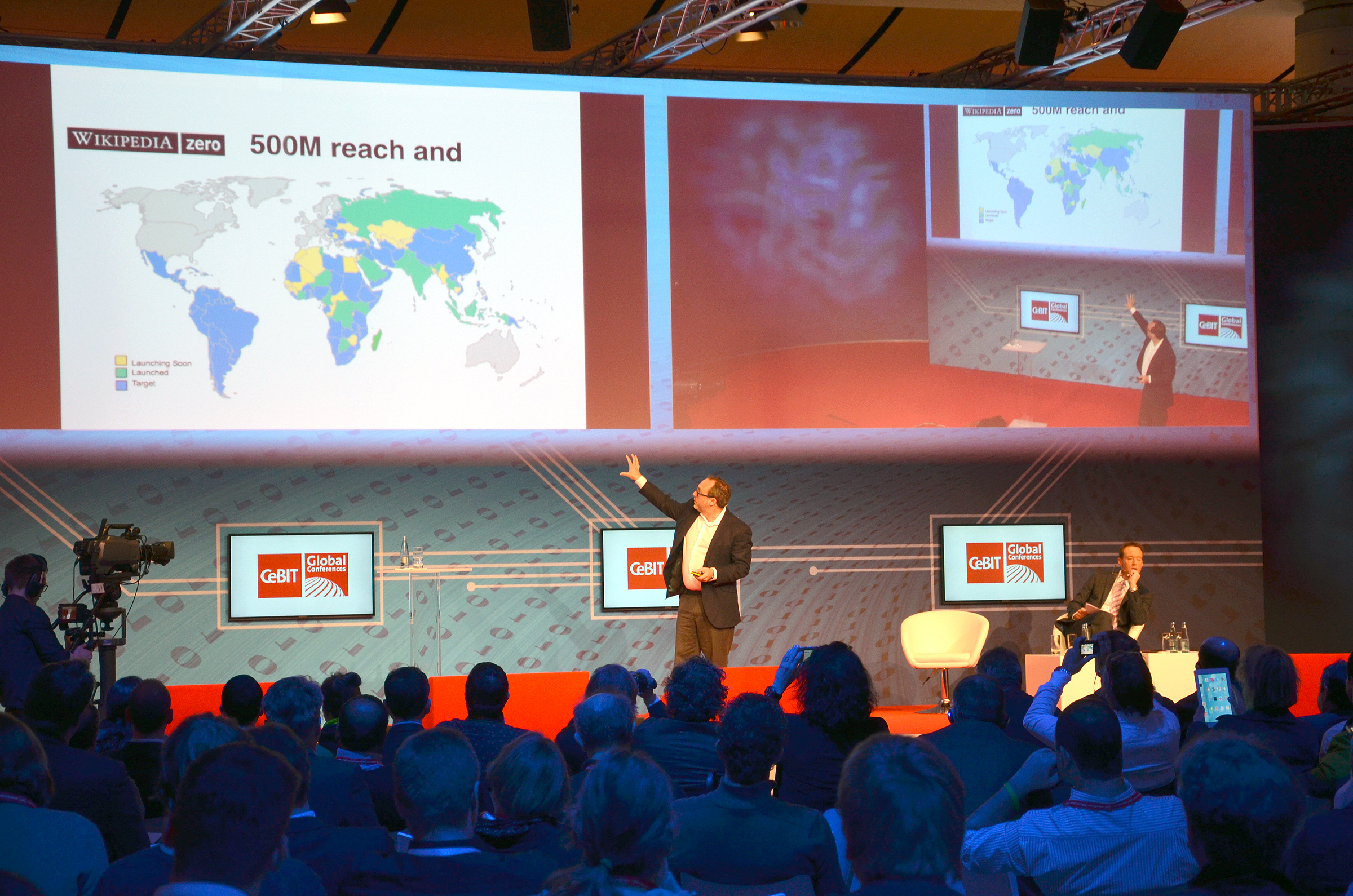
Jimmy Wales 2014 on CeBIT Global Conferences, Wikipedia Zero

When asked by Brian Lamb about Rand's influence on him in his appearance on C-SPAN's Q&A in September 2005, Wales cited integrity and "the virtue of independence" as personally important. When asked if he could trace "the Ayn Rand connection" to a personal political philosophy at the time of the interview, Wales labeled himself a libertarian, qualifying his remark by referring to the Libertarian Party as "lunatics", and citing "freedom, liberty, basically individual rights, that idea of dealing with other people in a manner that is not initiating force against them" as his guiding principles. In a 2014 tweet, he expressed support for open borders.

An interview with Wales served as the cover feature of the June 2007 issue of the libertarian magazine Reason. In that profile, he described his political views as "center-right". In a 2011 interview with The Independent, he expressed sympathy with the Occupy Wall Street and Occupy London protesters, saying, "You don't have to be a socialist to say it's not right to take money from everybody and give it to a few rich people. That's not free enterprise." Dan Hodges in The Daily Telegraph has described Wales as a "Labour sympathizer". In 2015, Wales offered to help Ed Miliband with the Labour Party's social media strategy, but Miliband declined the offer.

In 2015, Wales signed up as the committee chair for Democrat Lawrence Lessig's 2016 presidential campaign. In 2016, Wales and eleven other business leaders signed an open letter to American voters urging them not to vote for Donald Trump in that year's presidential election. In May 2017, Wales said on Quora that he is a centrist and a gradualist, and believes "that slow step-by-step change is better and more sustainable and allows us to test new things with a minimum of difficult disruption in society." In May 2022, Wales said that he did not identify with any particular political label. In May 2024, in the run-up to the 2024 United Kingdom general election, he was a joint signatory of a public letter of support for the UK Labour Party.

=== Development and management of Wikipedia ===
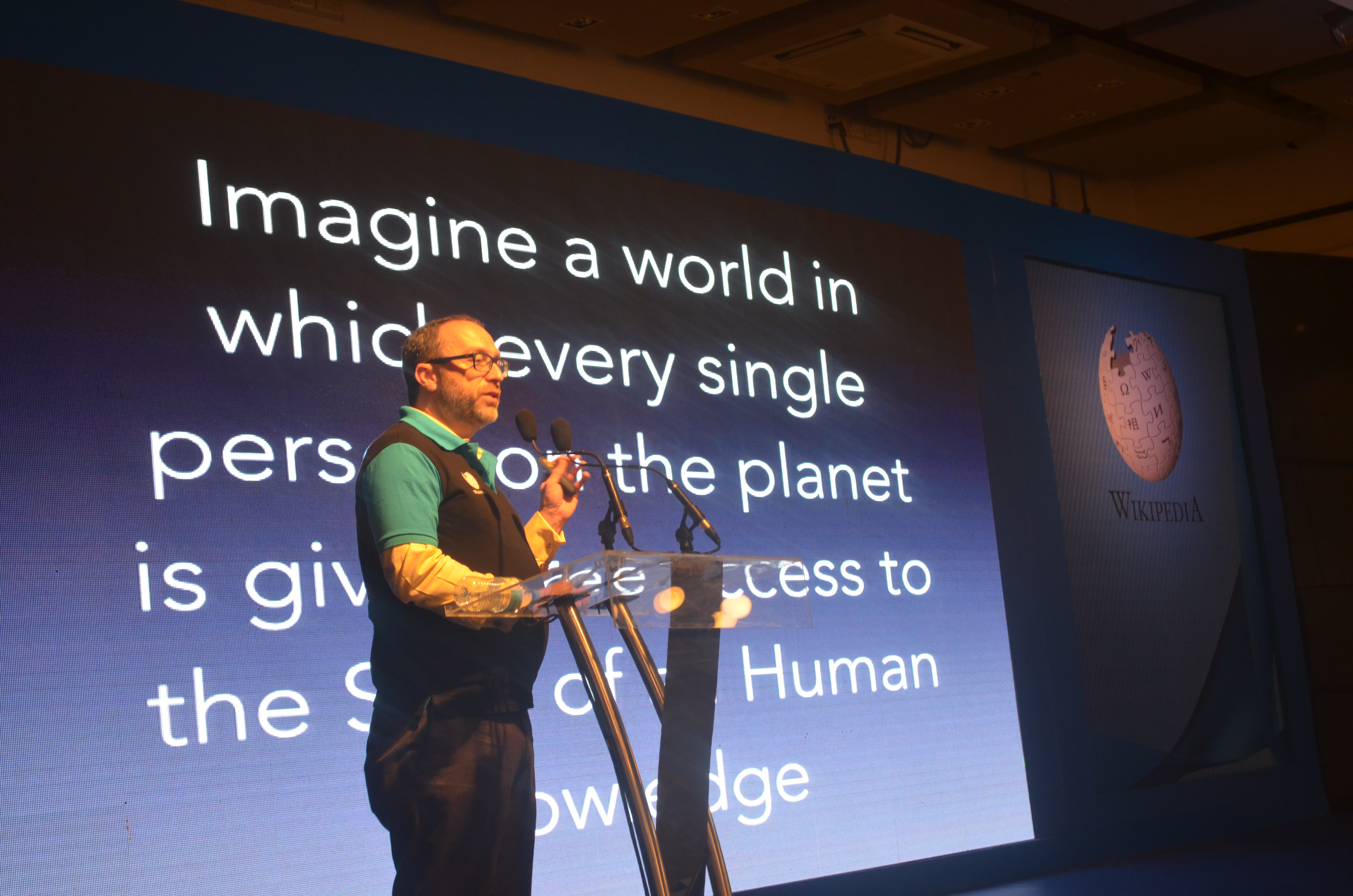
Wales at the tenth-anniversary celebration of the Bengali Wikipedia

Wales has cited Austrian School economist Friedrich Hayek's essay, "The Use of Knowledge in Society", which he read as an undergraduate, as "central" to his thinking about "how to manage the Wikipedia project". Hayek argued that information is decentralized—that each individual only knows a small fraction of what is known collectively—and that as a result, decisions are best made by those with local knowledge, rather than by a central authority. Wales reconsidered Hayek's essay in the 1990s while reading about the open source movement, which advocated for the collective development and free distribution of software. He was particularly moved by "The Cathedral and the Bazaar", an essay which was later adapted into a book of the same name, by one of the founders of the movement, Eric S. Raymond, as it "opened [his] eyes to the possibilities of mass collaboration."

From his background in finance, and working as a futures and options trader, Wales developed an interest in game theory and the effect of incentives on human collaborative activity. He identifies this fascination as a significant basis for his developmental work on the Wikipedia project. He has rejected the notion that his role in promoting Wikipedia is altruistic, which he defines as "sacrificing your own values for others", and he states that the idea that "participating in a benevolent effort to share information is somehow destroying your own values makes no sense to me".

=== European Court of Justice ruling ===
On May 14, 2014, Wales strongly reacted to the European Court of Justice (ECJ)'s ruling on the right of individuals to request the removal of information from Google's search results. He stated to the BBC that the ruling was "one of the most wide-sweeping internet censorship rulings that I've ever seen". In early June 2014, the TechCrunch media outlet interviewed Wales on the subject, as he had been invited by Google to join an advisory committee that the corporation had formed as an addition to the formal process that the ECJ requested from Google to manage such requests.

The May 2014 ECJ ruling required swift action from Google to implement a process that allowed people to directly contact the corporation about the removal of information that they believe is outdated or irrelevant. Google's Larry Page stated that 30 percent of requests received by Google since the ruling was made were categorized as "other". Wales explained in email responses that he was contacted by Google on May 28, 2014, and "The remit of the committee is to hold public hearings and issue recommendations—not just to Google but to legislators and the public." When asked about his view on the ECJ's "right to be forgotten" ruling, Wales replied:

I think the decision will have no impact on people's right to privacy, because I don't regard truthful information in court records published by court order in a newspaper to be private information. If anything, the decision is likely to simply muddle the interesting philosophical questions and make it more difficult to make real progress on privacy issues. In the case of truthful, non-defamatory information obtained legally, I think there is no possibility of any defensible "right" to censor what other people are saying. It is important to avoid language like "data" because we aren't talking about "data"—we are talking about the suppression of knowledge.

Wales then provided further explanation, drawing a comparison with Wikipedia: "You do not have a right to use the law to prevent Wikipedia editors from writing truthful information, nor do you have a right to use the law to prevent Google from publishing truthful information." Wales concluded with an indication of his ideal outcome: "A part of the outcome should be the very strong implementation of a right to free speech in Europe—essentially the language of the First Amendment in the U.S."

=== Israel ===
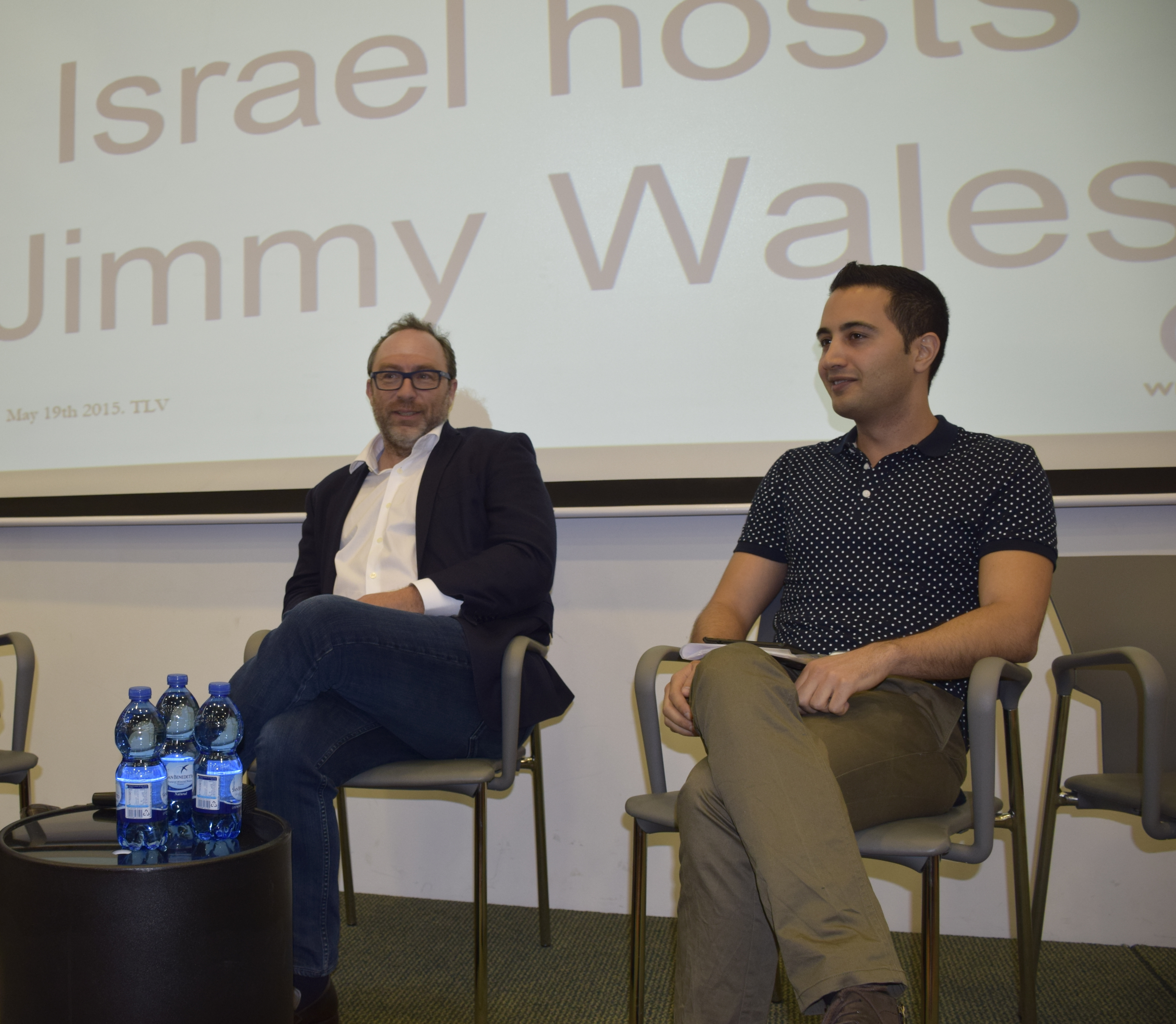
Wales at a Wikimedia Israel meeting, in 2015

Wales has visited Israel over ten times. Concerning claims that Israel engages in apartheid against Palestinians, Wales remarked, "I'm a strong supporter of Israel, so I don't listen to those critics," in a 2015 interview with the Jewish Telegraphic Agency. That year, he was awarded one of the Dan David Prizes, an international award of $1 million given yearly at Tel Aviv University. 10 percent of the prize goes to doctoral students. Wales was chosen for spearheading what the prize committee called the "information revolution".

In 2018, the pro-Palestinian publication Mondoweiss ran an article by Philip Weiss describing Wales as appearing to side with Israel due to a social media post condemning British politician Jeremy Corbyn for being silent about Hamas rocket attacks on Israel, missing an opportunity to immunize himself against charges of antisemitism. Wales responded to Mondoweiss saying the article was "false and deeply offensive to me" and demanded that the article be retracted, saying that he did not support the Israeli attacks. He further went on to call Hamas a "terrorist organization".

In November 2025, Wales criticized the English Wikipedia article on the Gaza genocide via its talk page. He argued that the article's assertion that Israel is committing genocide violated Wikipedia's policy to maintain a neutral point of view, stating that the article "is a particularly egregious example" of not maintaining neutrality. His criticism of the Gaza genocide page was countered by other Wikipedia editors, who argued that he was dismissing assessments by organizations they regarded as impartial.

=== 2025 culture wars ===
In October 2025, Wales gave an interview to The New York Times on the "culture wars", or the "speech wars", a series of attempts by Republican congressmen and the Trump White House to investigate and scrutinize activities and suspected "organizational bias" on Wikipedia.

In his interview he discussed several issues as they relate to Wikipedia saying: "Wikipedia isn't as good as I want it to be. And that's part of why people do have a certain amount of trust for us, because we try to be really transparent" and "we're designing everything for the long haul, and the only way we can last that long is not by pandering to this raging mob of the moment but by maintaining our values, maintaining our trustworthiness. We're just going to do our thing, and we're going to do it as well as we can."

=== Other issues ===
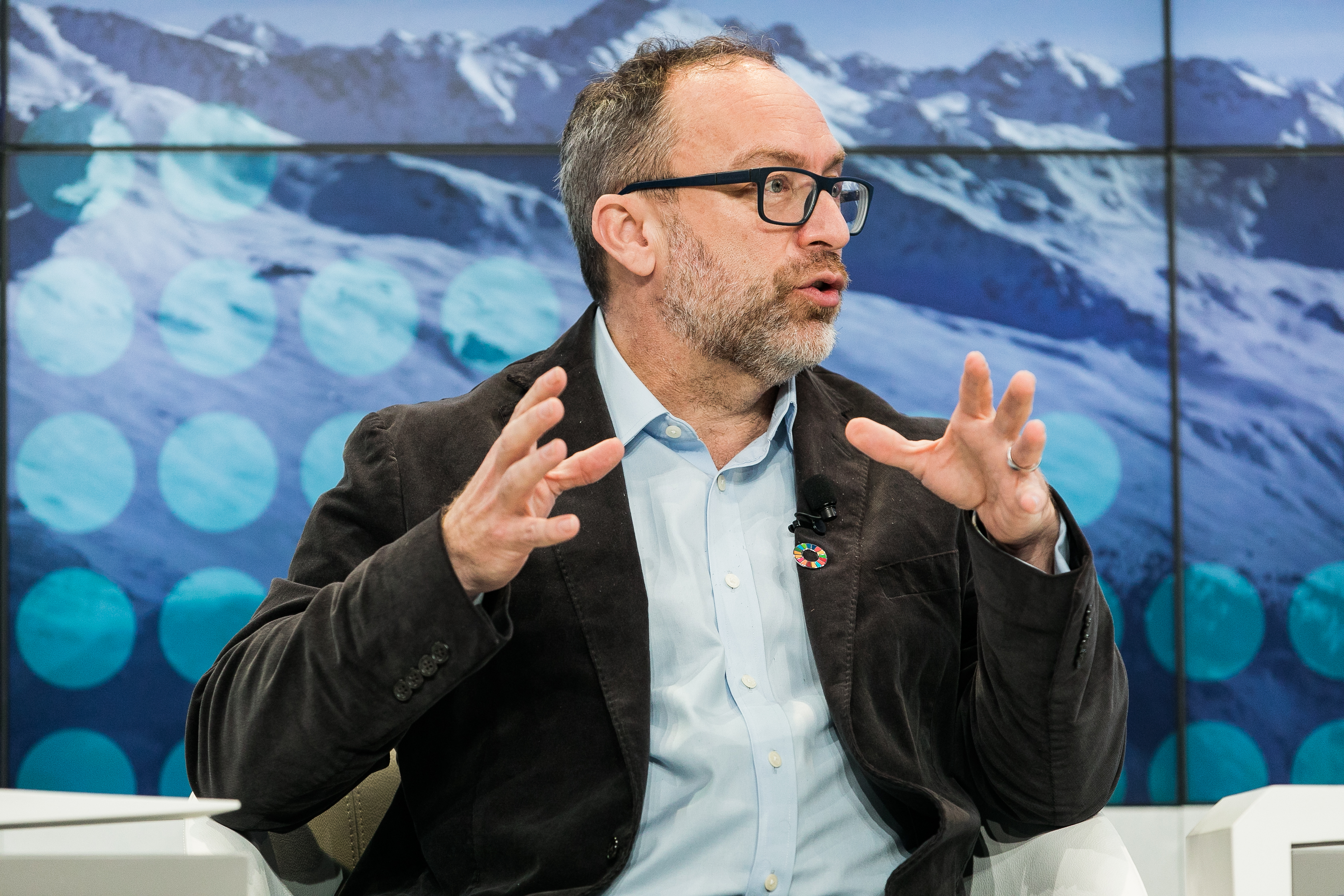
Wales at the 2018 World Economic Forum in Davos

The January/February 2006 issue of Maximum PC reported that Wales refused to comply with a request from the People's Republic of China to censor "politically sensitive" Wikipedia articles—other corporate Internet companies, such as Google, Yahoo! and Microsoft, had already yielded to Chinese government pressure. Wales stated that he would rather see companies such as Google adhere to Wikipedia's policy of freedom of information. In 2010, Wales criticized whistle-blower website WikiLeaks and its editor-in-chief Julian Assange, saying that their publication of Afghan war documents "could be enough to get someone killed"; furthermore, he expressed irritation at their use of the name "wiki": "What they're doing is not really a wiki. The essence of wiki is a collaborative editing process".

On December 11, 2007, Wales testified before the United States Senate Committee on Homeland Security and Governmental Affairs. He also submitted written testimony to the Senate Committee entitled "E-Government 2.0: Improving Innovation, Collaboration and Access".

In 2012, the Home Secretary of the UK was petitioned by Wales regarding his opposition to the extradition of Richard O'Dwyer to the US. After an agreement was reached to avoid the extradition, Wales commented, "This is very exciting news, and I'm pleased to hear it ... What needs to happen next is a serious reconsideration of the U.K. extradition treaty that would allow this sort of nonsense in the first place."

In August 2013, Wales criticized UK Prime Minister David Cameron's plan for an Internet porn filter, saying that the idea was "ridiculous". In November 2013, Wales also commented on the Snowden affair, describing Edward Snowden as "a hero" whom history would judge "very favorably"; additionally, Wales said the US public "would have never approved [the] sweeping surveillance program [publicized by Snowden]", had they been informed or asked about it.

During the Gamergate controversy in 2014, in response to an email from a computer science student claiming that Wikipedia has a "complete lack of any sort of attempt at neutrality regarding Gamergate", Wales allegedly wrote: "It is very difficult for me to buy into the notion that gamergate is 'really about ethics in journalism' when every single experience I have personally had with it involved pro-gg people insulting, threatening, doxxing, etc." and that the movement "has been permanently tarnished and highjacked [sic] by a handful of people who are not what you would hope." Wales defended his comments in response to backlash from supporters of Gamergate, saying that "it isn't about what I believe. Gg is famous for harassment. Stop and think about why."

In November 2019, Wales accused Twitter of giving preferential treatment to high-profile figures such as Trump and Elon Musk for not banning or blocking them for their controversial statements. In May 2020, Wales criticized Trump for threatening to regulate social media companies.

In September 2021, Wales said that Facebook and Twitter should combat misinformation and abuse on their platforms by deploying volunteer moderators to monitor controversial posts. In October 2021, Wales said that "Protecting strong encryption is essential for protecting the human rights of millions of people around the world."

In May 2022, in response to Elon Musk's proposed acquisition of Twitter, Wales said that "I think he's got some good and bad ideas, based on his public statements", adding that "On the other hand, Twitter in five years' time could be much better than it is today, or Twitter could be dead in five years' time, depending on the decisions he makes." During the COVID-19 pandemic, Wales stated on Wikipedia that the consensus in the mainstream media surrounding the lab leak theory seemed to have shifted from "this is highly unlikely, and only conspiracy theorists are pushing this narrative" to "this is one of the plausible hypotheses."

== Personal life ==
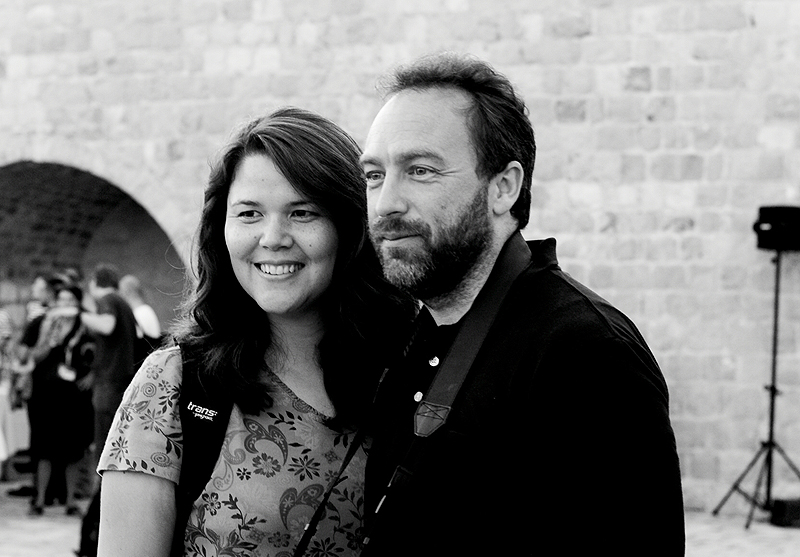
Wales with his second wife, Christine Rohan, in 2007

Wales has been married three times. At the age of 20, he married Pamela Green, a co-worker at a grocery store in Alabama. They divorced in 1993. He met his second wife, Christine Rohan, through a friend in Chicago while she worked as a steel trader for Mitsubishi. They were married in Monroe County, Florida, in March 1997, and had a daughter before separating in 2008. They divorced in 2011. Wales moved to San Diego in 1998, and after becoming disillusioned with the housing market there, moved in 2002 to St. Petersburg, Florida.

He had a brief relationship with Canadian conservative columnist Rachel Marsden in 2008 that began after Marsden contacted Wales about her Wikipedia biography. After accusations that Wales' relationship constituted a conflict of interest, he stated that there had been a relationship but that it was over and that it had not influenced any matters on Wikipedia, a statement Marsden disputed.

Wales married Kate Garvey at Wesley's Chapel in London on October 6, 2012. Garvey is Tony Blair's former diary secretary; the couple met in Davos, Switzerland. Wales has two daughters with Garvey in addition to his daughter with Rohan. Wales is irreligious. In an interview with Big Think, he said his philosophy is firmly rooted in reason, and that he is a complete non-believer. He is a passionate cook.

Wales has lived in London since 2012, and became a British citizen in 2019. In 2021, on The Tim Ferriss Show podcast, he revealed that he secretly lived in Buenos Aires, Argentina, for one month after reading Ferriss's book The 4-Hour Workweek.

Wales's book The Seven Rules of Trust was published in October 2025 by Penguin Random House. It was described by the publisher as a "sweeping reflection on the global crisis of credibility and knowledge" with the book examining the "rules of trust" that enabled the growth and success of Wikipedia.

== Publications ==
- Brooks, Robert; Corson, Jon; Wales, Jimmy Donal (1994). "The Pricing of Index Options When the Underlying Assets All Follow a Lognormal Diffusion". Advances in Futures and Options Research. 7. SSRN 5735.
- Mons, B.; Ashburner, M.; Chichester, C.; Van Mulligen, E.; Weeber, M.; Den Dunnen, J.; Van Ommen, G. J.; Musen, M.; Cockerill, M.; Hermjakob, H.; Mons, A.; Packer, A.; Pacheco, R.; Lewis, S.; Berkeley, A.; Melton, W.; Barris, N.; Wales, J.; Meijssen, G.; Moeller, E.; Roes, P.; Borner, K.; Bairoch, A. (2008). "Calling on a million minds for community annotation in WikiProteins". Genome Biology. 9 (5): R89. doi:10.1186/gb-2008-9-5-r89. ISSN 1465-6906. PMC 2441475. PMID 18507872.
- Wales, Jimmy; Weckerle, Andrea (December 31, 2008). "Foreword". In Fraser, Matthew; Dutta, Soumitra (eds.). Throwing Sheep in the Boardroom: How Online Social Networking Will Transform Your Life, Work and World (1st ed.). Wiley. ISBN 978-0-470-74014-9. OCLC 233939846.
- Wales, Jimmy; Weckerle, Andrea (January 8, 2009). "Commentary: Create a tech-friendly U.S. government". CNN. Archived from the original on August 16, 2011.
- Wales, Jimmy; Weckerle, Andrea (February 10, 2009). "Foreword". In Powell, Juliette (ed.). 33 Million People in the Room: How to Create, Influence, and Run a Successful Business with Social Networking (1st ed.). Financial Times Press. ISBN 978-0-13-715435-7. OCLC 244066502.
- Wales, Jimmy; Weckerle, Andrea (March 3, 2009). "Foreword". In Weber, Larry (ed.). Marketing to the Social Web: How Digital Customer Communities Build Your Business (2nd ed.). Wiley. ISBN 978-0-470-41097-4. OCLC 244060887.
- Wales, Jimmy (March 17, 2009). "Foreword". In Lih, Andrew (ed.). The Wikipedia Revolution: How a Bunch of Nobodies Created the World's Greatest Encyclopedia (1st ed.). Hyperion. ISBN 978-1-4013-0371-6. OCLC 232977686.
- Wales, Jimmy; Weckerle, Andrea (March 30, 2009). "Most Define User-Generated Content Too Narrowly". Advertising Age. 80.
- Wales, Jimmy; Weckerle, Andrea (December 28, 2009). "Keep a Civil Cybertongue". The Wall Street Journal. Archived from the original on May 19, 2017.
- Wales, Jimmy; Gardner, Dan (October 28, 2025). The Seven Rules of Trust: A Blueprint for Building Things That Last (1st ed.). Penguin Random House. ISBN 978-0-593-72746-1.

== Honours ==
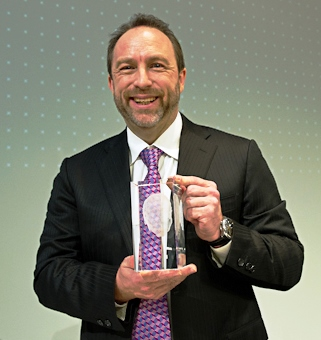
Wales at the 2011 Gottlieb Duttweiler Awards Show

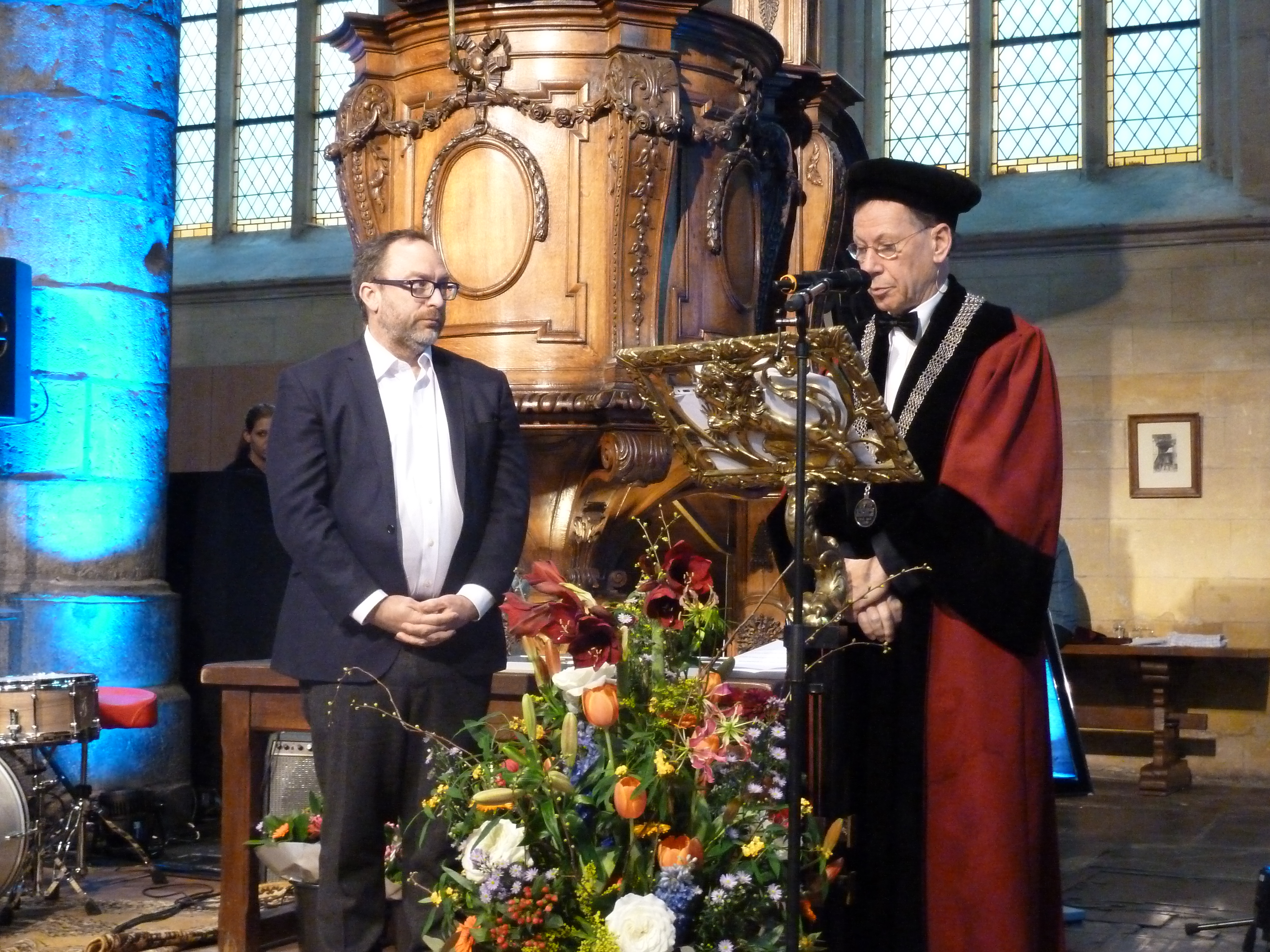
Wales receives an honorary doctorate from Maastricht University, 2015

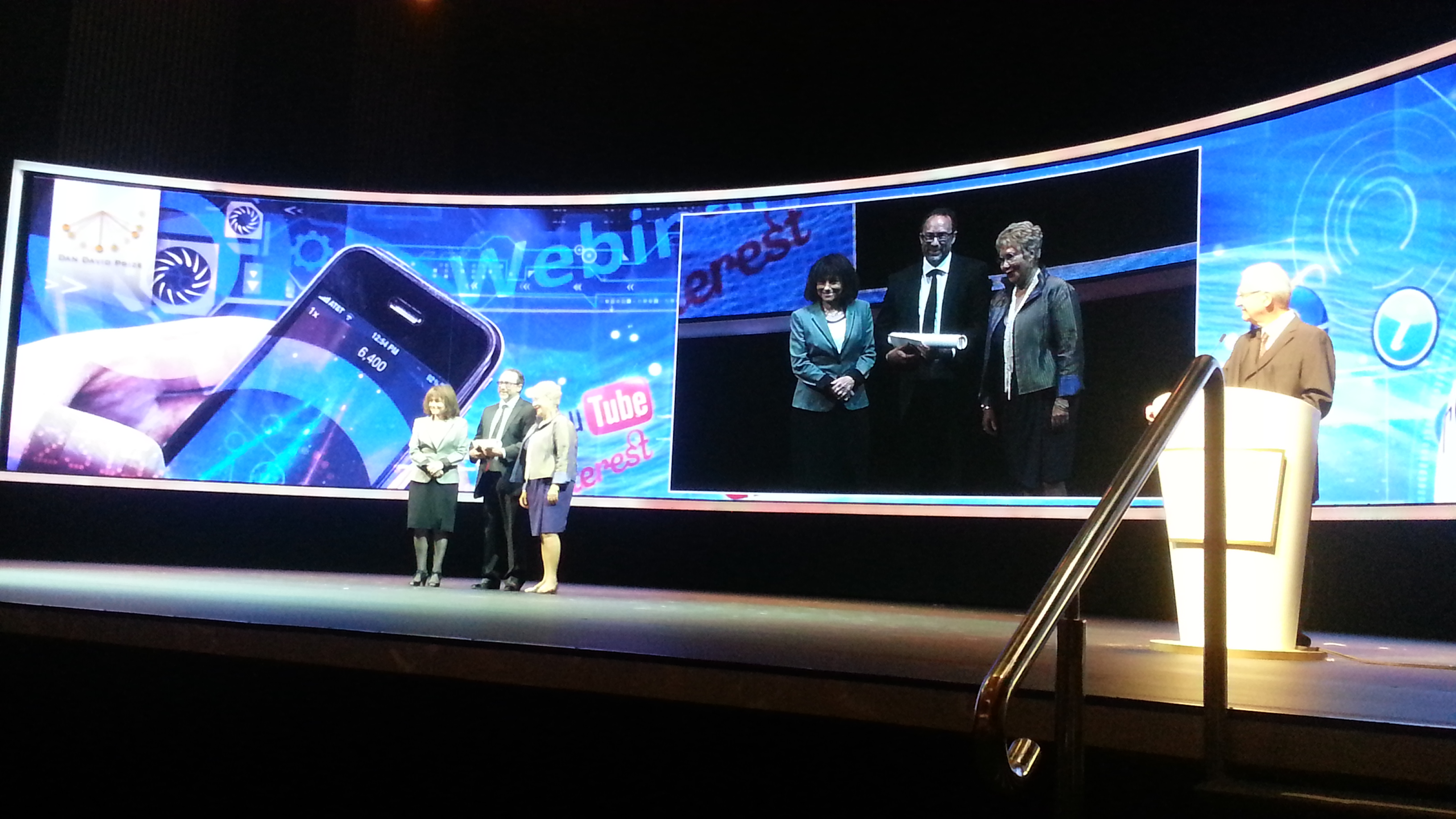
Jimmy Wales accepting the Dan David Prize at Tel Aviv University, 2015

=== Awards ===
- 2008 Global Brand Icon of the Year Award,
- 2009 Nokia Foundation annual award
- 2009: The Business Process Award at the 7th Annual Innovation Awards and Summit by The Economist
- Pioneer Award
- 2011: Gottlieb Duttweiler Prize
- 2011: The Leonardo European Corporate Learning Award
- 2013 UNESCO Niels Bohr Medal
- 2013: Induction into the Internet Hall of Fame in 2013.
- 2014: Tech4Good Awards "Special Award"
- 2014: Mohammed bin Rashid Knowledge Award
- 2015: Common Wealth Award of Distinguished Service
- 2015: The Dan David Prize
- 2017: The President's Medal of the British Academy

=== Honorary degrees ===
- Honorary degrees from Knox College, Amherst College, Stevenson University, Argentina's Universidad Empresarial Siglo 21, and Russia's MIREA University.
- 2014: Doctorate Honoris Causa by the Faculty of Communication Sciences of the Università della Svizzera italiana (USI Lugano, Switzerland)
- 2014: Honorary degree of Doctor of Letters from Nobel laureate Muhammad Yunus at Glasgow Caledonian University in Scotland
- 2015: Maastricht University awarded a Doctorate Honoris Causa to Wales
- 2016: Doctorate Honoris Causa from the Université Catholique de Louvain

== See also ==
- List of Wikipedia people
