= The Seven Rules of Trust =

2025 book by Jimmy Wales and Dan Gardner

- Author: Jimmy Wales; Dan Gardner
- Language: English
- Genre: Business
- Publisher: Crown Currency, Bloomsbury
- Publication date: October 28, 2025
- Website: sites.prh.com/the-seven-rules-of-trust

The Seven Rules of Trust (Note: The book is subtitled "A Blueprint for Building Things That Last" as published by Crown Currency and "Why It Is Today's Most Essential Superpower" as published by Bloomsbury.) is a book by Jimmy Wales written with Dan Gardner and published by Crown Currency and Bloomsbury on October 28, 2025. The book presents Wikipedia co-founder Wales's view on how to mend division in society through the building of trust in seven rules, which serve as subheadings in the book.

== Background ==
Jimmy Wales is an American Internet entrepreneur who co-founded the online encyclopedia Wikipedia in 2001. Dan Gardner is a Canadian academic who previously wrote the 2008 book Risk: The Science and Politics of Fear and co-authored the 2015 book Superforecasting with Philip E. Tetlock.

== Premise ==
In The Seven Rules of Trust, Wales presents his view on how the trust-based model of Wikipedia can be applied to address the problem of polarization in the United States or the world. For Wales, the solution to division in society lies in trust, for which he provides seven rules on how to build:

1. Make It Personal
2. Be Positive About People
3. Create a Clear Purpose
4. Be Trusting
5. Be Civil
6. Be Independent
7. Be Transparent

These rules serve as subheadings for each of the first seven chapters of the book.

== Publication ==
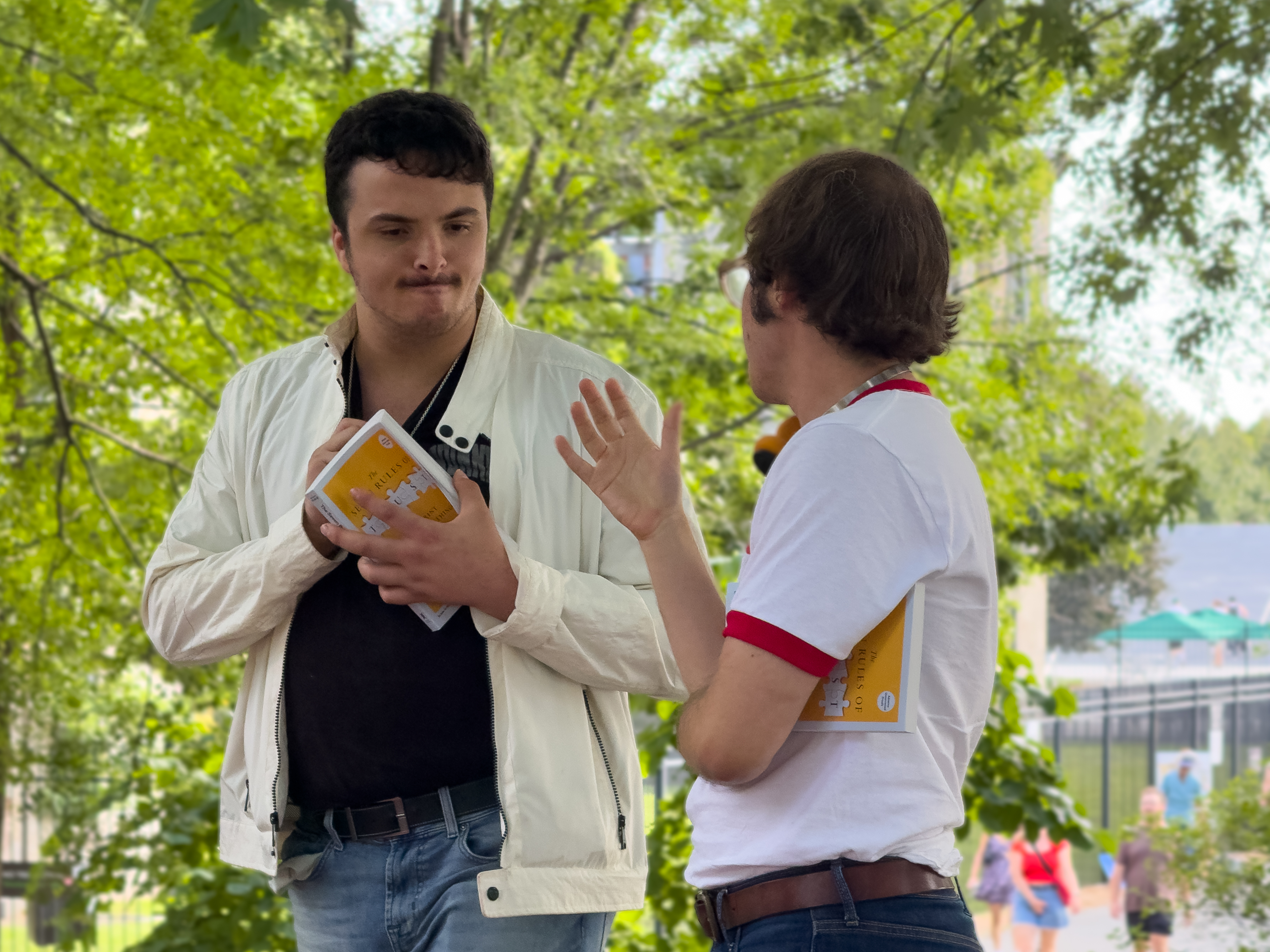
Two participants at the NYC Wiknic talk to each other while holding early copies of the book, August 2025.

By April 2025, translation rights had been sold in 15 other territories, and the book was scheduled for release on October 28, 2025 by Crown Currency in the US and Bloomsbury in Commonwealth countries (excluding Canada). Two days prior to publication, an excerpt was published in The Times, and on the publication day October 28, excerpts of the book were published as essays in the magazines Time and Fortune. A German translation by Ursula Held, Oliver Lingner, and Hans Freundl was published by Piper Verlag at the end of the month.

== Media tour ==
Wales embarked on a media tour to promote The Seven Rules of Trust. In the lead-up to the book's release, he gave an interview with The New York Times where he discussed the book, the issue of culture war and how it has affected Wikipedia, and criticisms of the project. Wales also talked about the book in interviews with The Guardian, Radio New Zealand, Big Think, Alabama Public Radio, BBC Science Focus, the Irish Independent, and Nature. While on CNN, Wales was questioned by Walter Isaacson about the Wikipedia article "Gaza genocide," which Wales himself criticized as "one of the worst Wikipedia entries I’ve seen in a very long time," leading him to intervene on the article's talk page. During the podcast Jung & Naiv, Wales abruptly stormed off the set after interviewer Tilo Jung pressed him about his claim of being Wikipedia's sole founder—only 48 seconds after the episode had started.

== Reception ==
=== Critical ===
Wales gives a presentation of the book at Wikimania 2025.

The book was described by Andrew Hill of the Financial Times as reading "like a manifesto." It was included in the newspaper's "Business books: What to read this month" list, although Hill described the final section of the book as "slightly rushed." Kirkus Reviews commented that some of the rules provided in the book were not entirely original, but praised the book for its "invigorating plea for collaboration and respectful debate." Similarly, Andrew Paul Wood of the New Zealand Listener described the message of the book as "common sense", boiling it down to the Golden Rule of treating others as one would want to be treated by them. Karlin Lillington praised the book in The Irish Times and called it "a worthy addition to anyone's internet history bookshelf."

=== Commercial ===
The book was ranked 86th place on USA Today's top 150 bestseller list on November 5, 2025.

== See also ==
- Bibliography of Wikipedia
