= Saint-Beauzire =

Saint-Beauzire may refer to the following places in France:

- Saint-Beauzire, Haute-Loire, a commune in the Haute-Loire department
- Saint-Beauzire, Puy-de-Dôme, a commune in the Puy-de-Dôme department
