= Château de Bosbomparent =

Castle in Auvergne-Rhône-Alpes, France

Coordinates: 45.2929°N 3.2876°E

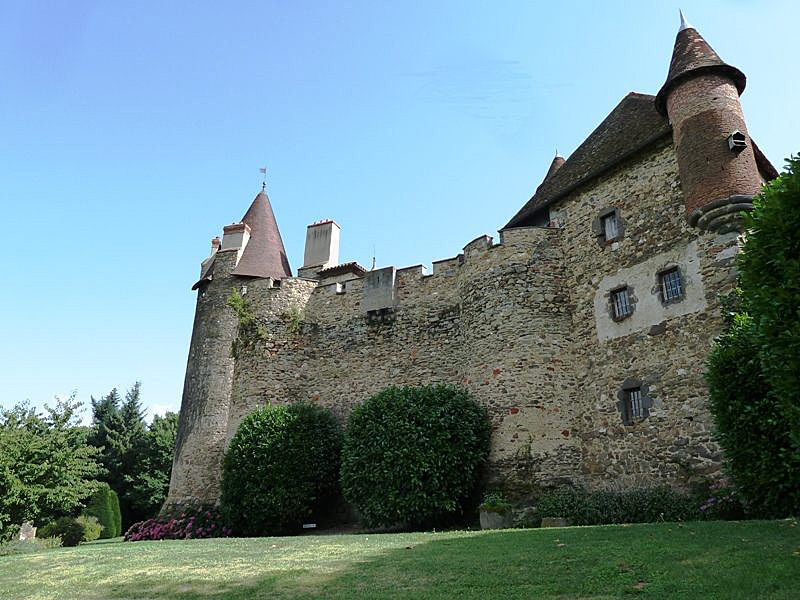

The Château de Bosbomparent is a restored castle in the commune of Saint-Beauzire in the Haute-Loire département of France.

It was constructed in the 14th century, deteriorated during the 19th century, and was burned and abandoned until 1976. It was then restored and is now occupied year-round. Concerts and other events are held during the summer.

It consists of a main residential building with a staircase tower and a large corner tower. The main building is linked by an enceinte to a high square tower.

It has been listed since 2001 as a monument historique by the French Ministry of Culture.

Visits to the grounds and the keep are possible during the summer months.

== See also ==
- List of castles in France
