= Malintrat =

- Commune
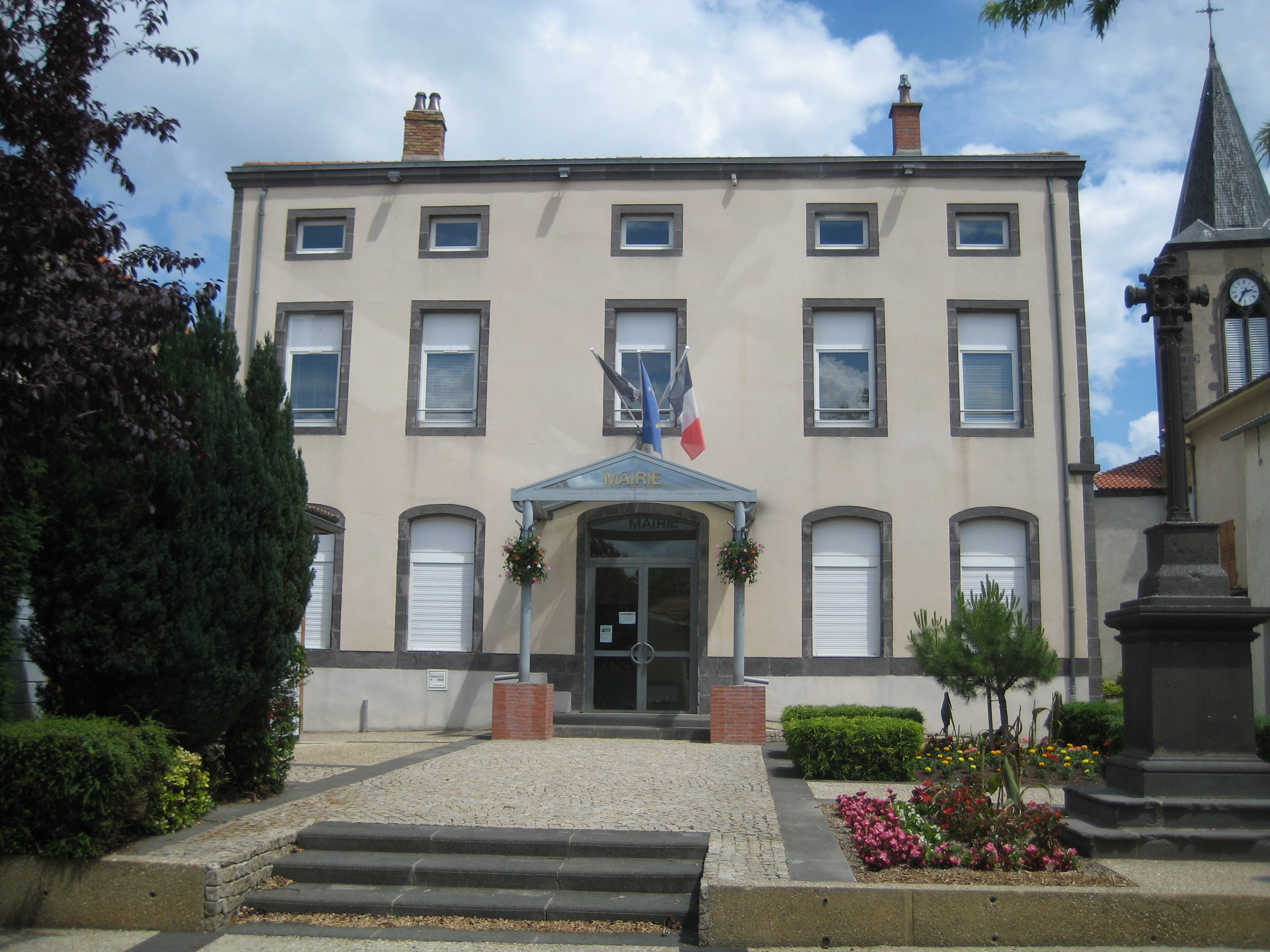
- The town hall in Malintrat

- Coat of arms
- Location of Malintrat
- Location within France Location within Auvergne-Rhône-Alpes
- Coordinates: 45°48′57″N 3°11′12″E
- Country: France
- Region: Auvergne-Rhône-Alpes
- Department: Puy-de-Dôme
- Arrondissement: Riom
- Canton: Gerzat
- Intercommunality: CA Riom Limagne et Volcans

Government
  - Mayor (2026–32): Andre Magnoux
- Area^{1}: 8.16 km^{2} (3.15 sq mi)
- Highest elevation: 332 m (1,089 ft)
- Lowest elevation: 313 m (1,027 ft)
- Population (2023): 1,151
  - Density: 141/km^{2} (365/sq mi)
- Time zone: UTC+01:00 (CET)
  - Summer (DST): UTC+02:00 (CEST)
- INSEE/Postal code: 63204 /63510
- ^{1} French Land Register data, which excludes lakes, ponds, glaciers > 1 km^{2} (0.386 sq mi or 247 acres) and river estuaries.

Malintrat (French pronunciation: [malɛ̃tʁa]) is a commune in the Puy-de-Dôme département in Auvergne-Rhône-Alpes in central France.

Malintrat is located at east of Clermont-Ferrand between autoroutes A710 and A720, north of the Clermont-Ferrand/Auvergne airport in Aulnat. Malintrat forms part of the Clermont-Ferrand urban area.

== History ==
In 1839, part of the commune separated to form a new commune, Aulnat.

== Demographics ==
Historical population

Year	Pop.	±% p.a.
1911	515	—
1921	447	−1.41%
1931	438	−0.20%
1936	395	−2.05%
1946	435	+0.97%
1954	445	+0.28%
1962	518	+1.92%
1968	543	+0.79%

Year	Pop.	±% p.a.
1975	575	+0.82%
1982	800	+4.83%
1990	921	+1.78%
1999	870	−0.63%
2007	1,035	+2.19%
2012	997	−0.75%
2017	1,132	+2.57%
2023	1,151	+0.28%

Source: EHESS and INSEE

== Notable people ==
- Florence Nibart-Devouard, former chair of the Wikimedia Foundation board of trustees

== See also ==
- Communes of the Puy-de-Dôme department
