= Kate Garvey =

British public relations executive

Kate Garvey OBE
- Born: 1971 (age 54–55)
- Occupations: Diary secretary; publicist
- Years active: 1994–present
- Spouse: Jimmy Wales (m. 2012)
- Children: 2

Katharine Garvey (born c. 1971) is an English public relations executive and the former diary secretary of British prime minister Tony Blair. She is a co-founder of Project Everyone, a communications and campaigning agency promoting the United Nations' Sustainable Development Goals.

== Career ==
=== Political staff member ===
Garvey's career began as a personal assistant for the Labour Party under leader Neil Kinnock. From there, she moved to become diary secretary for Tony Blair.

In 1994, during Blair's leadership bid, Garvey suggested that Peter Mandelson, who was at the time being derided by the trade unions and other Labour factions, should adopt a "nom de guerre" to conceal his considerable role within the campaign team. Mandelson agreed to be called "Bobby" for the duration. In his victory speech, Blair referred to Mandelson by the false name.

From 1997 until 2005, except for campaign seasons, Garvey worked in the Prime Minister's Private Office. She was responsible for presentation and planning of domestic and foreign events and visits. By 2005, Garvey's role had progressed to scheduling. Aide Katie Kay, who had worked for Blair's advisor John Birt, had taken over the diary secretary job.

On the campaign circuit, Garvey worked on Blair's behalf in the general election of 1997 and of 2001. A 2001 story in The Daily Telegraph, "Babes on the Bus who keep the campaign journalists at bay", described Garvey as one of a band of women led by Anji Hunter who kept discipline on the political tour with their superior-to-male attention to detail. In Blair's 2005 election, Garvey ran his election tour.

In his memoir A Journey, Blair reflected on Garvey's importance:

"[She] was the gatekeeper, the custodian of the diary. There is a whole PhD thesis to be written by some smart political student about the importance of scheduling to a modern prime minister or president...She ran the diary with a grip of iron and was quite prepared to squeeze the balls very hard indeed of anyone who interfered, but with a winning smile of course."

Garvey was made an Officer of the Order of the British Empire in 2025.

=== Public relations ===
After leaving government in 2005, Garvey worked on Bob Geldof's charity campaign, Make Poverty History, which produced the Live 8 concerts. That same year, she was hired by PR firm Freud Communications as the head of public and social affairs.

Garvey was selected by the World Economic Forum in 2007 as a "Young Global Leader", a designation awarded to persons under 40 who have shown leadership qualities.

Garvey is mentioned in a 2008 Telegraph profile on Matthew Freud as 'reportedly managing the Freud-Blair relationship'. The article describes an ongoing connection of Blair and Freud in terms of socialising (Freud throwing celebrity-attended parties) as well as Freud advising Tony and Cherie Blair on how to best exploit events such as the World Economic Forum's Davos retreat ("what parties to go to").

A 2010 article by PRWeek mentioned Garvey's clients as including the 2012 Summer Olympics and Paralympics, both held in London. Other clients included the Tony Blair Faith Foundation, Live Earth, the Maternal Mortality campaign and Jordan's Queen Rania. An earlier biography mentioned Garvey as having served the singer Bono.

Garvey is a co-founder of Project Everyone, a campaign group dedicated to promoting the United Nations' Sustainable Development Goals.

== Personal life ==
On 6 October 2012, Garvey married Jimmy Wales, the co-founder of Wikipedia, at Wesley's Chapel in London, becoming Wales's third wife. The couple met in Monaco in 2009 and began dating in 2010 after meeting again at Davos. They had both been Young Global Leaders in 2007.

Garvey and Wales live in Marylebone, London with their two daughters. Wales also has one daughter from a previous marriage.
