= Hebrew Wikipedia =

Hebrew-language edition of Wikipedia

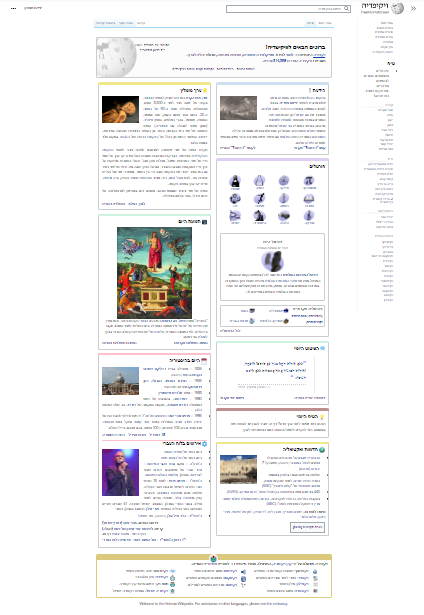
- Main Page of the Hebrew Wikipedia in 2022
- Website type: Internet encyclopedia project
- Available in: Hebrew
- Owner: Wikimedia Foundation
- Website: he.wikipedia.org
- Commercial: No
- Registration: Optional
- Users: 1.35 million (as of 20 September 2026)
- Launched: 8 July 2003; 23 years ago
- Content license: Creative Commons Attribution/ Share-Alike 4.0 (most text also dual-licensed under GFDL); Media licensing varies

Hebrew Wikipedia (Hebrew: ויקיפדיה העברית, romanized: Vikipedia HaIvrit, IPA: [vikiˈpedja ha(ʔ)ivˈʁit]) is the Hebrew language edition of Wikipedia. This edition was started on 8 July 2003 and contains 405,193 articles as of 20 September 2026.

== History ==
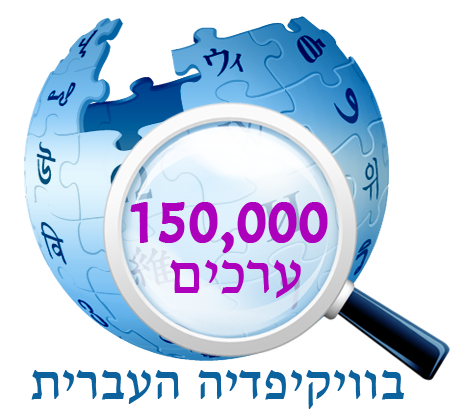
Hebrew Wikipedia logo marking 150,000 articles

=== Timeline ===
- 8 July 2003: The Hebrew edition of Wikipedia was launched.
- 25 October 2003: The 1,000th article was written.
- 22 July 2004: The first meeting of Hebrew Wikipedians took place in Tel Aviv, Israel.
- 10 September 2004: The 10,000th article was written.
- 20 September 2004: The Hebrew version of the Flag of Kazakhstan article became the one millionth article created in all Wikipedias.
- 24 December 2006: The 50,000th article was written.
- 10 January 2010: The 100,000th article was written.
- 29 August 2013: The 150,000th article was written.
- 28 December 2016: The 200,000th article was written.
- 15 September 2019: The 250,000th article was written.
- 3 August 2021: The 300,000th article was written.
- 3 July 2026: The 400,000th article was written.

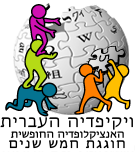
Hebrew Wikipedia's 5th birthday logo

Hebrew Wikipedia features several organized article writing projects, among them Wikitort – an academic project to write original articles about tort law, PhysiWiki – a project to write and improve articles about physics with the cooperation of the Weizmann Institute of Science, and ongoing academic projects. Another major topic is Jewish history and the History of Israel. In 2006, the Elef Millim project (English: Thousand Words/Thousand Miles project) was launched to provide Wikipedia with free images. Groups of Wikipedians meet for field trips around the country to take pictures of Israeli sites.

Hebrew spelling is a matter of debate. Since the standards published by the Academy of the Hebrew Language are not always meticulously followed in common usage, the Hebrew Wikipedia community decides on problematic cases of spelling through discussion and polls to ensure consistency. When technically possible, spelling decisions are periodically enforced using automatic replacement by a bot.

Hebrew Wikipedia's requirements for notability standards are relatively strict.

Hebrew Wikipedia organizes yearly competitions, sometimes with the assistance of the Wikimedia Foundation, as well as social gatherings and picnics.

Haaretz journalist Omer Benjakob said in 2023 in relation to the Israeli–Palestinian conflict that "Unlike many Wikipedias in languages with a global span, like English, Spanish or Arabic, Hebrew Wikipedia resembles its Polish or Hungarian counterparts in being more of an "Israeli Wikipedia." It can be seen as having an implicit pro-Israeli bias." Historian Shira Klein, comparing coverage of the Gaza war on English and Hebrew Wikipedia in 2024, said that "where the distortions lie, are in the Hebrew Wikipedia."

== 2010 Knesset meeting ==
On the occasion of the 100,000 articles milestone, the Science and Technology Committee of the Knesset (Israeli parliament) invited Wikipedia contributors and users to the 2 February 2010 morning meeting, to join in a debate about Wikipedia and other open-source resources. Some Wikipedia contributors at the meeting criticized "the lack of government cooperation with their efforts to compile a free online Hebrew-language encyclopedia," as well as sharing complaints from Wikipedia editors abroad that since the Israel Defense Forces does not release photos for free redistribution on the Internet, the sole source of available pictures for entries such as the Gaza War and the 2006 Lebanon War are the Palestinians.

== Hamichlol ==
Hamichlol (Hebrew: המכלול "The Entirety") is a mirror of the Hebrew Wikipedia. It contains articles copied from the Hebrew Wikipedia which are edited to be acceptable to certain Orthodox Jewish readers.

== Statistics ==
Hebrew Wikipedia statistics
Number of user accounts	Number of articles	Number of files	Number of active users	Number of administrators
1,354,368	405,193	89,162	6,661	26

As of January 2024, the Hebrew Wikipedia ranks among the best language editions in retention of new editors, while also having one of the highest edit revert rates.

== See also ==
- Wikimedia Israel
