= Dan Gardner (author) =

Canadian academic

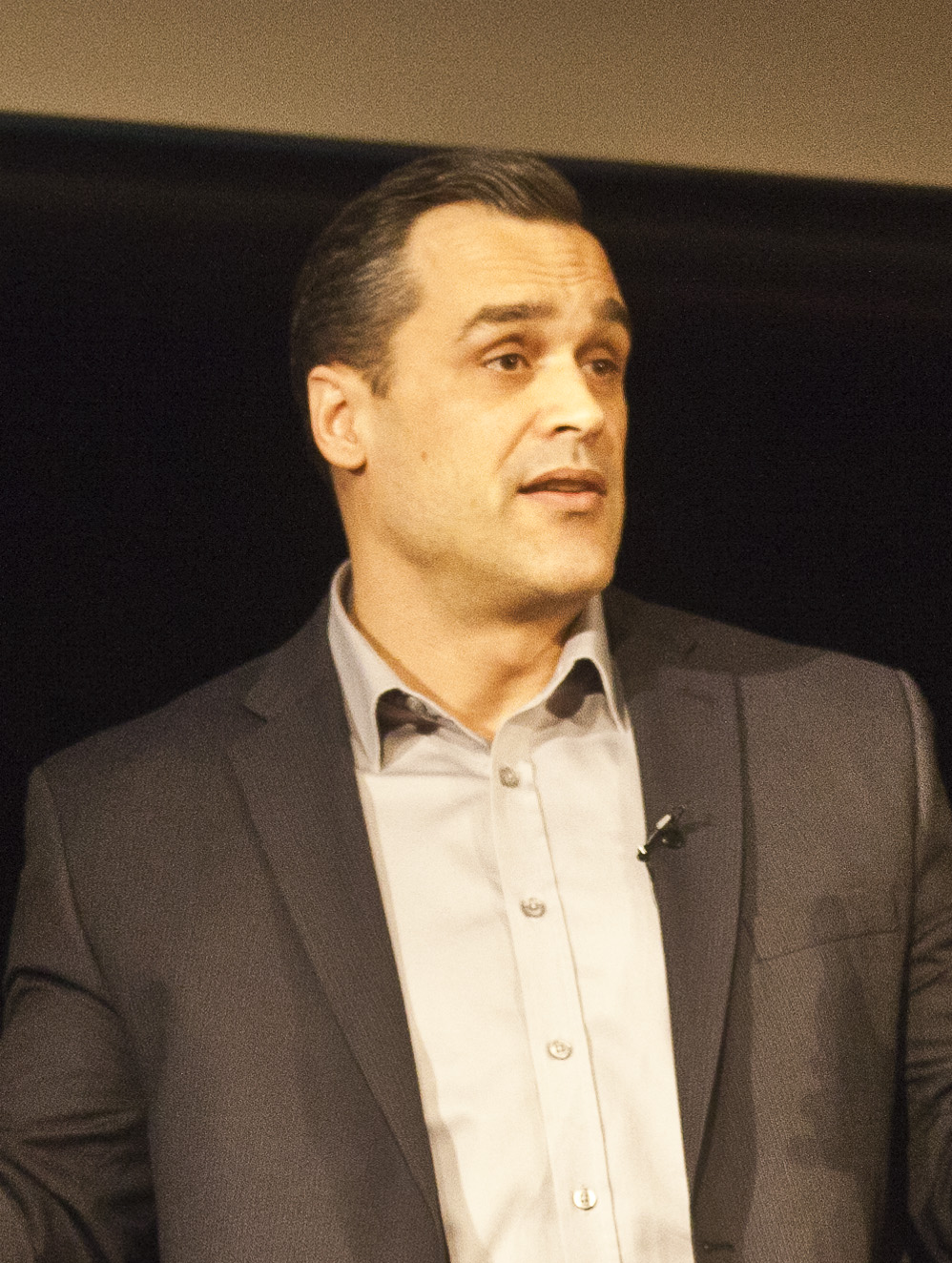
Gardner in 2011

Dan Gardner is a Canadian author and academic.

== Biography ==
Dan Gardner attended York University in Toronto, where he earned a Bachelor of Laws degree from Osgoode Hall Law School and a Master of Arts degree in history. Before publishing his first book, he worked for the Ottawa Citizen as a columnist and feature writer. He was the editor of Policy Options, a magazine, from 2015 to 2016 and then served as a senior advisor in the office of the prime minister of Canada. Gardner is an Honorary Senior Fellow of the Graduate School of Public Policy and International Affairs at the University of Ottawa in Ottawa, Ontario.

In 2008, Gardner published Risk, a book about how humans respond to fear and how illogical fear is exploited by political and commercial institutions. His next book, published in 2011, was Future Babble, a book about how so-called expert predictions of the future are often inaccurate and why people trust them despite their inaccuracies. The book was based primarily on research by Philip Tetlock. Gardner coauthored with Tetlock a 2015 follow-up book called Superforecasting. He also coauthored How Big Things Get Done, a 2023 book about megaprojects, with Bent Flyvbjerg, as well as The Seven Rules of Trust, a 2025 book about building trust, with Jimmy Wales.

== Publications ==
- Gardner, Dan (2008). Risk. London: Virgin. ISBN 978-1-9052-6415-5.
- — (2011). Future Babble. New York: Dutton. ISBN 978-0-5259-5205-3.
- —; Tetlock, Phillip E. (2015). Superforecasting. New York: Crown Publishers. ISBN 978-0-8041-3669-3.
- —; Flyvbjerg, Bent (2023). How Big Things Get Done. New York: Currency. ISBN 978-0-5932-3951-3.
- Wales, Jimmy; Gardner, Dan (2025). The Seven Rules of Trust. Crown Publishing Group. ISBN 978-0-5937-2746-1.
