= Florence Devouard =

French agronomist and former Chair of the Wikimedia Foundation (born 1968)

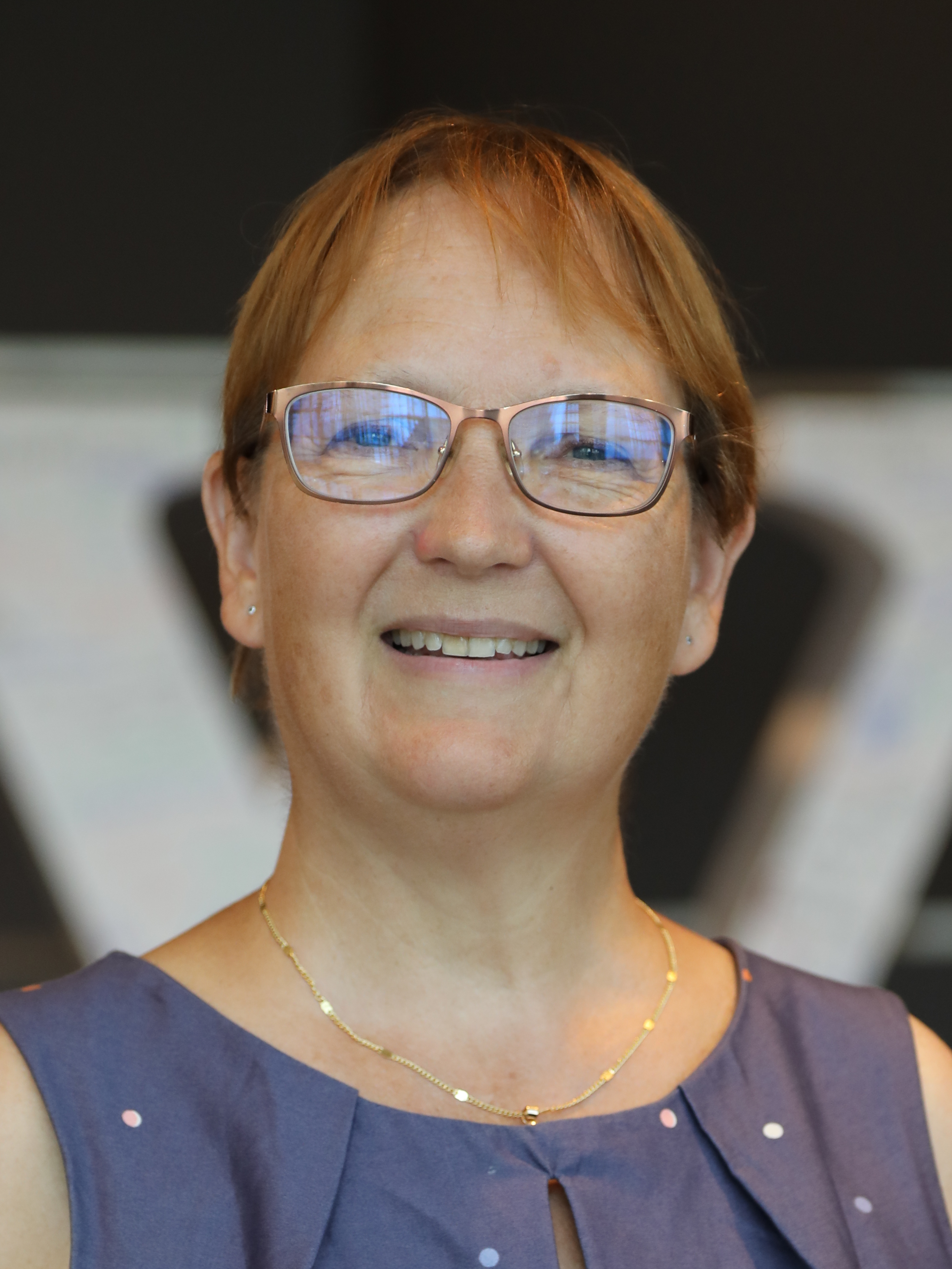
- Devouard in 2023

Chair of the Wikimedia Foundation
- In office 21 October 2006 – 17 July 2008
- Preceded by: Jimmy Wales
- Succeeded by: Michael Snow

Personal details
- Born: 10 September 1968 (age 57) Versailles, France
- Spouse: Bertrand Devouard
- Children: 3
- Occupation: Consultant in Internet Communication Strategy, Chair Emeritus of the Wikimedia Foundation

Florence Jacqueline Sylvie Devouard (née Nibart; born 10 September 1968) is a French agricultural engineer who served as the chair of the Wikimedia Foundation board of trustees between October 2006 and July 2008.

== Education ==
Devouard holds an engineering degree in agronomy from ENSAIA and a DEA in genetics and biotechnologies from INPL.

== Career ==
On 9 March 2008, Devouard was elected member of the municipal council of Malintrat.

Florence Devouard about the Wikimedia movement

Devouard joined the board of trustees of the Wikimedia Foundation in June 2004 and became its chair in October 2006, succeeding Jimmy Wales. She has served on the Advisory Board of the Foundation since July 2008.

Co-founder of Wikimedia France in October 2004, she was vice-chair of its board as of 2011 until December 2012.

== Recognition ==
On 16 May 2008, she was made a knight in the French National Order of Merit, proposed by the Ministry of Foreign Affairs as "chair of an international foundation".

== See also ==
- List of Wikipedia people
