= Gerzat =

- Commune
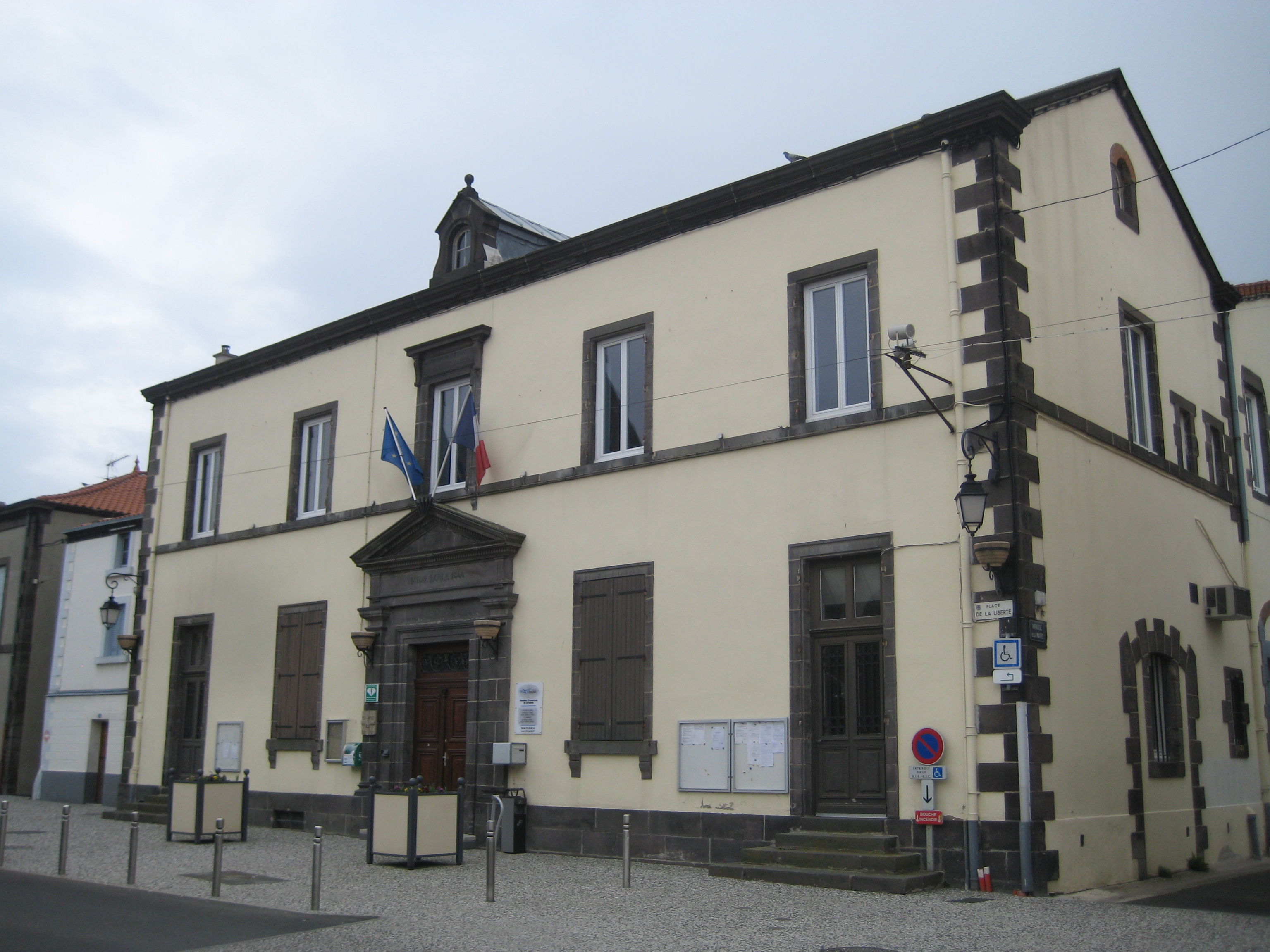
- The town hall in Gerzat

- Coat of arms
- Location of Gerzat
- Location within France Location within Auvergne-Rhône-Alpes
- Coordinates: 45°49′36″N 3°08′44″E
- Country: France
- Region: Auvergne-Rhône-Alpes
- Department: Puy-de-Dôme
- Arrondissement: Clermont-Ferrand
- Canton: Gerzat
- Intercommunality: Clermont Auvergne Métropole

Government
  - Mayor (2026–32): Serge Pichot
- Area^{1}: 16.28 km^{2} (6.29 sq mi)
- Highest elevation: 349 m (1,145 ft)
- Lowest elevation: 315 m (1,033 ft)
- Population (2023): 10,335
  - Density: 634.8/km^{2} (1,644/sq mi)
- Demonym(s): Gerzatois, Gerzatoises
- Time zone: UTC+01:00 (CET)
  - Summer (DST): UTC+02:00 (CEST)
- INSEE/Postal code: 63165 /63361
- Website: www.ville-gerzat.fr
- ^{1} French Land Register data, which excludes lakes, ponds, glaciers > 1 km^{2} (0.386 sq mi or 247 acres) and river estuaries.

Gerzat (French pronunciation: [ʒɛʁza]; Auvergnat: Gerzac) is a commune in the Puy-de-Dôme department in Auvergne in central France.

== Population ==
Historical population
| Year | Pop. | ±% p.a. |
|---|---|---|
| 1968 | 5,659 | — |
| 1975 | 7,666 | +4.43% |
| 1982 | 8,826 | +2.03% |
| 1990 | 9,229 | +0.56% |
| 1999 | 9,071 | −0.19% |
| 2007 | 10,030 | +1.26% |
| 2012 | 10,286 | +0.51% |
| 2017 | 10,365 | +0.15% |
| 2023 | 10,335 | −0.05% |
Source: INSEE

== See also ==
- Communes of the Puy-de-Dôme department
