= Saint-Beauzire, Puy-de-Dôme =

Saint-Beauzire
- Commune
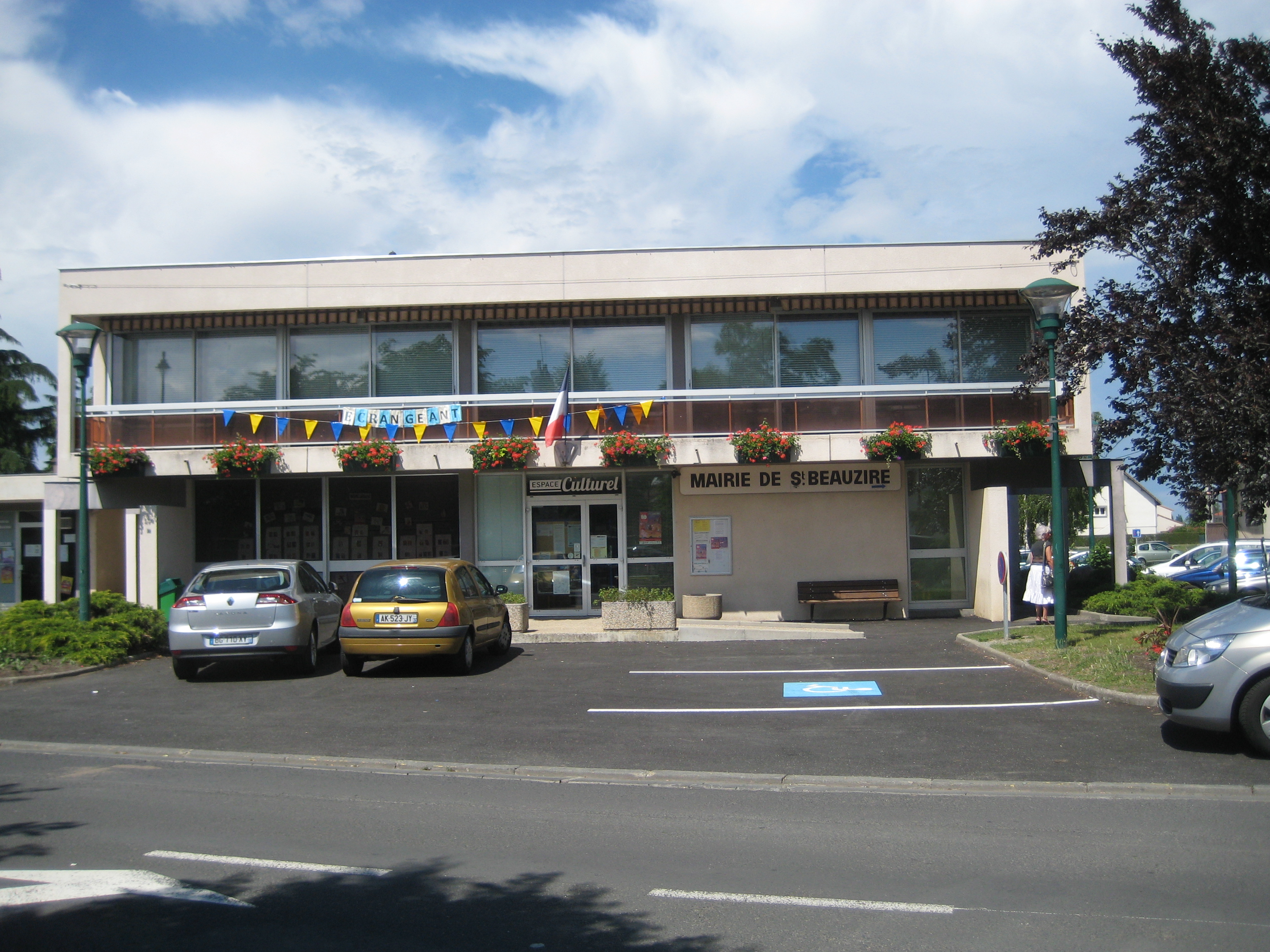
- The town hall in Saint-Beauzire

- Coat of arms
- Location of Saint-Beauzire
- Location within France Location within Auvergne-Rhône-Alpes
- Coordinates: 45°51′02″N 3°10′49″E
- Country: France
- Region: Auvergne-Rhône-Alpes
- Department: Puy-de-Dôme
- Arrondissement: Riom
- Canton: Gerzat
- Intercommunality: CA Riom Limagne et Volcans

Government
  - Mayor (2020–2026): Jean-Pierre Hebrard
- Area^{1}: 16.08 km^{2} (6.21 sq mi)
- Elevation: 318 m (1,043 ft)
- Highest elevation: 325 m (1,066 ft)
- Lowest elevation: 312 m (1,024 ft)
- Population (2023): 2,210
  - Density: 137/km^{2} (356/sq mi)
- Time zone: UTC+01:00 (CET)
  - Summer (DST): UTC+02:00 (CEST)
- INSEE/Postal code: 63322 /63360
- ^{1} French Land Register data, which excludes lakes, ponds, glaciers > 1 km^{2} (0.386 sq mi or 247 acres) and river estuaries.

Saint-Beauzire (French pronunciation: [sɛ̃ boziʁ]; Occitan: Sent Baudili) is a commune in the Puy-de-Dôme department in Auvergne in central France.

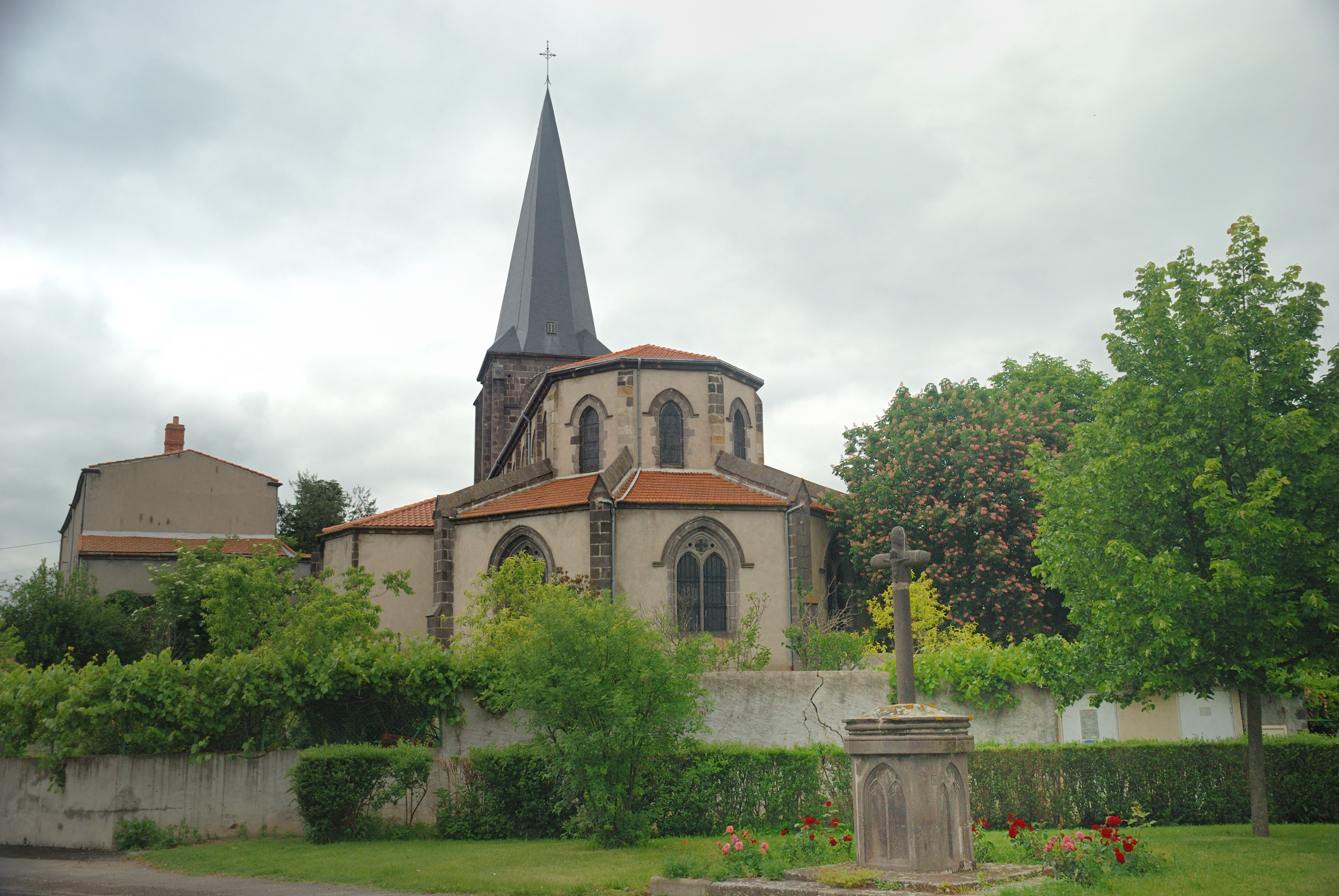
Saint-Beauzire's church.

== Population ==
Historical population
Year	Pop.	±% p.a.
1968	1,010	—
1975	1,400	+4.78%
1982	1,607	+1.99%
1990	1,872	+1.93%
1999	1,857	−0.09%
2007	2,073	+1.38%
2012	2,104	+0.30%
2017	2,180	+0.71%
2023	2,210	+0.23%
Source: INSEE

== Economy ==
The headquarters of Groupe Limagrain, an international agricultural co-operative group, specialized in field seeds, vegetable seeds and cereal products, are located in Saint-Beauzire.

A science park hosting biotechnology companies is located in Saint-Beauzire: Biopôle Clermont-Limagne.

== See also ==
- Communes of the Puy-de-Dôme department
