= Wikimedia Israel =

Wikimedia movement chapter

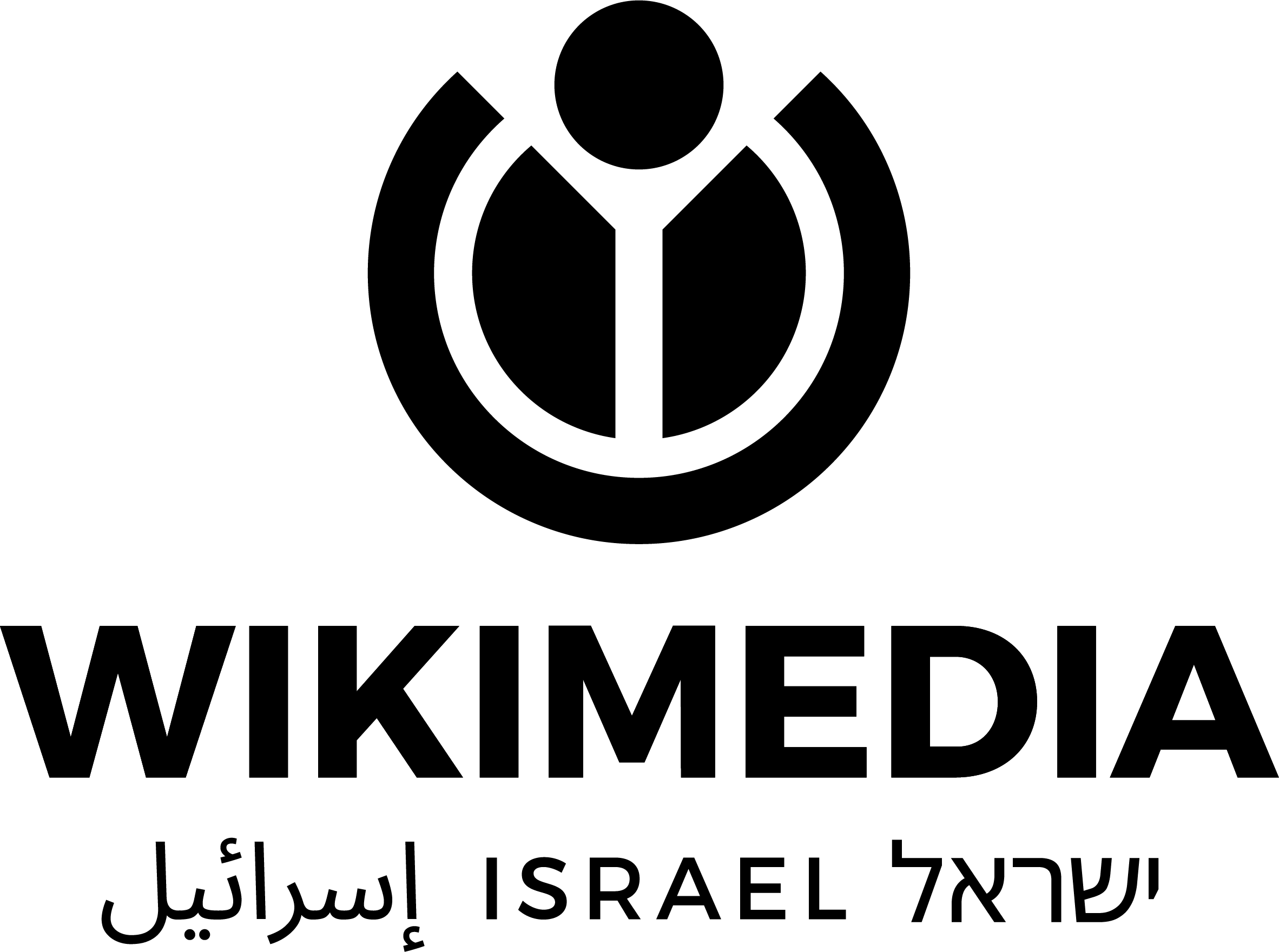
- Founded: 2007
- Type: Educational charity
- Location: Tel Aviv, Israel
- Region served: Israel
- Key people: Itzik Edri (Chair of the Board); Michal Lester (Chief Executive)
- Employees: 6
- Website: wikimedia.org.il
- Formerly called: ויקימדיה ישראל

Wikimedia Israel (Hebrew: ויקימדיה ישראל; Arabic: ويكيميديا إسرائيل) is an Israeli nonprofit organization working in cooperation with the Wikimedia Foundation to promote knowledge and education in Israel through the collection and dissemination of free content and the initiation of projects to facilitate access to databases.

Wikimedia Israel supports the community of Wikipedia volunteers, recruits new editors, establishes collaborations and partnerships, organizes events and conferences, and promotes the exposure of the public and the media to Wikipedia and the importance of free and shared content. In addition to Wikipedia editors, the organization initiates and supports the work of other volunteers (Wikimedia volunteers) who take part in activities organized by the organization and implements its projects and initiatives.

Wikimedia Israel was founded in 2007. It is one of 41 recognized chapters (national nonprofit organizations created to promote the interests of Wikimedia projects locally) around the world.

Wikimedia Israel is the only chapter that operates in a Hebrew-speaking environment, as well as an Arabic-speaking environment. On July 2, 2014, the speaker of Wikimedia Israel won the Roaring Lion Award from ISPRA (Israel Public Relations Association) in the Technology and Mobile category, for the PR work on the Hebrew Wikipedia 10th anniversary and collaboration with TV Channel 2.
