= Aulnat =

- Commune
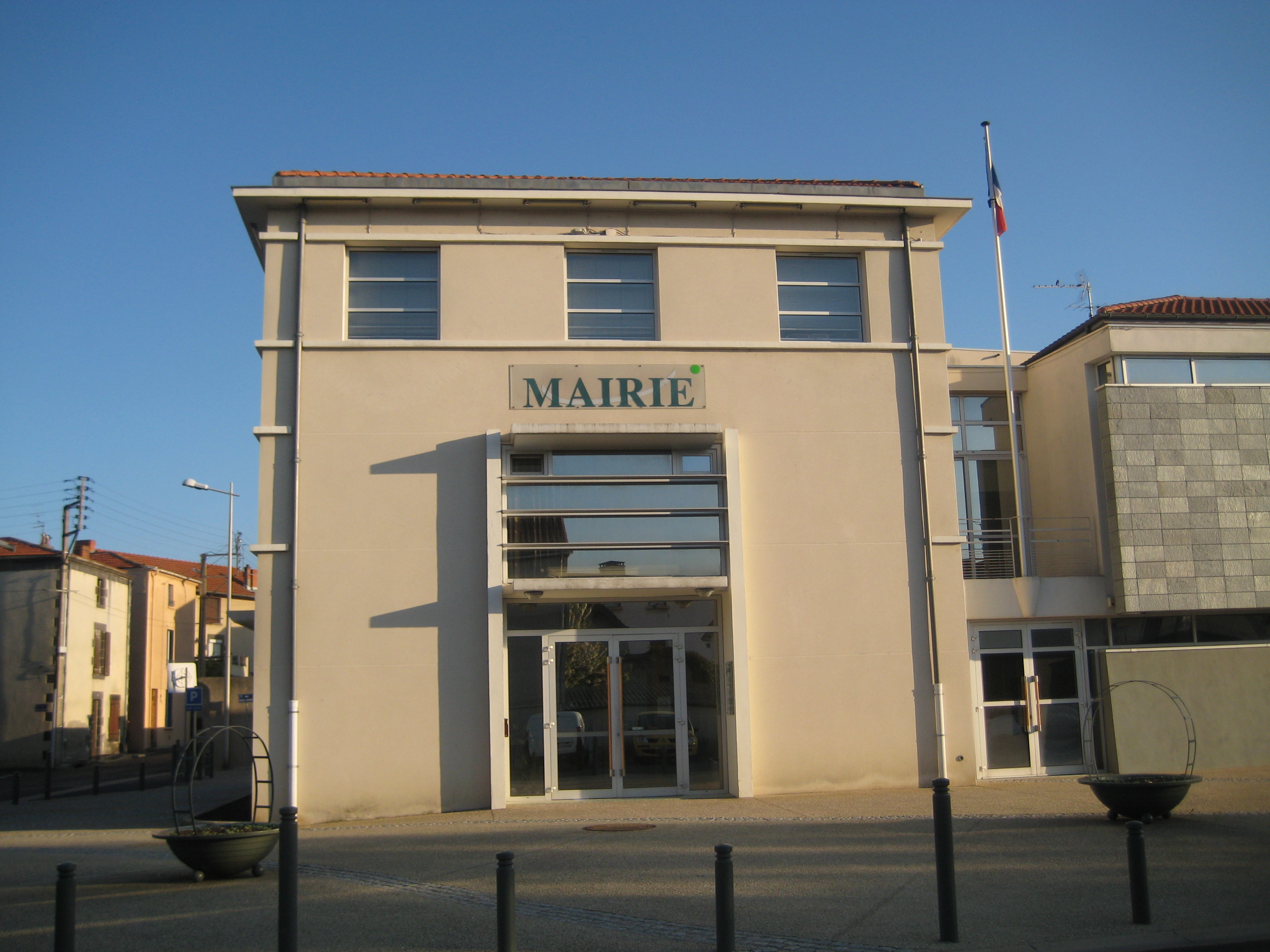
- The town hall in Aulnat

- Coat of arms
- Location of Aulnat
- Location within France Location within Auvergne-Rhône-Alpes
- Coordinates: 45°48′39″N 3°10′06″E
- Country: France
- Region: Auvergne-Rhône-Alpes
- Department: Puy-de-Dôme
- Arrondissement: Clermont-Ferrand
- Canton: Gerzat
- Intercommunality: Clermont Auvergne Métropole

Government
  - Mayor (2020–2026): Christine Mandon
- Area^{1}: 4.21 km^{2} (1.63 sq mi)
- Elevation: 329 m (1,079 ft)
- Highest elevation: 331 m (1,086 ft)
- Lowest elevation: 317 m (1,040 ft)
- Population (2023): 4,139
  - Density: 983/km^{2} (2,550/sq mi)
- Time zone: UTC+01:00 (CET)
  - Summer (DST): UTC+02:00 (CEST)
- INSEE/Postal code: 63019 /63510
- ^{1} French Land Register data, which excludes lakes, ponds, glaciers > 1 km^{2} (0.386 sq mi or 247 acres) and river estuaries.

Aulnat (French pronunciation: [o(l)na]) is a commune in the Puy-de-Dôme department in Auvergne-Rhône-Alpes in central France.

== Population ==
Historical population

Year	Pop.	±% p.a.
1841	903	—
1846	950	+1.02%
1851	924	−0.55%
1856	1,471	+9.75%
1861	1,403	−0.94%
1866	1,361	−0.61%
1872	1,338	−0.28%
1876	1,209	−2.50%
1881	1,231	+0.36%
1886	1,183	−0.79%
1891	1,224	+0.68%
1896	1,203	−0.35%
1901	1,244	+0.67%
1906	1,052	−3.30%
1911	1,079	+0.51%
1921	1,146	+0.60%

Year	Pop.	±% p.a.
1926	1,160	+0.24%
1931	1,171	+0.19%
1936	1,111	−1.05%
1946	1,132	+0.19%
1954	1,378	+2.49%
1962	2,059	+5.15%
1968	2,978	+6.34%
1975	4,936	+7.49%
1982	4,720	−0.64%
1990	4,944	+0.58%
1999	4,488	−1.07%
2007	4,308	−0.51%
2012	3,981	−1.57%
2017	4,046	+0.32%
2023	4,139	+0.38%

Source: EHESS and INSEE (1968-2023)

== See also ==
- Communes of the Puy-de-Dôme department
