= Big Think =

Multimedia web portal

- Website type: Web portal
- Creators: Victoria Brown and Peter Hopkins
- Website: BigThink.com
- Launched: 2007; 19 years ago
- Current status: Active

Big Think is a multimedia web portal founded in 2007 by former Charlie Rose show producers Peter Hopkins and Victoria R. Montgomery-Brown. The site publishes interviews and round table discussions with experts from a wide range of fields. Victoria Brown is the acting CEO and Peter Hopkins is the acting president of the company.

== History ==
The company was founded when Brown and Hopkins met while working with Google Video to digitize the VHS archives of The Charlie Rose Show in 2006. They began contemplating how to organize information into "short-form intellectual videos targeting online audiences" and envisioned "an online platform where the world's leading experts could weigh in on current issues".

In 2008, they launched with only video content. The materials involve short clips but with enough content so that they foster thinking, learning, and debate.

In 2009, they branched into blogs and written content. Their first notable blogger was Michio Kaku. Other personalities include Angelina Jolie, who joined a panel of experts in a discourse over displaced children in Iraq, and Esther Dyson who talked about the opportunities from space exploration.

In 2012, Big Think started live-streaming and providing individuals and companies with "real-time interaction with notable guests". The platform also serves as a resource for educators and researchers, facilitating online learning. As of March 2012, the Big Think YouTube channel passed 20 million views, and the video archive of the website included more than 12,000 clips from more than 2000 of its designated experts.

Big Think has created video series on "Courageous Collaborations", "Academic Freedom" and "Education Innovation".

Big Think spun out other sites: Big Think Edge for Business and Floating University for Higher Education.
