= Tilo Jung =

German journalist (born 1985)

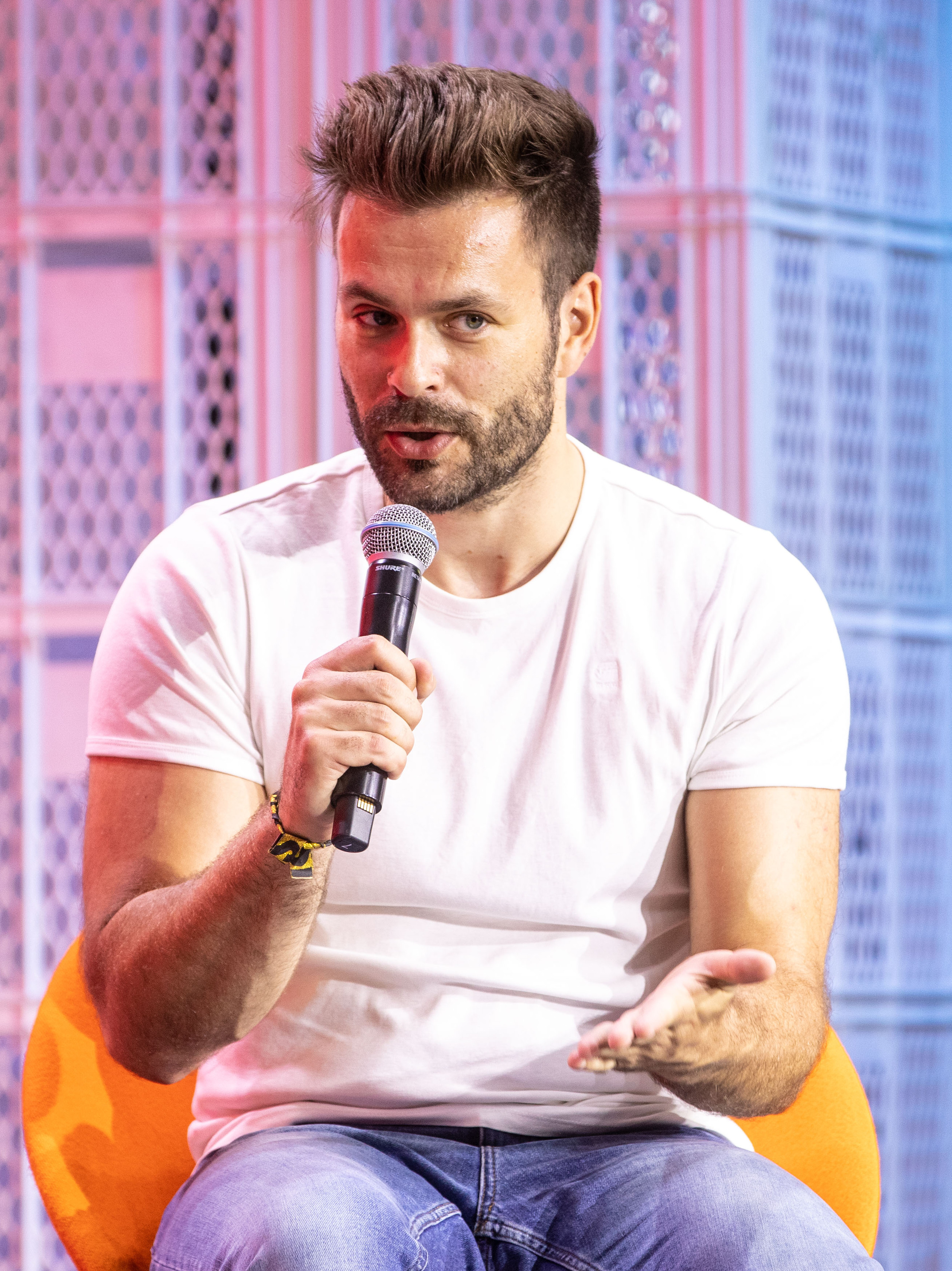
- Jung in 2023
- Born: October 21, 1985 (age 40); Malchin, East Germany
- Occupation: Journalist

Tilo Jung (born October 21, 1985) is a German journalist and editor-in-chief of the political online interview show Jung & Naiv (Young & Naive).

== Life and career ==
At the age of 15, Jung began to contribute as a freelance reporter to the regional daily newspaper Nordkurier on a wide range of topics, including the year he spent as an exchange student at a high school in Texas.

In 2006, he moved to Berlin and was briefly enrolled at Humboldt University to study business and law. After dropping out of university, in 2011, he started his career as a journalist interviewing and editing coverage for the radio show Medienmagazin on radioeins, hosted by Rundfunk Berlin-Brandenburg.

Initially, Jung published uncut interviews on his YouTube channel. The German commercial television station Joiz.Germany began to broadcast episodes of Jung & Naiv six months later, but stopped in November 2014 when the station became insolvent. Notable guests on Jung's show were politicians, journalists and other commentators, including Peer Steinbrück, Jürgen Trittin, Heiko Maas, Jeremy Scahill, Noam Chomsky, and Glenn Greenwald.

In 2015, Jung started to cover the Bundespressekonferenz, a regular press conference of the German government. In mid-April, he began to post shorter, topic-related videos excerpted from his full-length videos on YouTube. He also launched the podcast Aufwachen! with Stefan Schulz, previously a journalist at the national paper Frankfurter Allgemeine Zeitung.

Other journalists and television programs, such as the heute-show and NDR's Zapp Magazin, have interviewed Jung or broadcast segments of his programs. Jung works independently and is supported by his web viewers through crowdfunding.

== Awards ==
- 2014: Grimme Online Award category Best Information
