= Saint-Beauzire, Haute-Loire =

Commune in Auvergne-Rhône-Alpes, France

Saint-Beauzire
- Commune
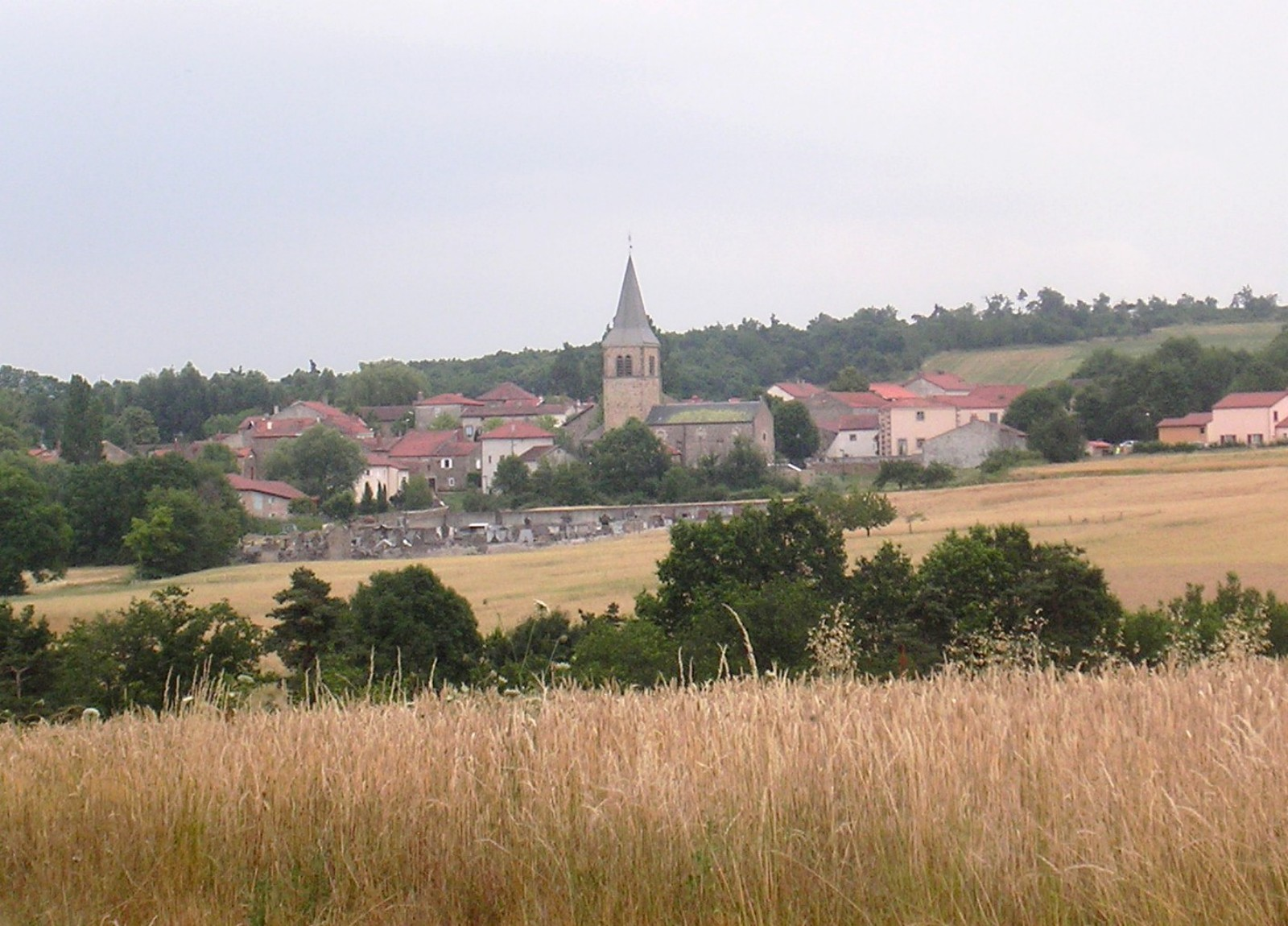
- Location of Saint-Beauzire
- Location within France Location within Auvergne-Rhône-Alpes
- Coordinates: 45°16′33″N 3°16′06″E
- Country: France
- Region: Auvergne-Rhône-Alpes
- Department: Haute-Loire
- Arrondissement: Brioude
- Canton: Pays de Lafayette
- Intercommunality: Brioude Sud Auvergne

Government
  - Mayor (2020–2026): Alain Marchaud
- Area^{1}: 23.46 km^{2} (9.06 sq mi)
- Elevation: 693 m (2,274 ft)
- Highest elevation: 891 m (2,923 ft)
- Lowest elevation: 553 m (1,814 ft)
- Population (2023): 457
  - Density: 19.5/km^{2} (50.5/sq mi)
- Time zone: UTC+01:00 (CET)
  - Summer (DST): UTC+02:00 (CEST)
- INSEE/Postal code: 43170 /43100
- ^{1} French Land Register data, which excludes lakes, ponds, glaciers > 1 km^{2} (0.386 sq mi or 247 acres) and river estuaries.

Saint-Beauzire (French pronunciation: [sɛ̃ boziʁ]; Occitan: Sent Baudeli) is a commune in the Haute-Loire department in south-central France.

== Population ==
Historical population
| Year | Pop. | ±% p.a. |
|---|---|---|
| 1968 | 282 | — |
| 1975 | 249 | −1.76% |
| 1982 | 230 | −1.13% |
| 1990 | 236 | +0.32% |
| 1999 | 271 | +1.55% |
| 2007 | 311 | +1.74% |
| 2012 | 335 | +1.50% |
| 2017 | 415 | +4.38% |
| 2023 | 457 | +1.62% |
Source: INSEE

== See also ==
- Communes of the Haute-Loire department
