= Ministerial Diary Secretary =

Role in the private office of United Kingdom government ministers

The Ministerial Diary Secretary or simply Diary Secretary or Diary Manager is a role in the private office of United Kingdom government ministers. The role involves organising a Minister's calendar of meetings and visits and sometimes arranging associated written briefing from relevant officials. The role is differentiated from (and more junior than) a Private Secretary, who is responsible for policy support to the Minister and management of the Private Office.

Key aspects of the role include:

- Diary management The diary secretary provides a comprehensive diary management service to the Minister. This includes organizing meetings and making travel arrangements when required. They must exercise sound judgment and flexibility when managing potential diary conflicts in a tactful and sensitive manner.
- Coordination and communication Diary Secretaries attend regular meetings to coordinate diaries, agree on priorities, and monitor workloads. They copy the diary and itineraries to everyone who needs to know, ensuring errors and problems are spotted quickly.
- Information management They ensure the Minister is shown all important invitations. The diary secretary also keeps a file on each engagement, recording what was communicated to the Minister and officials, and what was agreed upon.
- Distribution of information The Diary Secretary prepares and circulates a daily diary to relevant individuals, including Ministers, special advisors, the Minister's spouse, and other key personnel.
- Additional support They work as part of the Private Office team, providing support to the wider office through flexible and effective teamwork. This can include supporting the Private Secretary and handling Freedom of Information requests.
- Considerations for the Minister The Diary Secretary should be aware of the pressures on a Minister's time, including Parliament, constituency, political career, family, and departmental duties. They should prioritize invitations and meetings that will help the Minister pursue their policies.
