= Cantons of the Puy-de-Dôme department =

The following is a list of the 31 cantons of the Puy-de-Dôme department, in France, following the French canton reorganisation which came into effect in March 2015:

- Aigueperse
- Ambert
- Aubière
- Beaumont
- Billom
- Brassac-les-Mines
- Cébazat
- Chamalières
- Châtel-Guyon
- Clermont-Ferrand-1
- Clermont-Ferrand-2
- Clermont-Ferrand-3
- Clermont-Ferrand-4
- Clermont-Ferrand-5
- Clermont-Ferrand-6
- Cournon-d'Auvergne
- Gerzat
- Issoire
- Lezoux
- Maringues
- Les Martres-de-Veyre
- Les Monts du Livradois
- Orcines
- Pont-du-Château
- Riom
- Saint-Éloy-les-Mines
- Saint-Georges-de-Mons
- Saint-Ours
- Le Sancy
- Thiers
- Vic-le-Comte
