= Departmental Council of Puy-de-Dôme =

Departmental legislature in France

Departmental Council of Puy-de-Dôme Conseil départemental du Puy-de-Dôme
- Logo of the Council

Leadership
- President: Lionel Chauvin since 1 July 2021

Meeting place
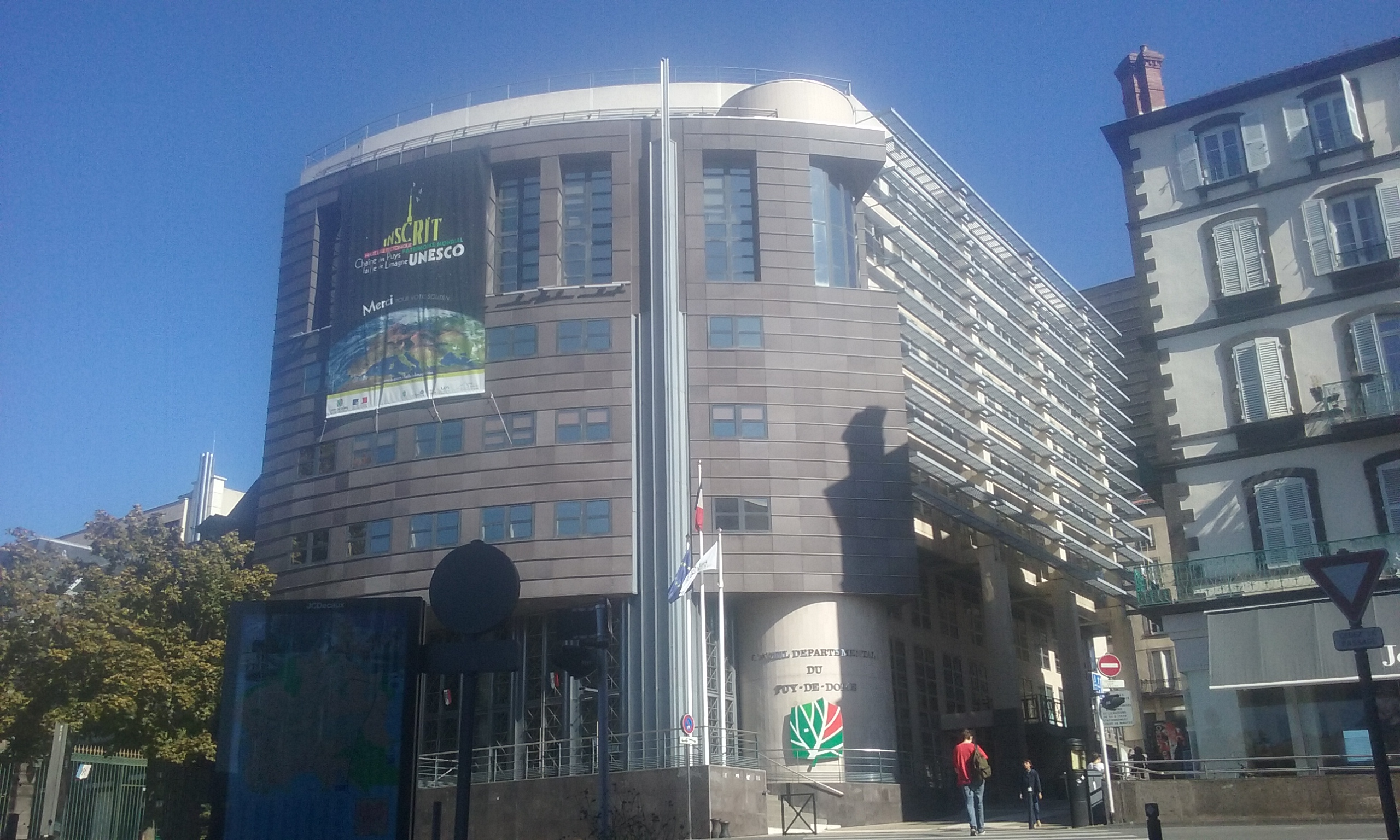
- Conseil départemental du Puy-de-Dôme, Clermont-Ferrand

Website
- www.puy-de-dome.fr

Departmental Council of Puy-de-Dôme (French: Conseil départemental du Puy-de-Dôme) is the deliberative assembly of the French department of Puy-de-Dôme. It consists of 62 members (departmental councilors), elected from the 31 cantons of Puy-de-Dôme and its headquarters are in Clermont-Ferrand, capital of the department.

The departmental councilors are elected for a six-year term.

== Executive ==
=== Presidents ===
The president of the departmental council is Lionel Chauvin (LR).

Period		Name	Party
1848	1849	Bertrand Dorlhac	
1849	1852	Gabriel Moulin	Monarchism
1852	1865	Charles De Morny	Liberal Bonapartist
1865	1870	Eugène Rouher	Authoritarian Bonapartist
1870	1873	Gabriel Moulin	Monarchism
1873	1874	Félix Martha-Beker	SE
1874	1875	Agis-Léon Ledru	SE
1875	1881	Agénor Bardoux	Mod
1881	1888	Mathieu Salneuve	GR
1888	1898	Jean-Baptiste Guyot-Lavaline	FR
1898	1901	Charles Barrière	AD
1901	1908	Edmond Guyot-Dessaigne	PR
1908	1911	Noël Chamerlat	PR
1911	1935	Étienne Clémentel	PR
1935	1941	Eugène Chassaing	PR
1941	1942	François Albert-Buisson	PR
1942	1945	Raymond Grasset	PR
1945	1949	Adrien Mabrut	SFIO
1949	1964	Eugène Chassaing	PR
1964	1970	Gabriel Montpied	PS
1970	1973	Arsène Boulay	PS
1973	1976	Georges Marignier	UDF
1976	1988	Arsène Boulay	PS
1988	1992	Pierre Bouchaudy	PS
1992	1998	Georges Chometon	CDS-UDF
1998	2004	Pierre-Joël Bonté	PS
2004	2021	Jean-Yves Gouttebel	PS (2004-2008)
2004	2021	Jean-Yves Gouttebel	DVG (2008-2013)
2004	2021	Jean-Yves Gouttebel	PRG (2013-2017)
2021	Incumbent	Lionel Chauvin	LR

=== Vice-presidents ===
List of vice-presidents of the departmental council (as of 2021)
No.	Name	Party	Canton (constituency)	Delegation
1	Jean-Paul Cuzin	DVD	Beaumont	General services
2	Martine Bony	DVD	Orcines	People with disabilities
3	Jérôme Gaumet	LR	Saint-Éloy-les-Mines	Finance and public accounts
4	Éléonore Szczepaniak	DVD	Aubière	Youth
5	Jean-Philippe Perret	DVD	Riom	Ecological transition and territorial innovation
6	Isabelle Vallée	DVD	Issoire	Habitat and housing
7	Michel Sauvade	DVC	Ambert	Technology
8	Audrey Manuby	DVD	Saint-Ours	Colleges
9	Pierre Riol	DVD	Aubière	Environment
10	Marie-Anne Marchis	LR	Chamalières	Tourism
11	Bertrand Barraud	LR	Issoire	Relations with local and regional authorities and spatial planning
12	Anne-Marie Picard	LR	Beaumont	Elderly people
13	Sébastien Galpier	LR	Clermont-Ferrand-5	Culture and heritage
14	Stéphanie Flori-Dutour	LR	Riom	Integration and employment

== Composition ==
The Departmental Council consists of 61 departmental councilors (conseillers départementaux) elected from the 30 cantons of Puy-de-Dôme.
