= Aubière =

- Commune
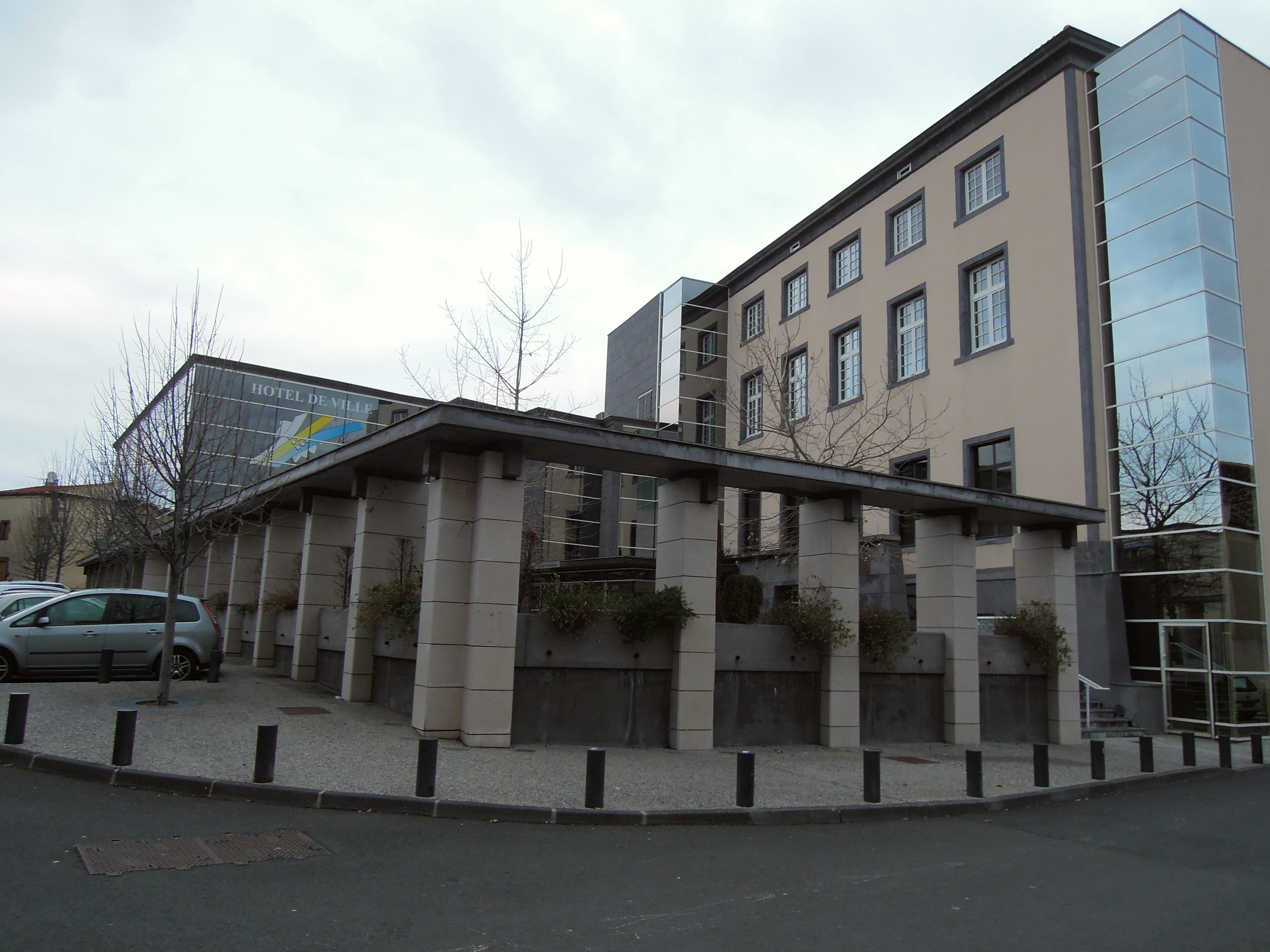
- Town hall

- Coat of arms
- Location of Aubière
- Location within France Location within Auvergne-Rhône-Alpes
- Coordinates: 45°45′06″N 3°06′42″E
- Country: France
- Region: Auvergne-Rhône-Alpes
- Department: Puy-de-Dôme
- Arrondissement: Clermont-Ferrand
- Canton: Aubière
- Intercommunality: Clermont Auvergne Métropole

Government
  - Mayor (2026–32): Sylvain Casildas
- Area^{1}: 7.65 km^{2} (2.95 sq mi)
- Highest elevation: 467 m (1,532 ft)
- Lowest elevation: 343 m (1,125 ft)
- Population (2023): 10,459
  - Density: 1,370/km^{2} (3,540/sq mi)
- Time zone: UTC+01:00 (CET)
  - Summer (DST): UTC+02:00 (CEST)
- INSEE/Postal code: 63014 /63170
- Website: ville-aubiere.fr
- ^{1} French Land Register data, which excludes lakes, ponds, glaciers > 1 km^{2} (0.386 sq mi or 247 acres) and river estuaries.

Aubière (French pronunciation: [objɛʁ]; Auvergnat: Aubèira) is a commune located in the department of Puy-de-Dôme in the Auvergne-Rhône-Alpes region in southeast France. As of 2023 its population was 10,459.

The town is home to the Cézeaux campus of the University of Clermont Auvergne, a substantial number of sports teams, and a large commercial area.

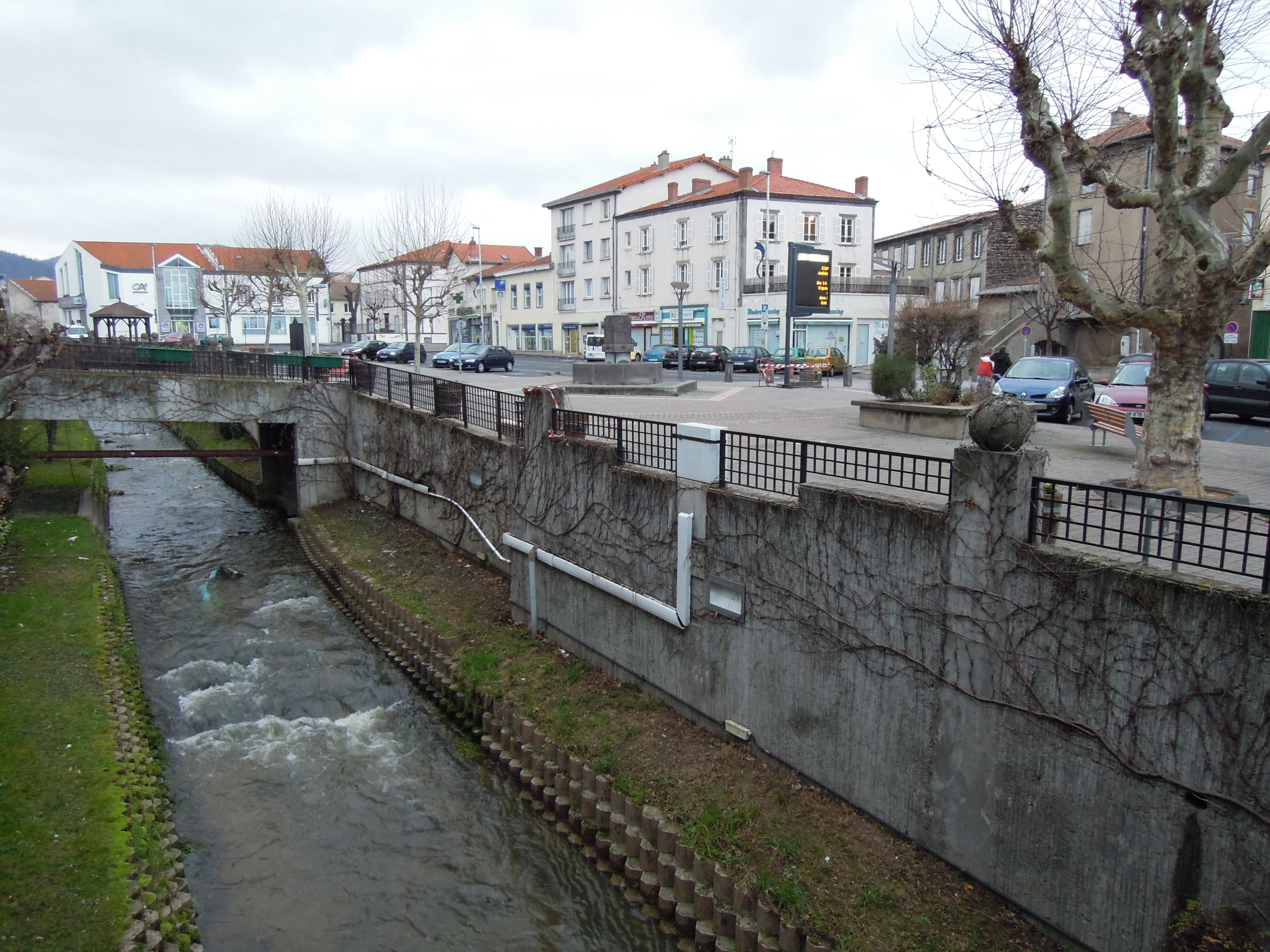
Ramacles Square in Aubière

== Geography ==
=== Location ===
Aubière is located south of Clermont-Ferrand in the heart of the Puy-de-Dôme department, 3.7 km south-east of the city of Clermont-Ferrand. It borders the villages of Beaumont, Romagnat, Pérignat-lès-Sarliève, and Cournon-d’Auvergne.

The Artière river, a tributary of the Allier, flows through the village from west to east. The river, a large part of which is underground, can flood at any moment. The quality of its water deteriorates when it converges with the Gazelle river, one of its tributaries.

=== Transportation ===
==== Roads ====
- A75 autoroute with two exits
- Metropolitan road 2009 (formerly route nationale 9)
- Other metropolitan roads: 21 (towards Romagnat), 69, 212 (towards Cournon-d'Auvergne and Billom), 777, 805

==== Railways ====
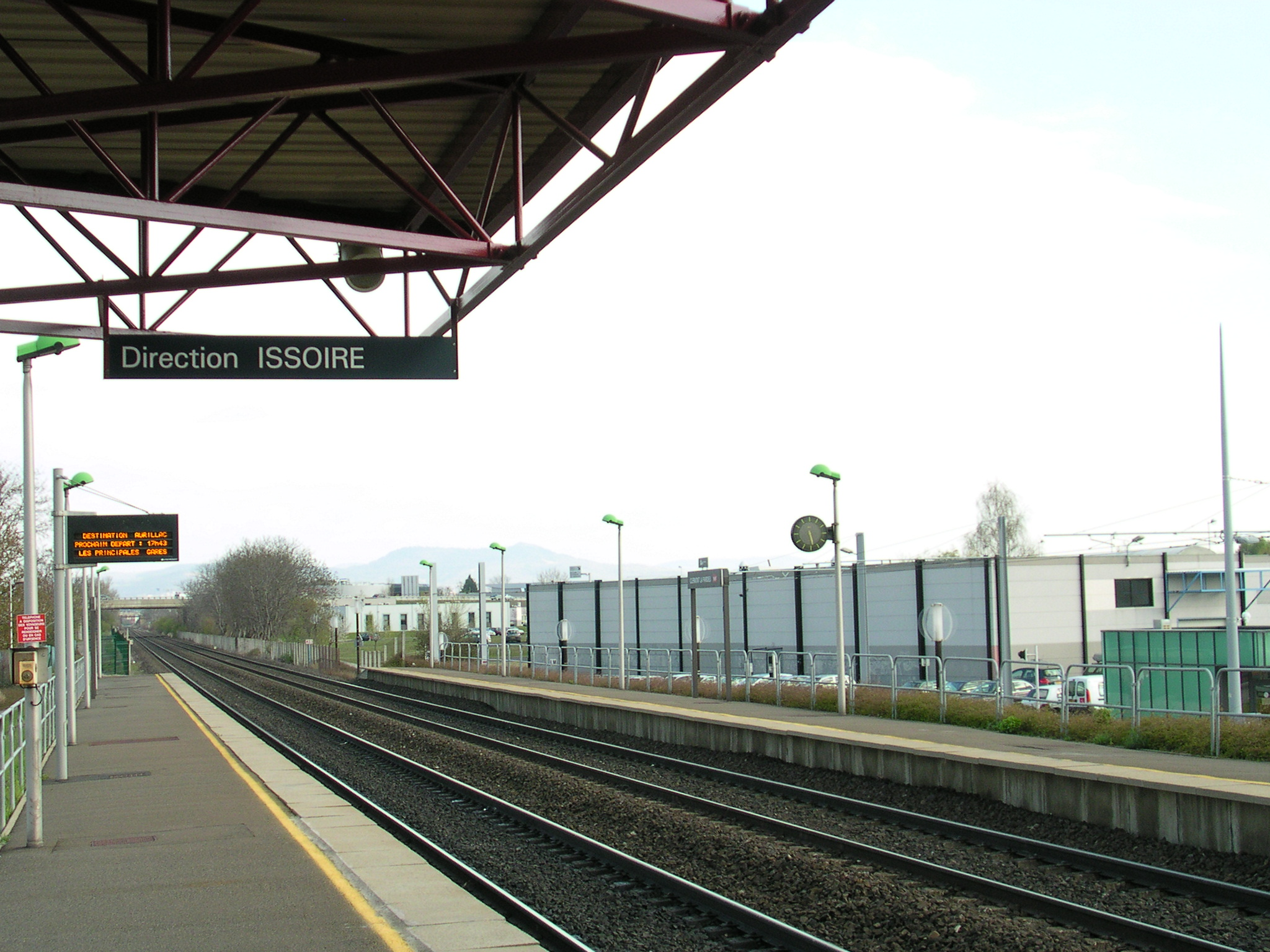
Gare La Pardieu in Clermont-Ferrand

The nearest railway stations are located in the neighbouring commune of Clermont-Ferrand: the Gare de Clermont-Ferrand and the Gare de Clermont-La Pardieu.

==== Public transit ====
Since August 27, 2007, Aubière has contained three stops (Cézeaux Pellez, Campus, and Margeride) of the Clermont-Ferrand tramway. There are four bus lines (3, 12, 13, and 21).

== Town planning ==
A local urban master plan was approved by the municipal council on April 8, 2008.

=== Accommodation ===
As of 2017, the commune numbered 5,862 housing units, compared to 5,196 in 2007. Among these, 90.1% were primary residences, 1.9% secondary residences, and 8.0% vacant residences. 50.2% of the residences were houses and 45.9% apartments. The percentage of primary residences owned by their residents was 48.9%. The percentage of empty HLM (habitation à loyer modéré), or rent-controlled housing, was 10.2%.

== History ==
The earliest traces of the commune date back to the 13th century, when it was within the outer walls of a castle.

Until the end of the 19th century, Aubière featured a sizeable winemaking industry, which ended after the phylloxera epidemic. Proof of that is the fact that most of the houses in the village contain a wine vat, and numerous wine cellars were built on the north and south edges of the Artière valley. Today there is only one wine producer in the village.

The distinctive feature of these wine cellars is that they were constructed above ground because the water that runs under the houses creates a large amount of humidity in the basement. Thus, an urban legend has that people used to speak of going “up to the cellar” rather than “down to the cellar”.

The Aubière Vine and Wine Museum preserves the traditional tools used in winemaking as well as most archival documents. The scope of this museum is not restricted to the village of Aubière, but covers wine produced elsewhere in Auvergne as well.

== Politics and administration ==
=== List of mayors ===
The current mayor is Sylvain Casildas, elected in June 2020.

List of previous mayors of Aubière:

- 1800–1812: Guillaume Girard, notary
- 1812–1827: Louis Voiret, doctor
- 1827–1848: Jean Foulhouze, notary
- 1848–1854: Michel Noëllet dit Lacourtière, farmer
- 1854–1855: François Casière, farmer
- 1855–1867: Pierre Henri Daumas-Foulhouze, notary
- 1867–1870: Martin Gioux-Chatagnier, farmer
- 1870–1874: Michel Roche-Chaduc, farmer
- 1874–1876: François Cassière-Noëllet, farmer
- 1876–1896: Michel Roche-Chaduc, farmer
- 1896–1900: Michel Bourcheix, farmer
- 1900–1912: Francisque Noellet-Roche, farmer
- 1912–1929: Jean Noellet-Degironde
- 1929–1935: Jean Carsac
- 1935–unknown: Eugène Martin
- 1947–1965: Ernest Cristal
- September 1965–September 1982: Georges Digue, doctor
- September 1982–March 1983: Jean Drouin, printer
- March 1983–March 2008: Hubert Tarrérias, pharmacist
- March 2008–July 2020: Christian Sinsard, French Social Security manager
- July 2020–current: Sylvain Casildas

== Population and society ==
Historical population
Year	Pop.	±% p.a.
1968	7,844	—
1975	9,190	+2.29%
1982	8,674	−0.82%
1990	9,106	+0.61%
1999	9,898	+0.93%
2007	10,084	+0.23%
2012	9,536	−1.11%
2017	10,061	+1.08%
2023	10,459	+0.65%
Source: INSEE

=== Cultural events and festivities ===
In spring, the feast of the “Rosière” takes place, a tradition celebrated in numerous villages in France, in which the most beautiful and virtuous girl is crowned “the Rosière”.

In September, the village organizes the Fair of Saint-Loup, in which everyone empties out their attics.

La Rosière's coat of arms

=== Education ===
Aubière is part of the Academy of Clermont-Ferrand, which runs its two public elementary schools, Beaudonnat and Vercingetorix.

The general council of the Puy de Dôme runs the public middle school, Joliot-Curie. All students are educated here by default, with the exception of the residents of the Mirondet district who attend Beaumont Middle School. The school group of Saint-Joseph, consisting of an elementary school and a middle school, is private.

High school students attend either the Lycée Jeanne-d’Arc or the Lycée Blaise-Pascal, both located in Clermont-Ferrand.

There is also the Cézeaux Campus shared by a variety of schools.

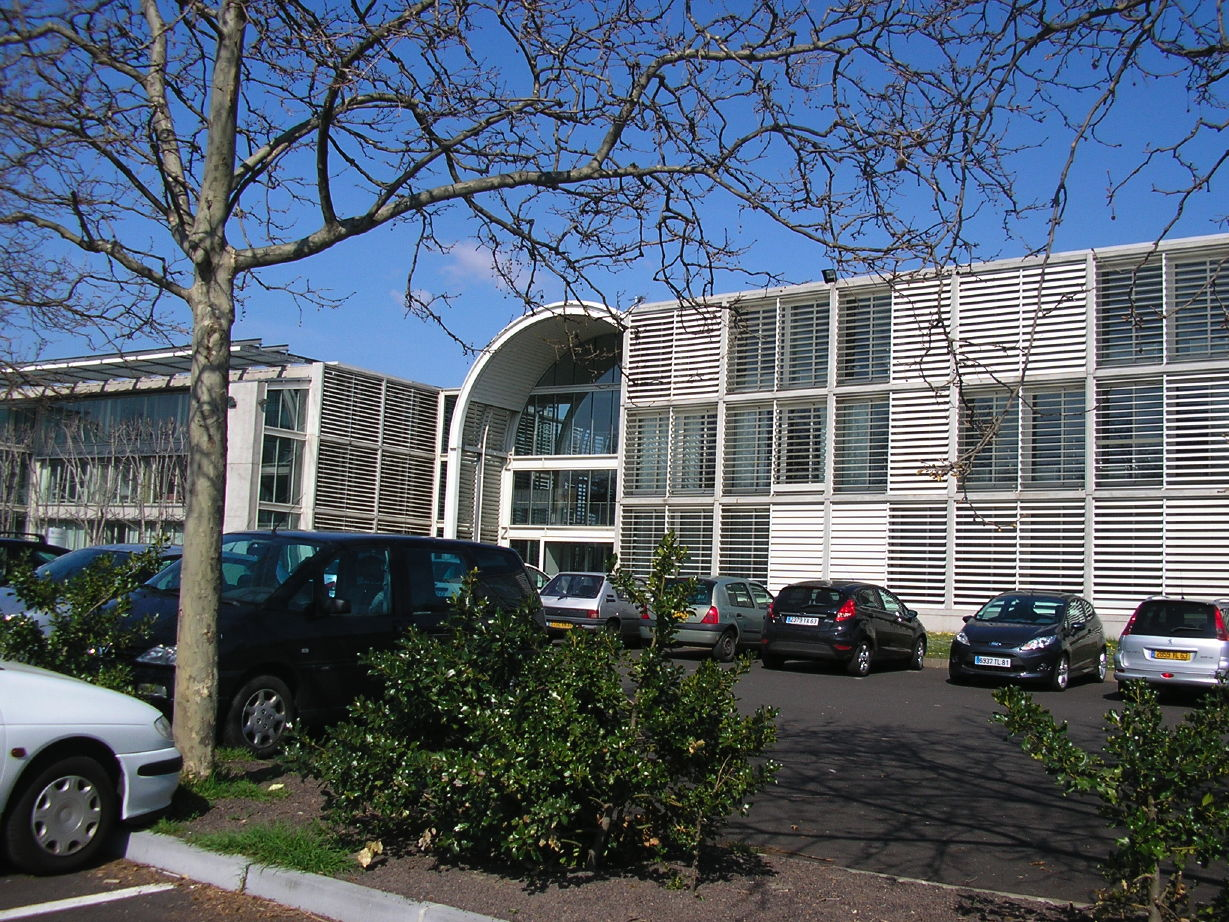
A view of the Cézeaux Campus

=== Social and sportive lifestyle ===
Aubière is home to a soccer team, whose colors, yellow and blue, are those of the village. The team plays in the Beaudonnat stadium. There are also various clubs (basketball, tennis, handball, etc.) and dance associations, a gymnasium for practicing judo and karate, and a track-and-field club. Since 2002, the Jean-Pellez stadium has hosted track-and-field competitions.

== Culture and heritage ==
=== Heraldry ===
D'azur à la fasce d'or (“Azure, a fess Or”)

== See also ==
- Communes of the Puy-de-Dôme department
