= Pierre Pascallon =

French politician (1941–2026)

Deputy of the French National Assembly
- In office 2 April 1993 – 21 April 1997
- Preceded by: Jacques Lavédrine
- Succeeded by: Jean-Paul Bacquet
- Constituency: Puy-de-Dôme's 4th constituency
- In office 2 April 1986 – 14 May 1988
- Constituency: Puy-de-Dôme

Mayor of Issoire
- In office 20 March 1989 – 16 March 2008
- Preceded by: Jacques Lavédrine
- Succeeded by: Jacques Magne

Member of the General Council of Puy-de-Dôme for the Canton of Issoire
- In office 29 March 1992 – 28 March 2004

Personal details
- Born: 12 November 1941 Gap, France
- Died: 5 May 2026 (aged 84) Issoire, France
- Party: RPR; UMP
- Education: Paul Cézanne University (DÉ)
- Occupation: Academic

Pierre Pascallon (French: [pjˈɛʁ paskalˈɔ̃]; 12 November 1941 – 5 May 2026) was a French politician of the Rally for the Republic (RPR) and the Union for French Democracy.

A doctorat d'État holder from Paul Cézanne University, he served as a deputy in the National Assembly from 1986 to 1988 and from 1993 to 1997, where he was a member of the National Defence and Armed Forces Committee. He also served as a General Councillor for the Canton of Issoire from 1992 to 2004 and was mayor of Issoire from 1989 to 2008.

Pascallon died in Issoire on 5 May 2026, at the age of 84.
