= Michèle André =

French politician

Member of the Senate for Puy-de-Dôme
- In office 23 September 2001 – 1 October 2017
- Parliamentary group: SOC

President of the Senate Finance Committee
- In office 7 October 2014 – 1 October 2017
- Preceded by: Philippe Marini
- Succeeded by: Vincent Éblé

Secretary of State in charge of women's rights and the equality opportunity between men and women
- In office 24 June 1988 – 16 May 1991
- President: François Mitterrand
- Prime Minister: Michel Rocard
- Government: Rocard II
- Preceded by: Georgina Dufoix
- Succeeded by: Véronique Neiertz

General Councillor of Puy-de-Dôme
- In office 22 March 1998 – 2 April 2015
- Preceded by: Michel Cornil
- Succeeded by: Constituency abolished
- Constituency: Canton of Clermont-Ferrand-Nord-Ouest
- In office 1 January 1989 – 29 March 1992
- Preceded by: Serge Godard
- Succeeded by: Michel Cornil
- Constituency: Canton of Clermont-Ferrand-Nord-Ouest

Personal details
- Born: 2 February 1947 (age 79) Saint-Jacques-d'Ambur, France
- Party: PS

Michèle André (French pronunciation: [miʃɛl ɑ̃dʁe]; born 6 February 1947) is a French politician and member of the Socialist Party. Director of a public medico-social establishment, she was a Senator for the Puy-de-Dôme department and president of the Senate Finance Committee until October 2017.

== Biography ==
Michèle André was a Secretary of State, in charge of women's rights and the equality of opportunity between men and women, in the 2nd government of Michel Rocard from 23 June 1988 to 15 May 1991.

She was a vice-president in the Senate until 7 October 2008, the renewal date for the Senate executive office. In the role, André was a member of the Constitutional laws, legislation, universal suffrage, regulations and general administration committee.

She was a regional councillor of Auvergne, vice-president of the general council of Puy-de-Dôme, and deputy mayor of Clermont-Ferrand, as well as a member of the Parliamentary office for the evaluation of legislation and the Conseil national de la montagne.

André was a Socialist Senator for the Puy-de-Dôme department from 23 September 2001 to 1 October 2017. Sitting on the Finance Committee, she became its president in 2014 after the Senate was returned to right-wing majority. She was also a member of the Assemblée parlementaire de la Francophonie and president of the France-Croatia inter-parliamentary friendship group and Senate delegation for women's rights and the equality of opportunity between men and women.

=== Other involvements ===
- General councillor of Puy-de-Dôme (Canton of Clermont-Ferrand-Nord-Ouest) from 1989 to 1992 and from 1998 to 2015.
- President of the Association for the Management of Senators' Assistants (AGAS).
- Member of the Masonic order Human Rights, vice-president of the fraternity of parliamentarians in the Senate.
