= Le Cendre =

- Commune
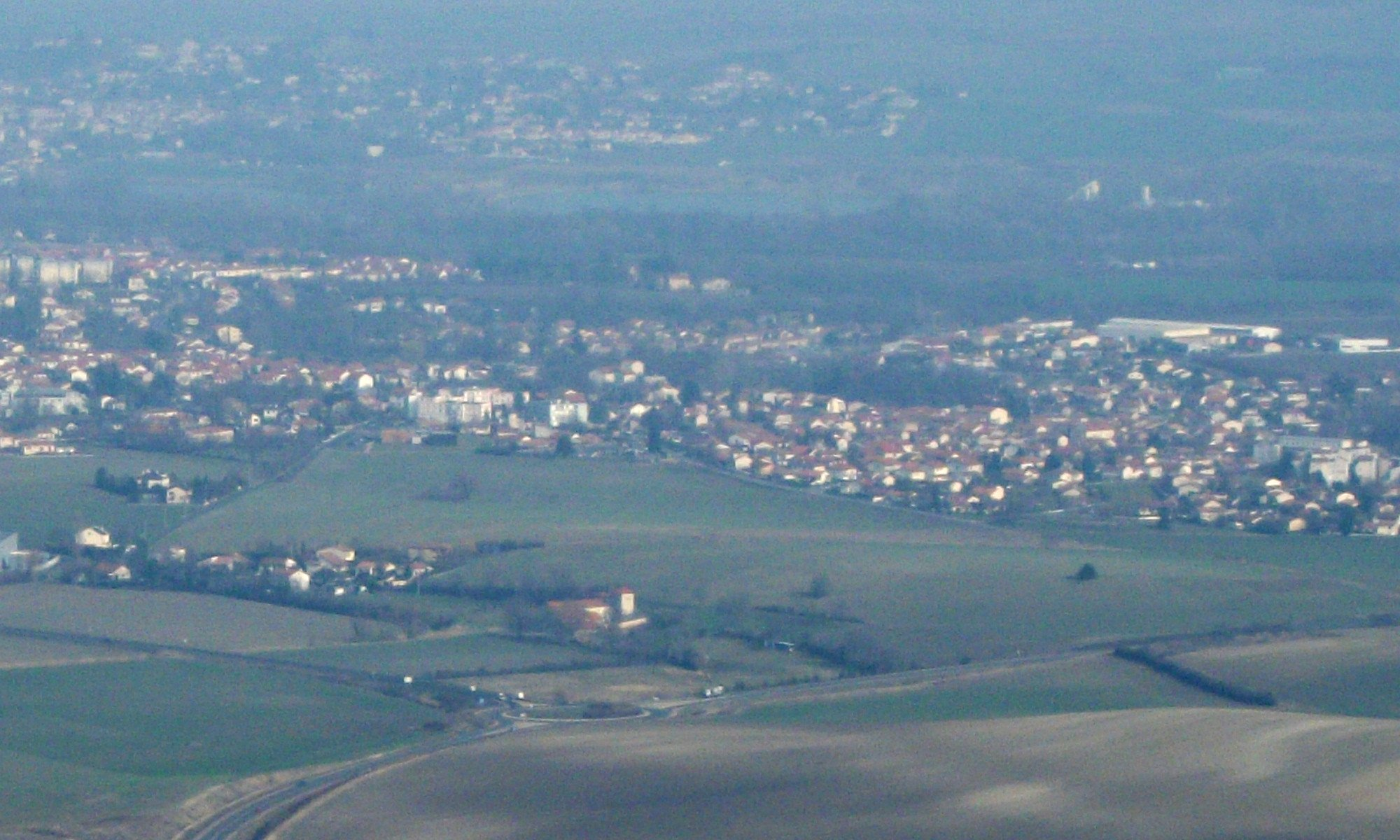
- A general view of Le Cendre

- Coat of arms
- Location of Le Cendre
- Location within France Location within Auvergne-Rhône-Alpes
- Coordinates: 45°43′24″N 3°11′16″E
- Country: France
- Region: Auvergne-Rhône-Alpes
- Department: Puy-de-Dôme
- Arrondissement: Clermont-Ferrand
- Canton: Cournon-d'Auvergne
- Intercommunality: Clermont Auvergne Métropole

Government
  - Mayor (2026–32): Hervé Prononce
- Area^{1}: 4.22 km^{2} (1.63 sq mi)
- Elevation: 350 m (1,150 ft)
- Highest elevation: 411 m (1,348 ft)
- Lowest elevation: 318 m (1,043 ft)
- Population (2023): 5,415
  - Density: 1,280/km^{2} (3,320/sq mi)
- Time zone: UTC+01:00 (CET)
  - Summer (DST): UTC+02:00 (CEST)
- INSEE/Postal code: 63069 /63670
- ^{1} French Land Register data, which excludes lakes, ponds, glaciers > 1 km^{2} (0.386 sq mi or 247 acres) and river estuaries.

Le Cendre (French pronunciation: [lə sɑ̃dʁ]) is a commune in the Puy-de-Dôme department in Auvergne-Rhône-Alpes in central France.

== Population ==
Historical population
Year	Pop.	±% p.a.
1968	1,442	—
1975	2,548	+8.47%
1982	4,114	+7.08%
1990	5,013	+2.50%
1999	4,869	−0.32%
2007	4,676	−0.50%
2012	4,906	+0.96%
2017	5,426	+2.04%
2023	5,415	−0.03%
Source: INSEE

== See also ==
- Communes of the Puy-de-Dôme department
