= Georges Chometon =

French politician (1928–2024)

Georges Chometon (9 November 1928 – 27 September 2024) was a French politician.

== Life and career ==
Georges Chometon was born in Saint-Bonnet-le-Chastel, Puy-de-Dôme on 9 November 1928. His first career was as a butcher.

In 1953, Chometon married Ginette Chometon. The couple had four daughters and celebrated their 60th anniversary in July 2013.

Chometon died in Ambert on 27 September 2024, at the age of 95.

== Offices to which he was elected ==
- Municipal council member in Saint-Bonnet-le-Chastel (Puy-de-Dôme) from 1953
- Assistant mayor Saint-Bonnet-le-Chastel from 1959 to 1971
- Mayor of Saint-Bonnet-le-Chastel from 1971 to 2008
- President of the Communauté de communes du Haut-Livradois from 2002 to 20??
- General Conseiller from Puy-de-Dôme from 1973 to 2004, elected in the (canton de Saint-Germain-l'Herm). He lost on March 28, 2004, to a candidate representing the "various left" (divers gauche) who was 34 years his junior.
- President of the Conseil général du Puy-de-Dôme from 1992 to 1998.
- Representative to the National Assembly from Puy-de-Dôme from March 16, 1986, to June 12, 1988.

== Political allegiance ==
- Union gaulliste (led by René Capitant)
- Mouvement républicain populaire (MRP)
- centriste (center)
- Centre of Social Democrats politicians (CDS) starting in 1978
- President of the CDS departmental federation in 1992
- Union for French Democracy (while a representative 1986-1988)
