= Clermont Auvergne Métropole =

Coordinates: 45.78°N 3.08°E

- Métropole
- Location of the metropolis in the department of Puy-de-Dôme.
- Country: France
- Region: Auvergne-Rhône-Alpes
- Department: Puy-de-Dôme
- No. of communes: {{{nbcomm}}}
- Established: January 2018
- Area: 300.6 km^{2} (116.1 sq mi)
- Population (2018): 294,127
  - Density: 978.5/km^{2} (2,534/sq mi)

Clermont Auvergne Métropole (French pronunciation: [klɛʁmɔ̃ ovɛʁɲ metʁɔpɔl]) is the métropole, an intercommunal structure, centred on the city of Clermont-Ferrand. It is located in the Puy-de-Dôme department, in the Auvergne-Rhône-Alpes region, central France. It was created in January 2018, replacing the communauté urbaine that had replaced the previous communauté d'agglomération Clermont-Communauté in January 2017. Its area is 300.6 km^{2}. Its population was 294,127 in 2018, of which 146,734 in Clermont-Ferrand proper.

== Composition ==
Clermont Auvergne Métropole consists of the following 21 communes:

1. Aubière
2. Aulnat
3. Beaumont
4. Blanzat
5. Cébazat
6. Ceyrat
7. Chamalières
8. Châteaugay
9. Clermont-Ferrand
10. Cournon-d'Auvergne
11. Durtol
12. Gerzat
13. Le Cendre
14. Lempdes
15. Nohanent
16. Orcines
17. Pérignat-lès-Sarliève
18. Pont-du-Château
19. Romagnat
20. Royat
21. Saint-Genès-Champanelle
