= Cébazat =

- Commune
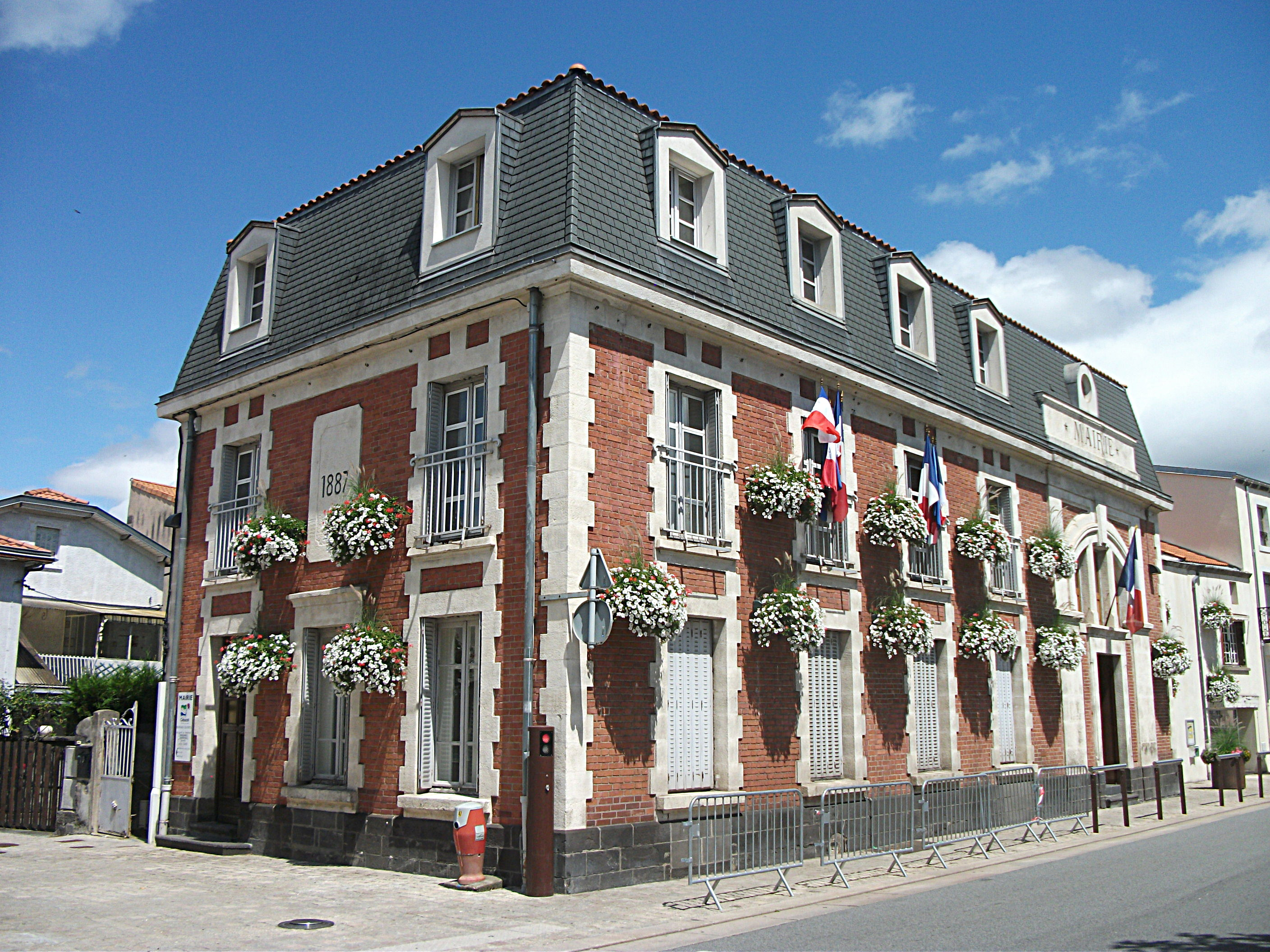
- Town hall

- Coat of arms
- Location of Cébazat
- Location within France Location within Auvergne-Rhône-Alpes
- Coordinates: 45°49′56″N 3°06′02″E
- Country: France
- Region: Auvergne-Rhône-Alpes
- Department: Puy-de-Dôme
- Arrondissement: Clermont-Ferrand
- Canton: Cébazat
- Intercommunality: Clermont Auvergne Métropole

Government
  - Mayor (2026–32): Flavien Neuvy
- Area^{1}: 10.02 km^{2} (3.87 sq mi)
- Highest elevation: 518 m (1,699 ft)
- Lowest elevation: 320 m (1,050 ft)
- Population (2023): 8,953
  - Density: 893.5/km^{2} (2,314/sq mi)
- Demonym: Cébazaire
- Time zone: UTC+01:00 (CET)
  - Summer (DST): UTC+02:00 (CEST)
- INSEE/Postal code: 63063 /63118
- Website: cebazat.fr
- ^{1} French Land Register data, which excludes lakes, ponds, glaciers > 1 km^{2} (0.386 sq mi or 247 acres) and river estuaries.

Cébazat is a commune in the Puy-de-Dôme department in Auvergne-Rhône-Alpes in central France.

== Population ==
Historical population
Year	Pop.	±% p.a.
1968	3,837	—
1975	5,605	+5.56%
1982	6,617	+2.40%
1990	7,562	+1.68%
1999	7,800	+0.34%
2007	7,784	−0.03%
2012	7,407	−0.99%
2017	8,604	+3.04%
2023	8,953	+0.66%
Source: INSEE

== See also ==
- Communes of the Puy-de-Dôme department
