= Blanzat =

- Commune
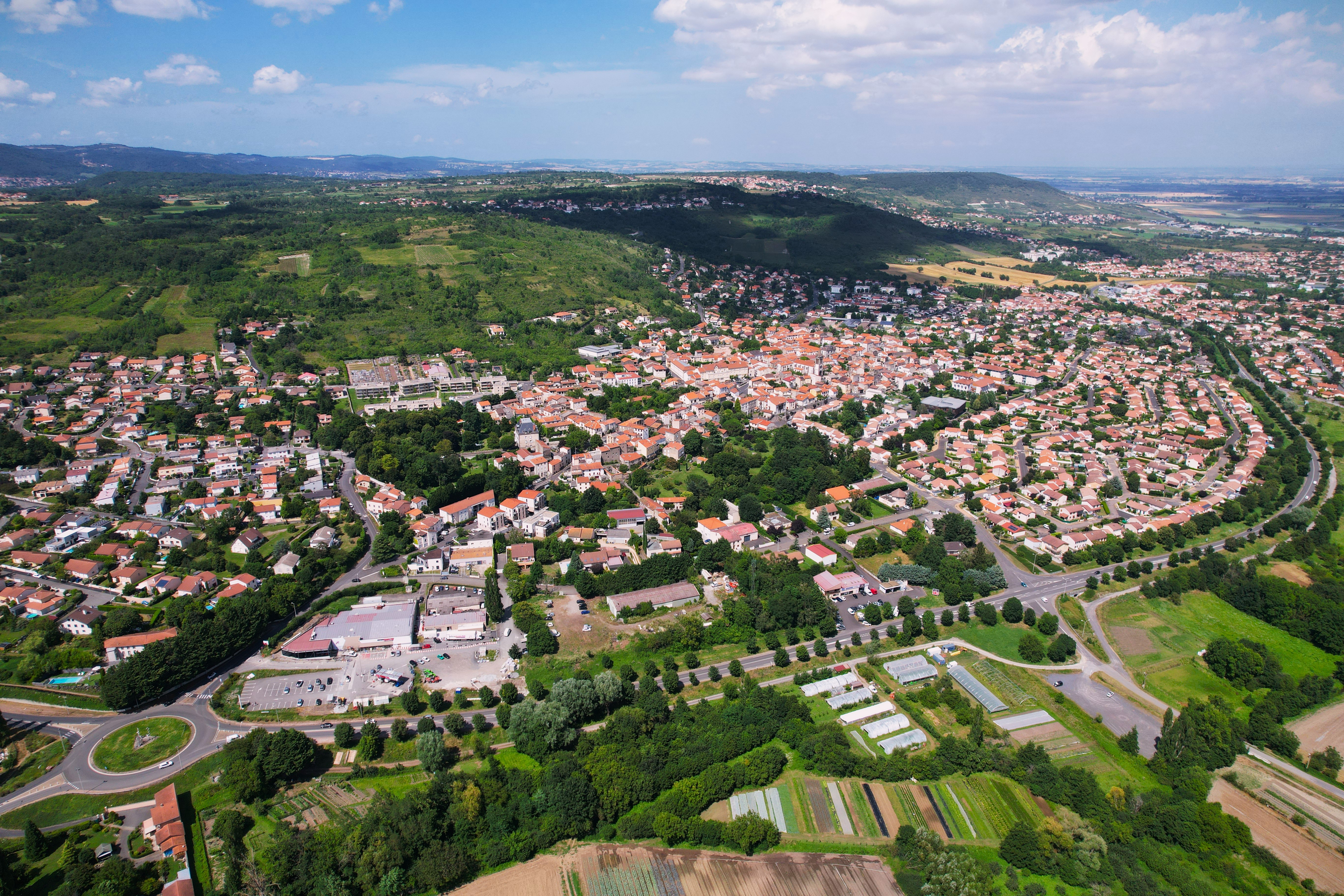
- Aerial view of Blanzat

- Coat of arms
- Location of Blanzat
- Location within France Location within Auvergne-Rhône-Alpes
- Coordinates: 45°49′44″N 3°04′34″E
- Country: France
- Region: Auvergne-Rhône-Alpes
- Department: Puy-de-Dôme
- Arrondissement: Clermont-Ferrand
- Canton: Cébazat
- Intercommunality: Clermont Auvergne Métropole

Government
  - Mayor (2026–32): Richard Bert
- Area^{1}: 6.96 km^{2} (2.69 sq mi)
- Highest elevation: 611 m (2,005 ft)
- Lowest elevation: 360 m (1,180 ft)
- Population (2023): 3,709
  - Density: 533/km^{2} (1,380/sq mi)
- Time zone: UTC+01:00 (CET)
  - Summer (DST): UTC+02:00 (CEST)
- INSEE/Postal code: 63042 /63112
- ^{1} French Land Register data, which excludes lakes, ponds, glaciers > 1 km^{2} (0.386 sq mi or 247 acres) and river estuaries.

Blanzat (French pronunciation: [blɑ̃za]) is a commune in the Puy-de-Dôme department in Auvergne-Rhône-Alpes in central France.

== Geography ==
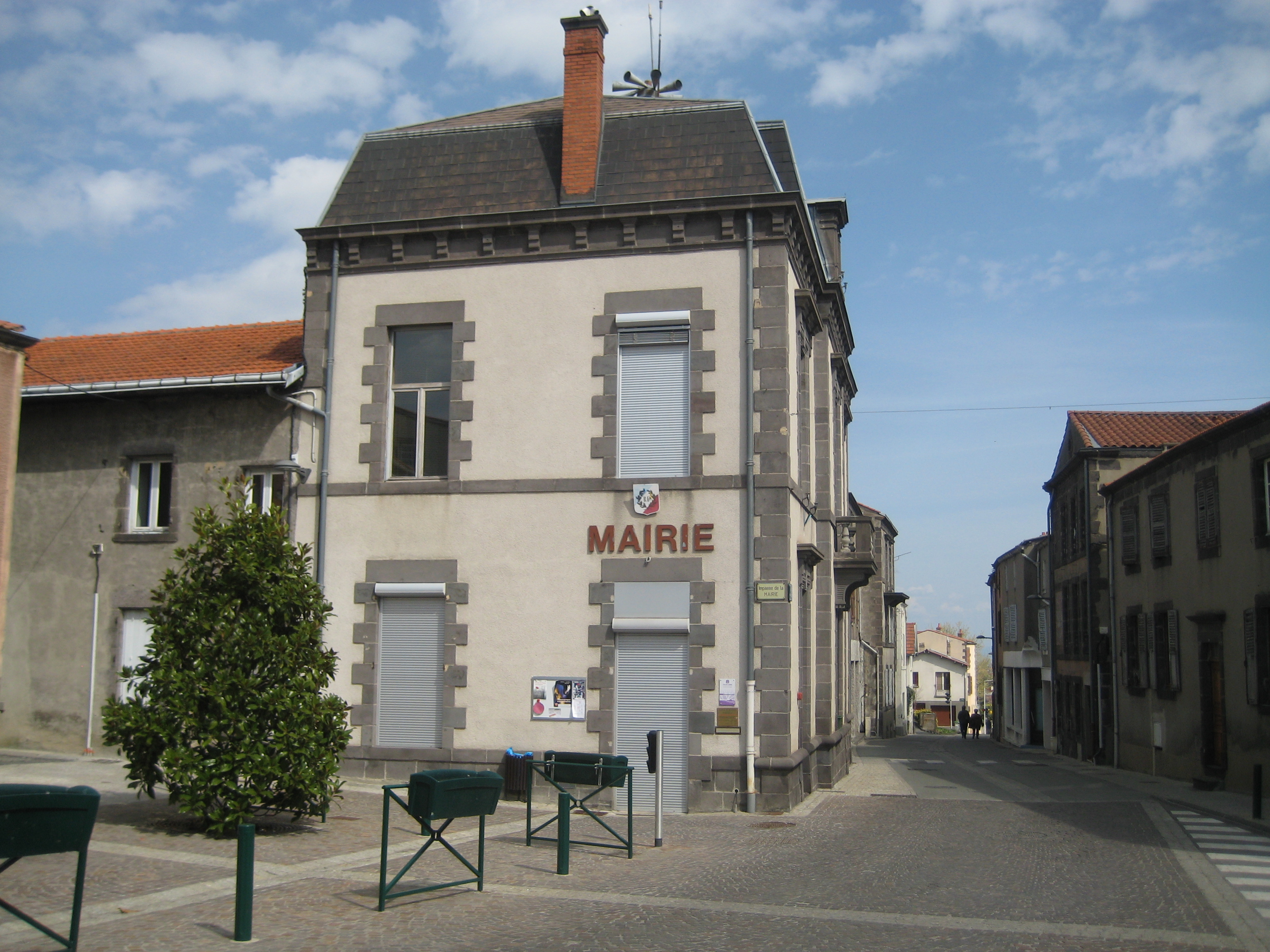
Town hall of Blanzat.

It is located about 8 kilometres (5.0 mi) north of Clermont-Ferrand, within both the former French province of Auvergne and the modern region of Auvergne-Rhône-Alpes.

== Population ==
Historical population

Year	Pop.	±% p.a.
1921	853	—
1936	946	+0.69%
1946	960	+0.15%
1962	1,176	+1.28%
1968	1,696	+6.29%
1975	2,277	+4.30%
1982	3,566	+6.62%

Year	Pop.	±% p.a.
1990	3,522	−0.16%
1999	3,918	+1.19%
2007	3,906	−0.04%
2012	3,778	−0.66%
2017	3,749	−0.15%
2023	3,709	−0.18%

Source: EHESS and INSEE

== See also ==
- Communes of the Puy-de-Dôme department
