= Daniel Vernet =

French journalist (1945–2018)

- Born: 21 May 1945; Chamalières, Puy-de-Dôme, France
- Died: 15 February 2018 (aged 72); Paris, France
- Occupation: Journalist
- Spouse: Marie-Thérèse Vernet
- Children: 1 daughter

Daniel Vernet (21 May 1945 – 15 February 2018) was a French journalist. He was the editor-in-chief of Le Monde, France's centre-left newspaper of record, from 1989 to 1991, and the author of several bools.

== Early life ==
Daniel Vernet was born circa 1945 in Chamalières, Puy-de-Dôme, France.

== Career ==
Vernet began his career as a journalist for La Montagne. He joined Le Monde, where he was the foreign correspondent in Bonn, West Germany from 1973 to 1977), in Moscow, Soviet Union from 1977 to 1981, and in London, U.K. from 1981 to 1983. He was the editor-in-chief of Le Monde from 1985 to 1991, and he retired in 2009. He later wrote for Slate.

Vernet was the author of several books about the Soviet Union, Germany, the Yugoslav Wars and the neoconservative influence on U.S. foreign policy.

== Personal life and death ==
Vernet had a wife, Marie-Thérèse, and a daughter. He died of a heart attack on 15 February 2018.

== Works ==
- Vernet, Daniel (1990). URSS. Paris: Seuil. ISBN 9782020103725. OCLC 729617183.
- Vernet, Daniel (1992). La Renaissance allemande. Paris: Flammarion. ISBN 9782080666390. OCLC 803253241.
- Gonin, Jean-Marc; Vernet, Daniel (1995). Le Rêve sacrifié : Chronique des guerres yougoslaves. Paris: Editions Odile Jacob. ISBN 9782738102720. OCLC 904983418.
- Frachon, Alain; Vernet, Daniel (2004). L'Amérique messianique : Les Guerres des néo-conservateurs. Paris: Le Seuil. ISBN 9782020631570. OCLC 645844043.
- Vernet, Daniel (2005). Le Roman de Berlin. Monaco: Editions du Rocher. ISBN 9782268055091. OCLC 61666401.
