= Durtol =

- Commune
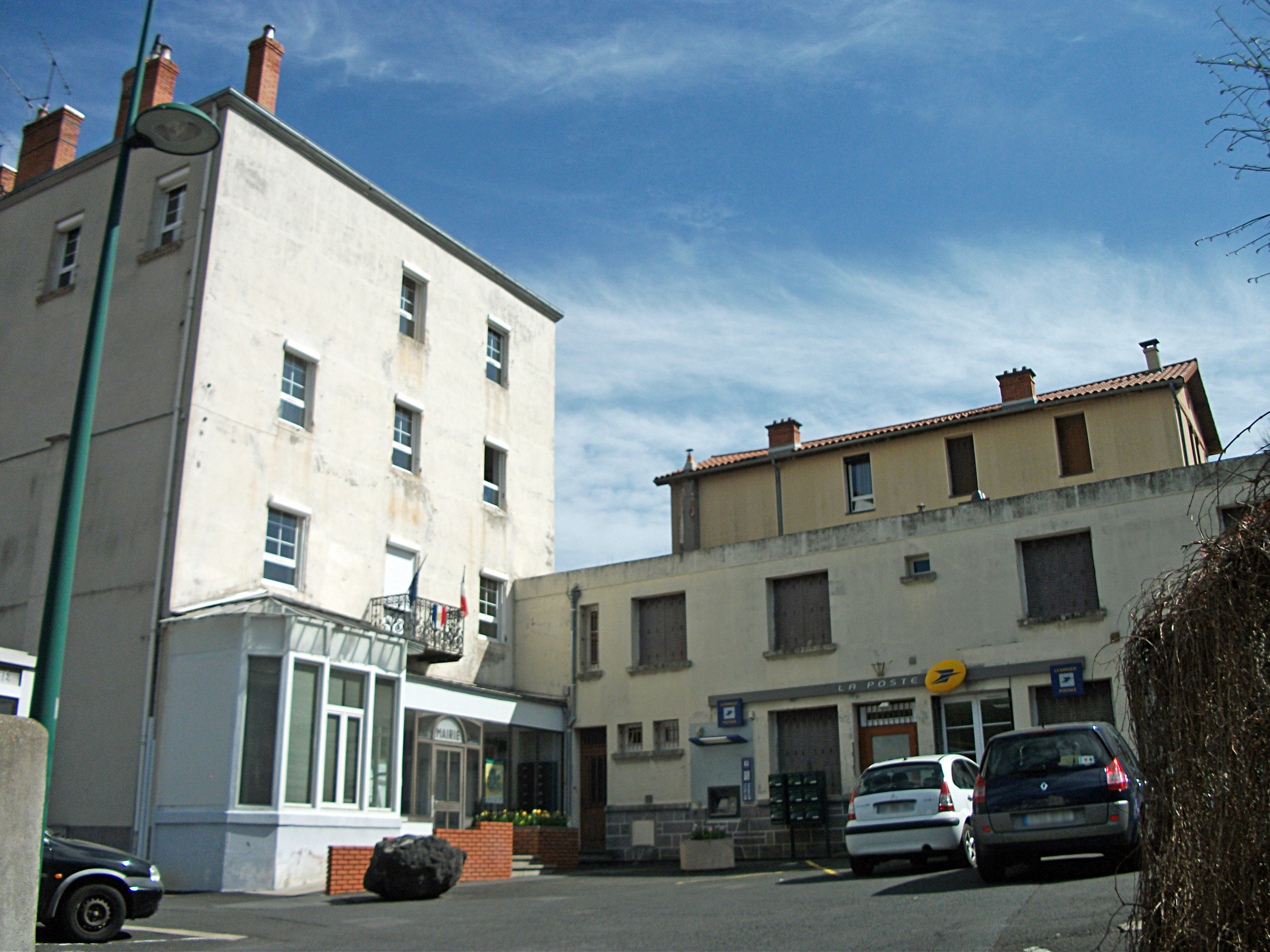
- Town hall and post office

- Coat of arms
- Location of Durtol
- Location within France Location within Auvergne-Rhône-Alpes
- Coordinates: 45°47′50″N 3°03′08″E
- Country: France
- Region: Auvergne-Rhône-Alpes
- Department: Puy-de-Dôme
- Arrondissement: Clermont-Ferrand
- Canton: Cébazat
- Intercommunality: Clermont Auvergne Métropole

Government
  - Mayor (2026–32): François Carmier
- Area^{1}: 4.01 km^{2} (1.55 sq mi)
- Highest elevation: 708 m (2,323 ft)
- Lowest elevation: 468 m (1,535 ft)
- Population (2023): 1,914
  - Density: 477/km^{2} (1,240/sq mi)
- Time zone: UTC+01:00 (CET)
  - Summer (DST): UTC+02:00 (CEST)
- INSEE/Postal code: 63141 /63830
- ^{1} French Land Register data, which excludes lakes, ponds, glaciers > 1 km^{2} (0.386 sq mi or 247 acres) and river estuaries.

Durtol (French pronunciation: [dyʁtɔl]) is a commune in the Puy-de-Dôme department in Auvergne in central France.

== Population ==
Historical population
| Year | Pop. | ±% p.a. |
|---|---|---|
| 1968 | 1,259 | — |
| 1975 | 2,139 | +7.87% |
| 1982 | 2,197 | +0.38% |
| 1990 | 2,004 | −1.14% |
| 1999 | 2,026 | +0.12% |
| 2007 | 1,961 | −0.41% |
| 2012 | 2,009 | +0.48% |
| 2017 | 2,015 | +0.06% |
| 2023 | 1,914 | −0.85% |
Source: INSEE

== See also ==
- Communes of the Puy-de-Dôme department
