= Sayat, Puy-de-Dôme =

Sayat
- Commune
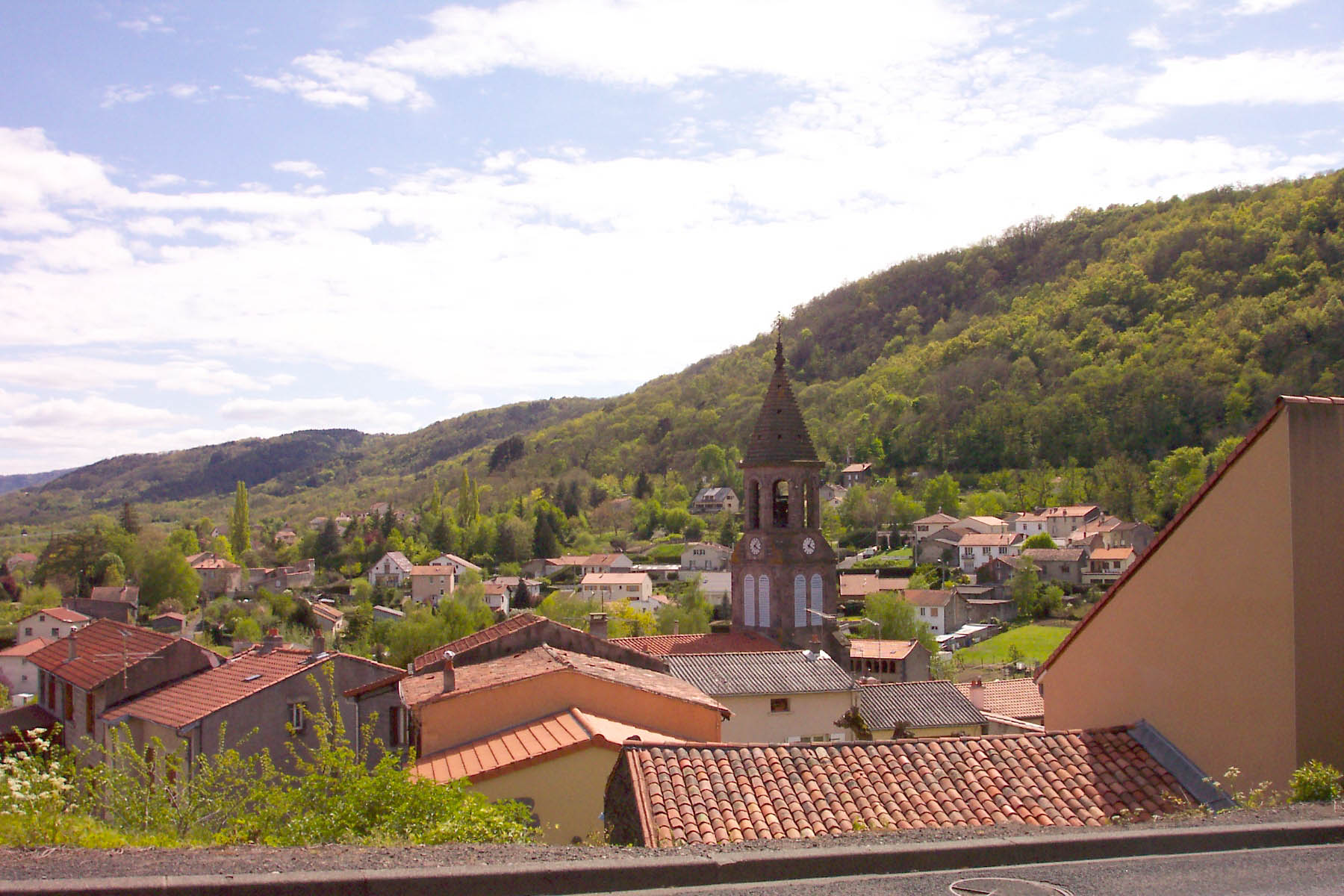
- View of Sayat in 2004

- Coat of arms
- Location of Sayat
- Location within France Location within Auvergne-Rhône-Alpes
- Coordinates: 45°49′38″N 3°03′12″E
- Country: France
- Region: Auvergne-Rhône-Alpes
- Department: Puy-de-Dôme
- Arrondissement: Riom
- Canton: Cébazat
- Intercommunality: CA Riom Limagne et Volcans

Government
  - Mayor (2020–2026): Nicolas Weinmeister
- Area^{1}: 8.29 km^{2} (3.20 sq mi)
- Elevation: 440 m (1,440 ft)
- Highest elevation: 818 m (2,684 ft)
- Lowest elevation: 390 m (1,280 ft)
- Population (2023): 2,529
  - Density: 305/km^{2} (790/sq mi)
- Time zone: UTC+01:00 (CET)
  - Summer (DST): UTC+02:00 (CEST)
- INSEE/Postal code: 63417 /63530
- ^{1} French Land Register data, which excludes lakes, ponds, glaciers > 1 km^{2} (0.386 sq mi or 247 acres) and river estuaries.

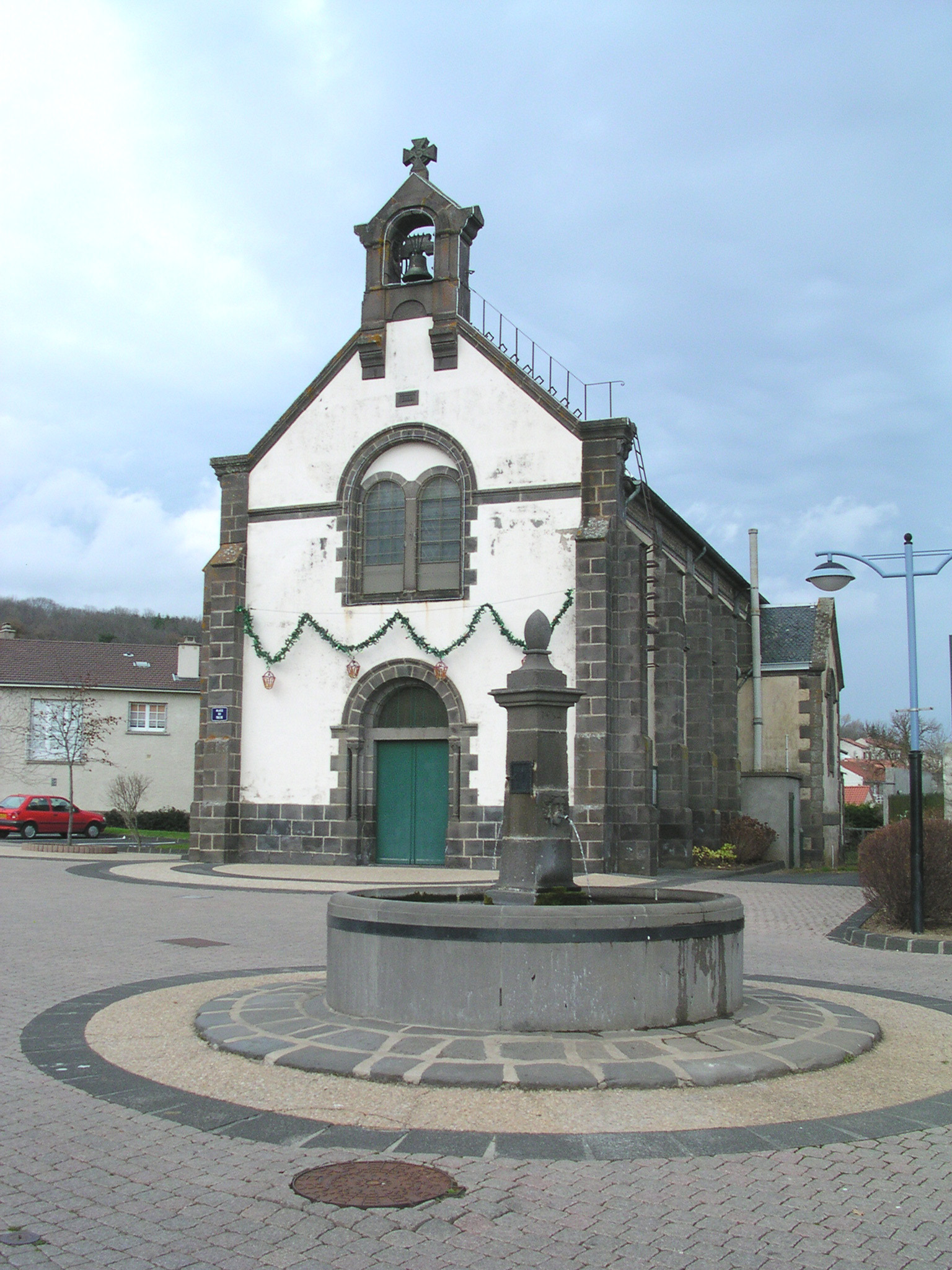
Façade of the village church in Argnat topped by a bell-gable

Sayat (French pronunciation: [saja]) is a commune in the Puy-de-Dôme department in Auvergne in central France.

== Geography ==
Sayat is situated northwest of Clermont-Ferrand. The commune consists of the villages Sayat, Argnat and Le Mas d'Argnat.

== Population ==
Historical population
Year	Pop.	±% p.a.
1968	1,215	—
1975	1,733	+5.20%
1982	1,996	+2.04%
1990	2,208	+1.27%
1999	2,256	+0.24%
2007	2,270	+0.08%
2012	2,155	−1.03%
2017	2,344	+1.70%
2023	2,529	+1.27%
Source: INSEE

== See also ==
- Communes of the Puy-de-Dôme department
