= Nohanent =

- Commune
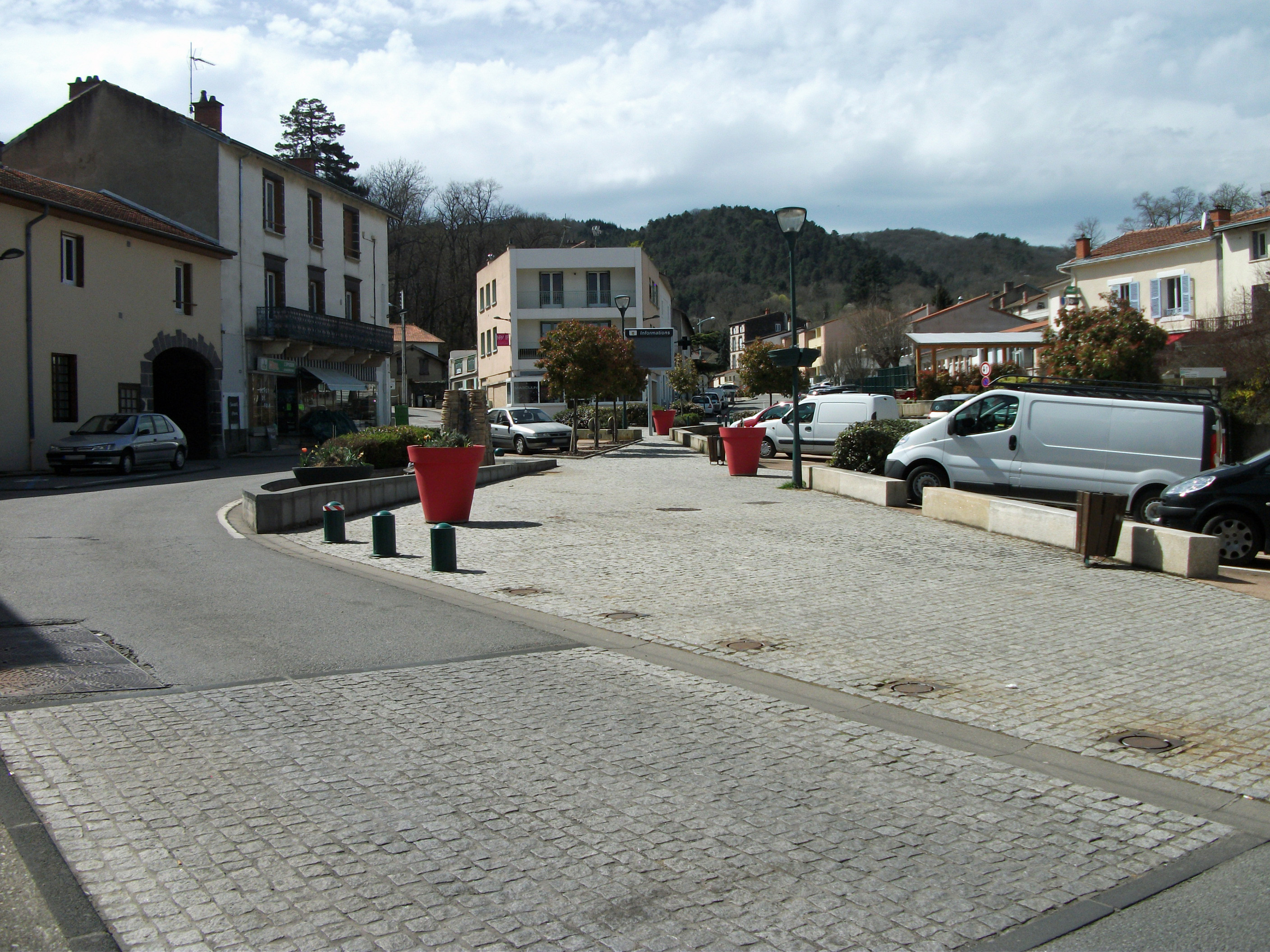
- "Place de la Farge" square

- Coat of arms
- Location of Nohanent
- Location within France Location within Auvergne-Rhône-Alpes
- Coordinates: 45°48′31″N 3°03′20″E
- Country: France
- Region: Auvergne-Rhône-Alpes
- Department: Puy-de-Dôme
- Arrondissement: Clermont-Ferrand
- Canton: Cébazat
- Intercommunality: Clermont Auvergne Métropole

Government
  - Mayor (2020–2026): Laurent Ganet
- Area^{1}: 4.2 km^{2} (1.6 sq mi)
- Elevation: 500 m (1,600 ft)
- Highest elevation: 634 m (2,080 ft)
- Lowest elevation: 385 m (1,263 ft)
- Population (2023): 2,203
  - Density: 520/km^{2} (1,400/sq mi)
- Time zone: UTC+01:00 (CET)
  - Summer (DST): UTC+02:00 (CEST)
- INSEE/Postal code: 63254 /63830
- Website: ville-nohanent.fr
- ^{1} French Land Register data, which excludes lakes, ponds, glaciers > 1 km^{2} (0.386 sq mi or 247 acres) and river estuaries.

Nohanent (French pronunciation: [nonɑ̃]; Occitan: Nonenc [nuˈnɛ̃]) is a commune in the Puy-de-Dôme department in Auvergne-Rhône-Alpes in central France.

== Population ==
Historical population
Year	Pop.	±% p.a.
1968	1,096	—
1975	1,452	+4.10%
1982	1,595	+1.35%
1990	1,791	+1.46%
1999	1,796	+0.03%
2007	1,867	+0.49%
2012	2,025	+1.64%
2017	2,225	+1.90%
2023	2,203	−0.17%
Source: INSEE

== See also ==
- Communes of the Puy-de-Dôme department
