= Saint-Genès-Champanelle =

- Commune
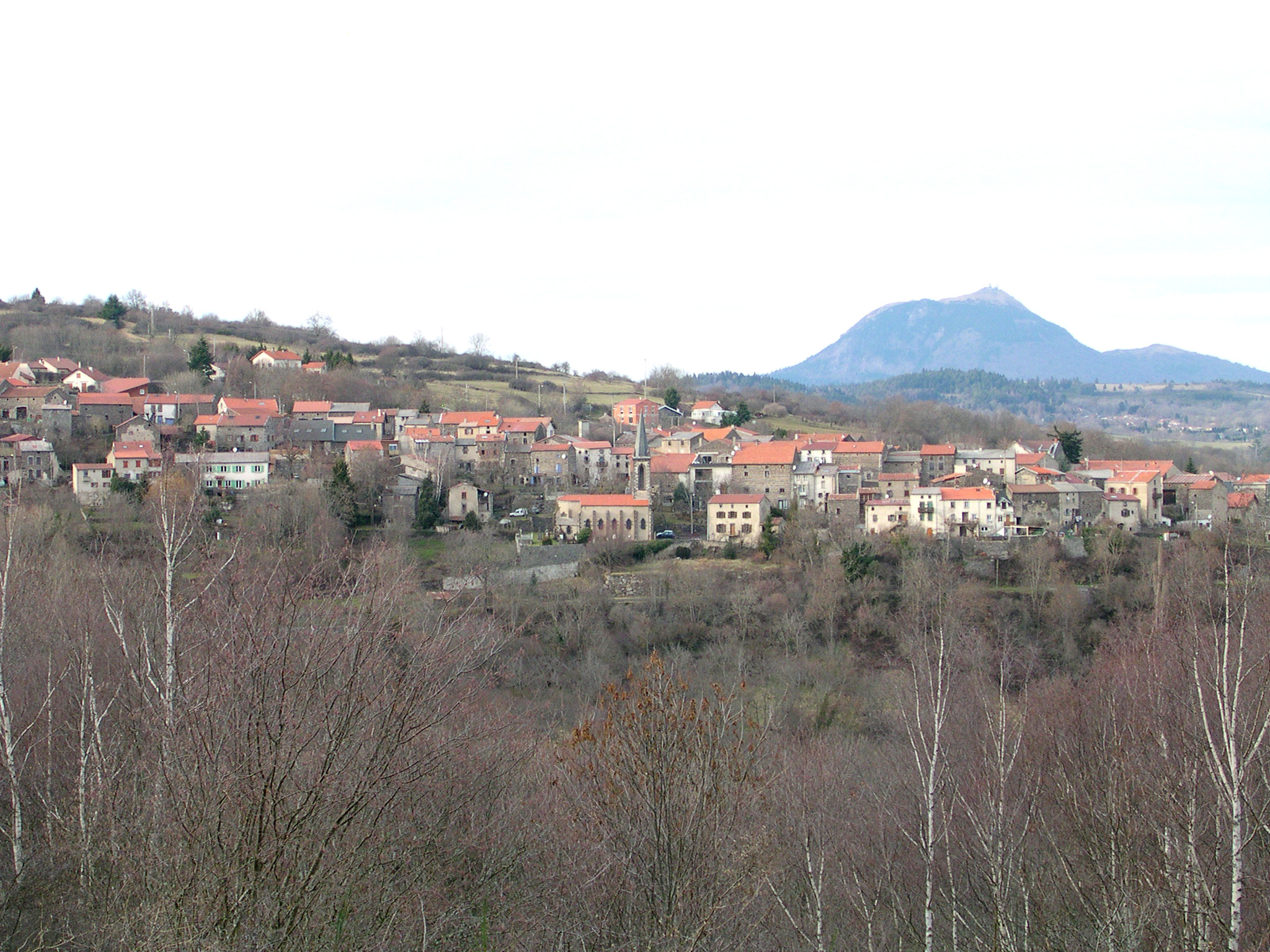
- A general view of Nadaillat

- Coat of arms
- Location of Saint-Genès-Champanelle
- Location within France Location within Auvergne-Rhône-Alpes
- Coordinates: 45°43′16″N 3°01′08″E
- Country: France
- Region: Auvergne-Rhône-Alpes
- Department: Puy-de-Dôme
- Arrondissement: Clermont-Ferrand
- Canton: Beaumont
- Intercommunality: Clermont Auvergne Métropole

Government
  - Mayor (2026–32): Christophe Vial
- Area^{1}: 51.58 km^{2} (19.92 sq mi)
- Elevation: 887 m (2,910 ft)
- Highest elevation: 1,252 m (4,108 ft)
- Lowest elevation: 660 m (2,170 ft)
- Population (2023): 4,066
  - Density: 78.83/km^{2} (204.2/sq mi)
- Time zone: UTC+01:00 (CET)
  - Summer (DST): UTC+02:00 (CEST)
- INSEE/Postal code: 63345 /63122
- ^{1} French Land Register data, which excludes lakes, ponds, glaciers > 1 km^{2} (0.386 sq mi or 247 acres) and river estuaries.

Saint-Genès-Champanelle (French pronunciation: [sɛ̃ ʒənɛ ʃɑ̃panɛl]; Occitan: Sent Genèst de Champanela) is a commune in the Puy-de-Dôme department in Auvergne in central France.

== Population ==
Historical population
| Year | Pop. | ±% p.a. |
|---|---|---|
| 1968 | 1,406 | — |
| 1975 | 1,592 | +1.79% |
| 1982 | 2,008 | +3.37% |
| 1990 | 2,465 | +2.60% |
| 1999 | 2,688 | +0.97% |
| 2007 | 3,044 | +1.57% |
| 2012 | 3,277 | +1.49% |
| 2017 | 3,612 | +1.97% |
| 2023 | 4,066 | +1.99% |
Source: INSEE

== See also ==
- Communes of the Puy-de-Dôme department
