= Saint-Bonnet-le-Chastel =

- Commune
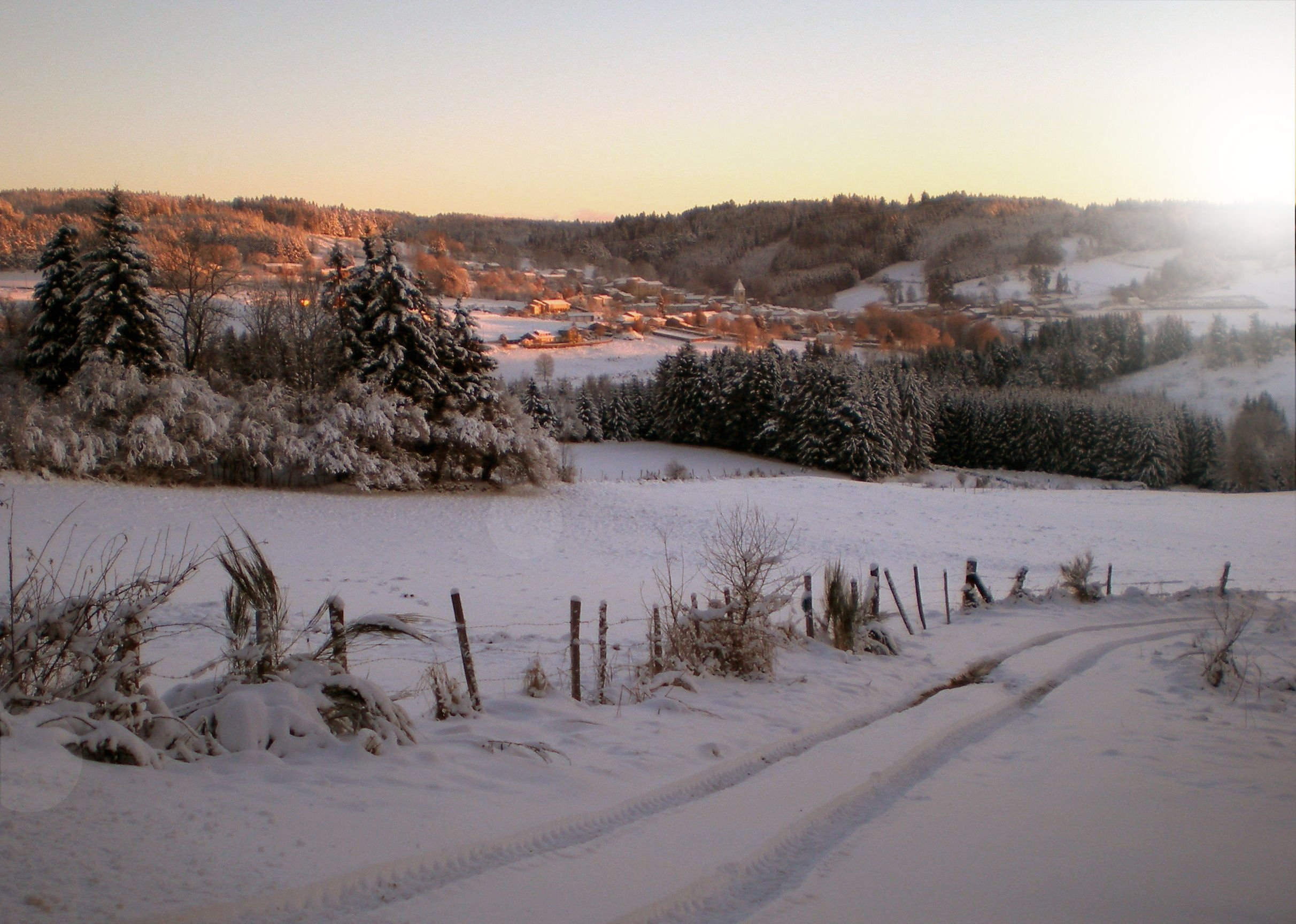
- A general view of Saint-Bonnet-le-Chastel

- Coat of arms
- Location of Saint-Bonnet-le-Chastel
- Location within France Location within Auvergne-Rhône-Alpes
- Coordinates: 45°27′04″N 3°38′02″E
- Country: France
- Region: Auvergne-Rhône-Alpes
- Department: Puy-de-Dôme
- Arrondissement: Ambert
- Canton: Les Monts du Livradois

Government
  - Mayor (2026–32): Simon Rodier
- Area^{1}: 23.47 km^{2} (9.06 sq mi)
- Elevation: 860 m (2,820 ft)
- Highest elevation: 1,122 m (3,681 ft)
- Lowest elevation: 653 m (2,142 ft)
- Population (2023): 211
  - Density: 8.99/km^{2} (23.3/sq mi)
- Time zone: UTC+01:00 (CET)
  - Summer (DST): UTC+02:00 (CEST)
- INSEE/Postal code: 63324 /63630
- ^{1} French Land Register data, which excludes lakes, ponds, glaciers > 1 km^{2} (0.386 sq mi or 247 acres) and river estuaries.

Saint-Bonnet-le-Chastel (French pronunciation: [sɛ̃ bɔnɛ lə ʃastɛl]; Auvergnat: Sant Bonet dau Chastèl) is a commune in the Puy-de-Dôme department in Auvergne in central France.

== See also ==
- Communes of the Puy-de-Dôme department
