= Canton of Cébazat =

Coordinates: 45.83°N 3.10°E

The canton of Cébazat is an administrative division of the Puy-de-Dôme department, central France. It was created at the French canton reorganisation which came into effect in March 2015. Its seat is in Cébazat.

It consists of the following communes:

1. Blanzat
2. Cébazat
3. Durtol
4. Nohanent
5. Sayat
