= Arrondissements of the Puy-de-Dôme department =

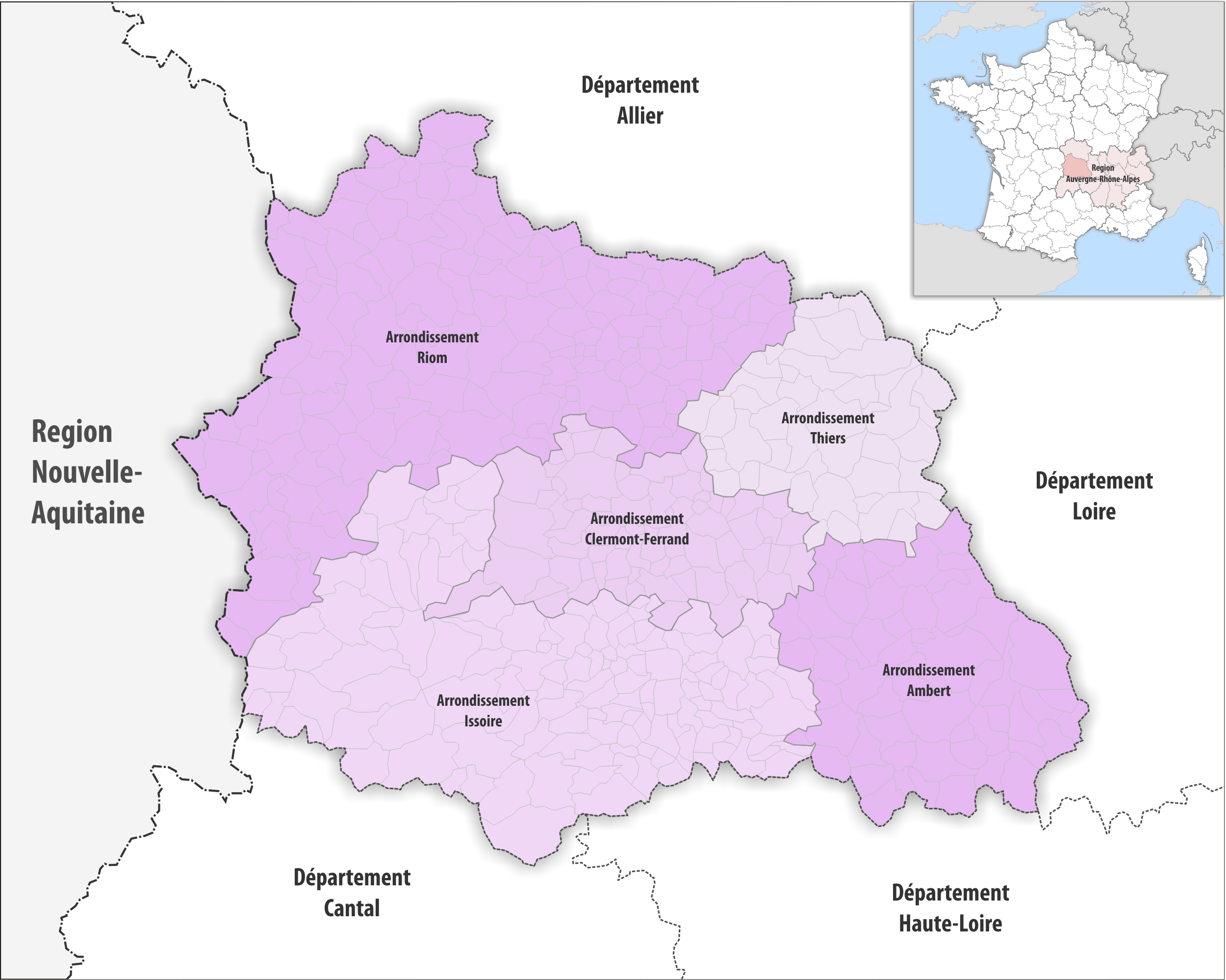
Map of arrondissements of the Puy-de-Dôme department.

The 5 arrondissements of the Puy-de-Dôme department are:

1. Arrondissement of Ambert, (subprefecture: Ambert) with 58 communes. The population of the arrondissement was 27,571 in 2021.
2. Arrondissement of Clermont-Ferrand, (prefecture of the Puy-de-Dôme department: Clermont-Ferrand) with 74 communes. The population of the arrondissement was 362,578 in 2021.
3. Arrondissement of Issoire, (subprefecture: Issoire) with 134 communes. The population of the arrondissement was 78,742 in 2021.
4. Arrondissement of Riom, (subprefecture: Riom) with 155 communes. The population of the arrondissement was 137,149 in 2021.
5. Arrondissement of Thiers, (subprefecture: Thiers) with 44 communes. The population of the arrondissement was 56,245 in 2021.

== History ==
In 1800 the arrondissements of Clermont-Ferrand, Ambert, Issoire, Riom and Thiers were established. The arrondissement of Ambert was disbanded in 1926, and restored in 1942.

The borders of the arrondissements of Puy-de-Dôme were modified in January 2017:

- three communes from the arrondissement of Clermont-Ferrand to the arrondissement of Ambert
- 21 communes from the arrondissement of Clermont-Ferrand to the arrondissement of Issoire
- 17 communes from the arrondissement of Clermont-Ferrand to the arrondissement of Riom
- four communes from the arrondissement of Clermont-Ferrand to the arrondissement of Thiers
- one commune from the arrondissement of Riom to the arrondissement of Clermont-Ferrand
- three communes from the arrondissement of Thiers to the arrondissement of Riom
