= Canton of Cournon-d'Auvergne =

Coordinates: 45.74°N 3.20°E

The canton of Cournon-d'Auvergne is an administrative division of the Puy-de-Dôme department, central France. Its borders were modified at the French canton reorganisation which came into effect in March 2015. Its seat is in Cournon-d'Auvergne.

It consists of the following communes:

1. Le Cendre
2. Cournon-d'Auvergne
