= Chamalières =

- Commune
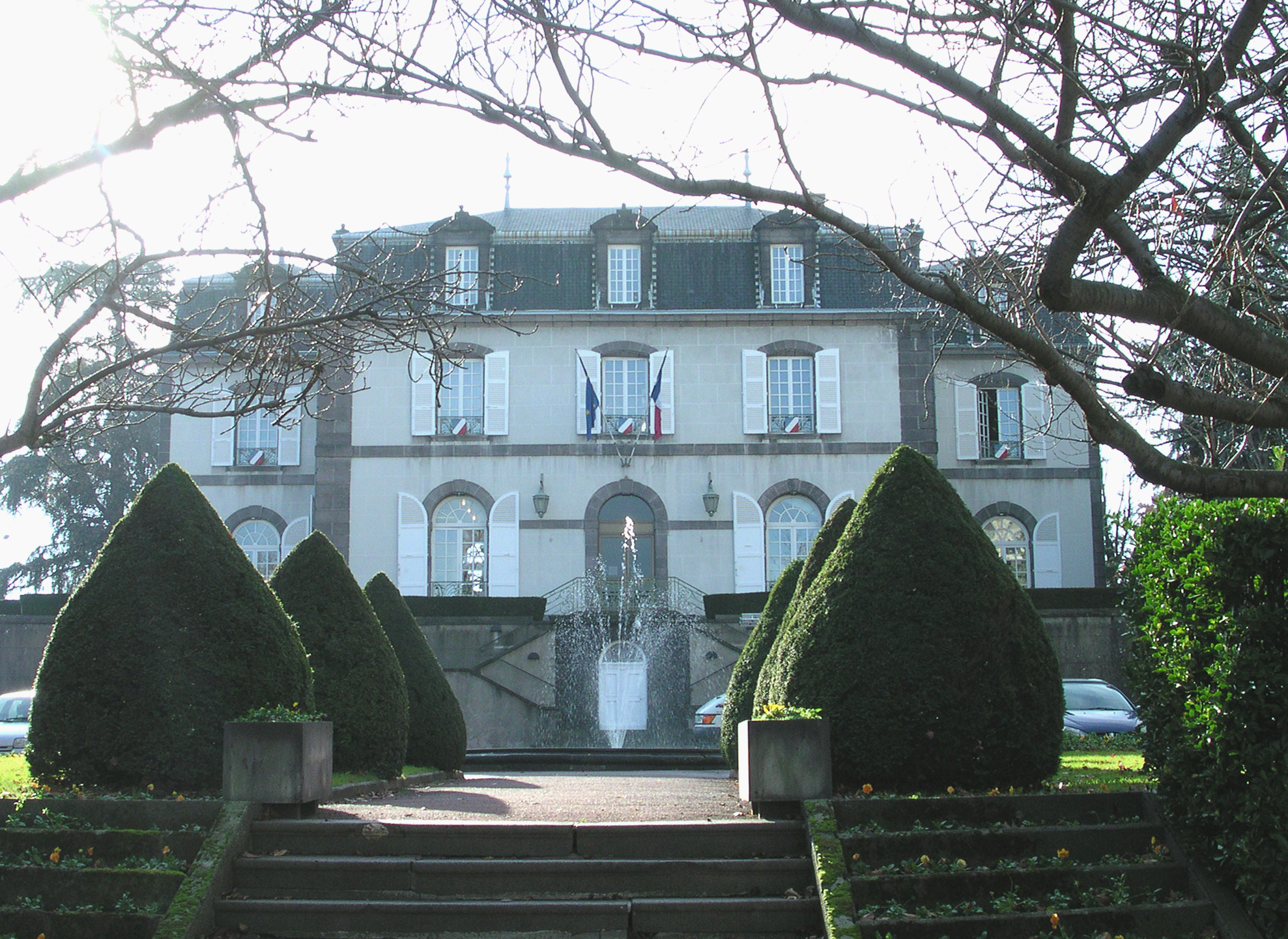
- Town hall

- Coat of arms
- Location of Chamalières
- Location within France Location within Auvergne-Rhône-Alpes
- Coordinates: 45°46′28″N 3°04′04″E
- Country: France
- Region: Auvergne-Rhône-Alpes
- Department: Puy-de-Dôme
- Arrondissement: Clermont-Ferrand
- Canton: Chamalières
- Intercommunality: Clermont Auvergne Métropole

Government
  - Mayor (2026–32): Louis Giscard d'Estaing
- Area^{1}: 3.77 km^{2} (1.46 sq mi)
- Elevation: 415 m (1,362 ft)
- Highest elevation: 582 m (1,909 ft)
- Lowest elevation: 385 m (1,263 ft)
- Population (2023): 17,509
  - Density: 4,640/km^{2} (12,000/sq mi)
- Time zone: UTC+01:00 (CET)
  - Summer (DST): UTC+02:00 (CEST)
- INSEE/Postal code: 63075 /63400
- ^{1} French Land Register data, which excludes lakes, ponds, glaciers > 1 km^{2} (0.386 sq mi or 247 acres) and river estuaries.

Chamalières (French pronunciation: [ʃamaljɛʁ]; Auvergnat: Chamaleiras) is a commune in the Puy-de-Dôme department, Auvergne-Rhône-Alpes, central France.

With 17,509 inhabitants (2023), Chamalières is the fourth-largest town in the department. It lies adjacent to the west of Clermont-Ferrand and about 241 kilometres (150 mi) from Lyon.

== History ==
Several thousand wooden Gallo-Roman ex-votos, most of them anthropomorphic standing figures, also including images of limbs and internal organs, dated by associated coins to the first century, were recovered from the shrine at the mineral springs known as the Source des Roches ("Rock Spring"). An inscribed lead tablet found at the spring is a major source of information on the Gaulish language. A comparable cache of Gaulish ex-voto were recovered from a sanctuary at the sources of the Seine, sacred to Sequana.

== Population ==
Historical population
Year	Pop.	±% p.a.
1968	17,775	—
1975	18,075	+0.24%
1982	17,486	−0.47%
1990	17,301	−0.13%
1999	18,136	+0.53%
2007	17,710	−0.30%
2012	17,480	−0.26%
2017	17,173	−0.35%
2023	17,509	+0.32%
Source: INSEE

== Notable places ==
Chamalières is the place where the Banque de France located its printing works in 1923, which printed former French franc banknotes, and now prints Euro and CFA franc banknotes.

== People ==
- Raoul Lufbery (1885–1918), French-American fighter pilot and flying ace in World War I
- Pierre Schoendoerffer (1928–2012), film director
- Valéry Giscard d'Estaing (1926-2020), politician, President of France (1974-1981), mayor of Chamalières (1967-1974)
- Claude Giraud (born 1936), stage and film actor; voice over actor for Robert Redford, Tommy Lee Jones, Alan Rickman
- Renaud Camus (born 1946), author and essayist
- Daniel Vernet (c. 1945–2018), former editor-in-chief of Le Monde.
- Pierre Woodman (born Pierre André Gerbier ín 29.April 1963) porn director
- Oumine Ouahioune (born Oumine Hassan Yusif Pontoise Ouahioune [born 1973] retired soccer player Centre-back
- Jean-Marie Luton (1942–2020), aerospace engineer, Director General of the European Space Agency (1990–1997), and chairman and CEO of Arianespace (1997–2002)

== See also ==
- Communes of the Puy-de-Dôme department
