= Pérignat-lès-Sarliève =

- Commune
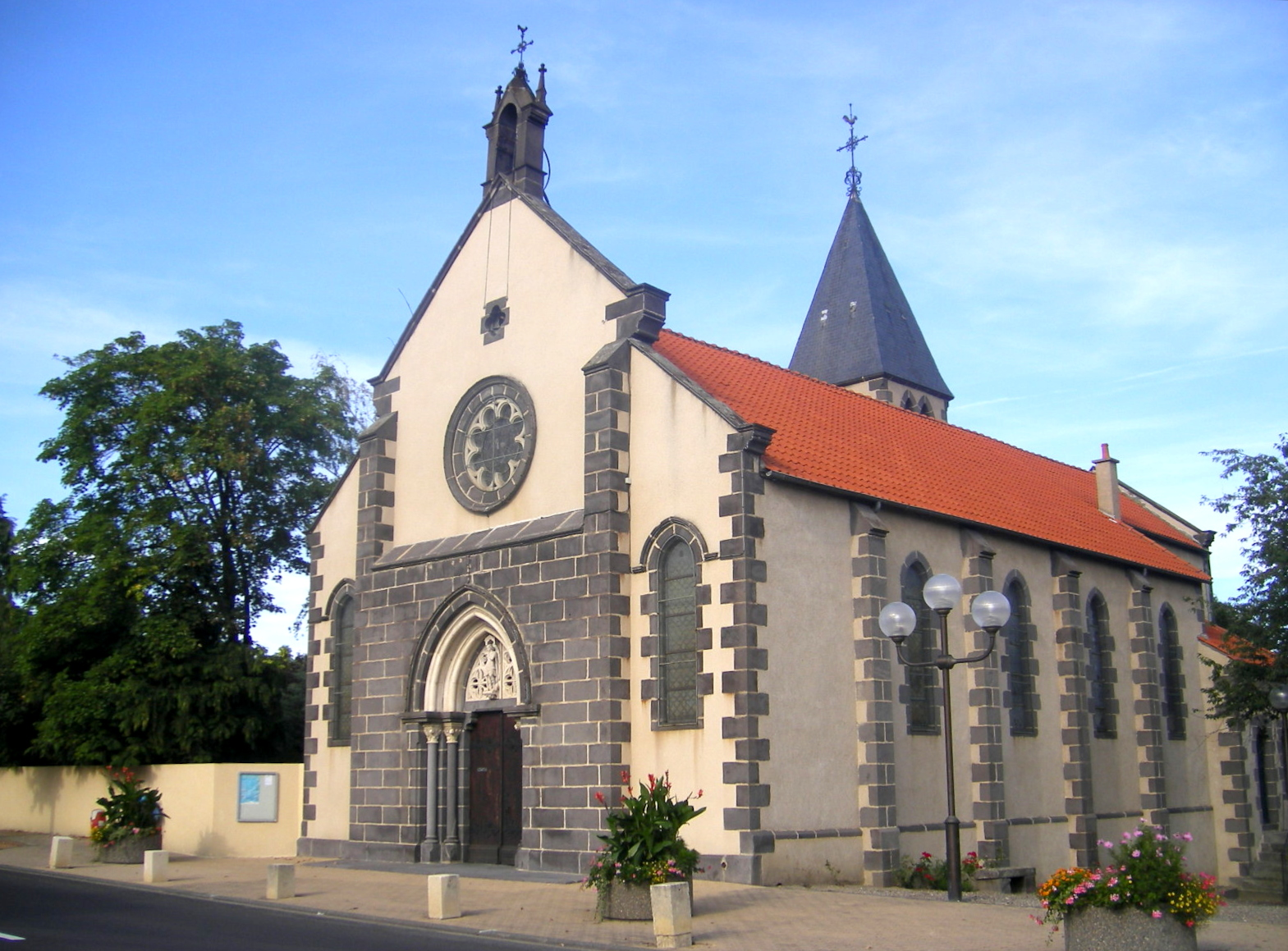
- The church in Pérignat-lès-Sarliève

- Coat of arms
- Location of Pérignat-lès-Sarliève
- Location within France Location within Auvergne-Rhône-Alpes
- Coordinates: 45°44′13″N 3°08′24″E
- Country: France
- Region: Auvergne-Rhône-Alpes
- Department: Puy-de-Dôme
- Arrondissement: Clermont-Ferrand
- Canton: Aubière
- Intercommunality: Clermont Auvergne Métropole

Government
  - Mayor (2026–32): Éric Grenet
- Area^{1}: 3.93 km^{2} (1.52 sq mi)
- Elevation: 360 m (1,180 ft)
- Highest elevation: 520 m (1,710 ft)
- Lowest elevation: 346 m (1,135 ft)
- Population (2023): 2,872
  - Density: 731/km^{2} (1,890/sq mi)
- Time zone: UTC+01:00 (CET)
  - Summer (DST): UTC+02:00 (CEST)
- INSEE/Postal code: 63272 /63170
- ^{1} French Land Register data, which excludes lakes, ponds, glaciers > 1 km^{2} (0.386 sq mi or 247 acres) and river estuaries.

Pérignat-lès-Sarliève (French pronunciation: [peʁiɲa lɛ saʁljɛv]; Auvergnat: Pairinhac de Sarlèiva) is a commune in the Puy-de-Dôme department in Auvergne in central France.

== Population ==
Historical population
Year	Pop.	±% p.a.
1968	789	—
1975	1,277	+7.12%
1982	1,445	+1.78%
1990	1,716	+2.17%
1999	2,221	+2.91%
2007	2,730	+2.61%
2012	2,650	−0.59%
2017	2,680	+0.23%
2023	2,872	+1.16%
Source: INSEE

== See also ==
- Communes of the Puy-de-Dôme department
