= Romagnat =

- Commune
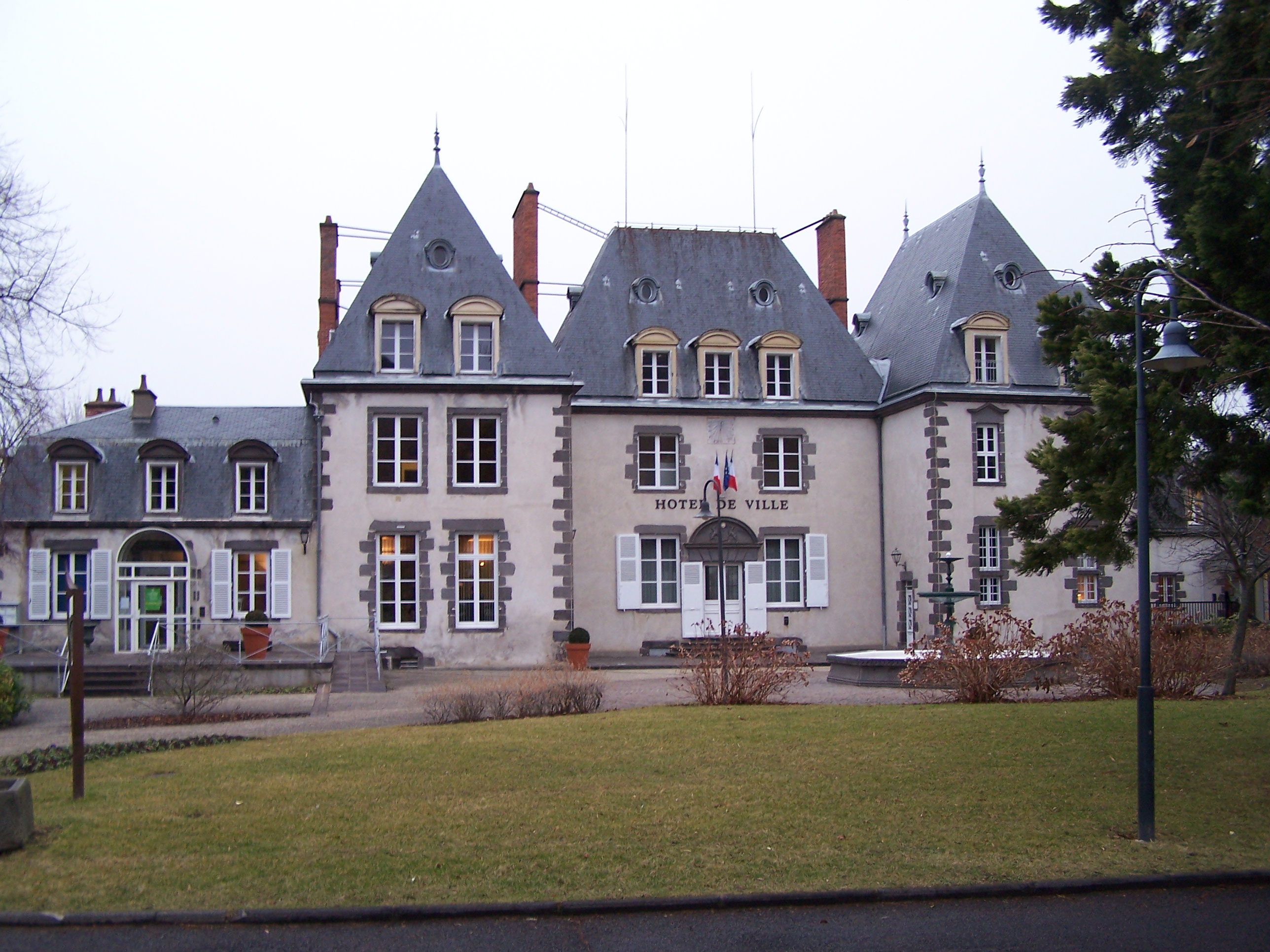
- The town hall in Romagnat

- Coat of arms
- Location of Romagnat
- Location within France Location within Auvergne-Rhône-Alpes
- Coordinates: 45°43′48″N 3°06′04″E
- Country: France
- Region: Auvergne-Rhône-Alpes
- Department: Puy-de-Dôme
- Arrondissement: Clermont-Ferrand
- Canton: Aubière
- Intercommunality: Clermont Auvergne Métropole

Government
  - Mayor (2026–32): Laurent Brunmurol
- Area^{1}: 16.84 km^{2} (6.50 sq mi)
- Elevation: 468 m (1,535 ft)
- Highest elevation: 837 m (2,746 ft)
- Lowest elevation: 391 m (1,283 ft)
- Population (2023): 7,894
  - Density: 468.8/km^{2} (1,214/sq mi)
- Time zone: UTC+01:00 (CET)
  - Summer (DST): UTC+02:00 (CEST)
- INSEE/Postal code: 63307 /63540
- ^{1} French Land Register data, which excludes lakes, ponds, glaciers > 1 km^{2} (0.386 sq mi or 247 acres) and river estuaries.

Romagnat (French pronunciation: [ʁɔmaɲa]; Auvergnat: Romanhat) is a commune in the Puy-de-Dôme department in Auvergne in central France.

== Population ==
Historical population
Year	Pop.	±% p.a.
1968	4,244	—
1975	5,983	+5.03%
1982	6,974	+2.21%
1990	8,268	+2.15%
1999	8,177	−0.12%
2007	8,234	+0.09%
2012	8,013	−0.54%
2017	7,705	−0.78%
2023	7,894	+0.40%
Source: INSEE

== Twin towns ==
- Licciana Nardi, Italy

== See also ==
- Communes of the Puy-de-Dôme department
