= Beaumont, Puy-de-Dôme =

Beaumont
- Commune
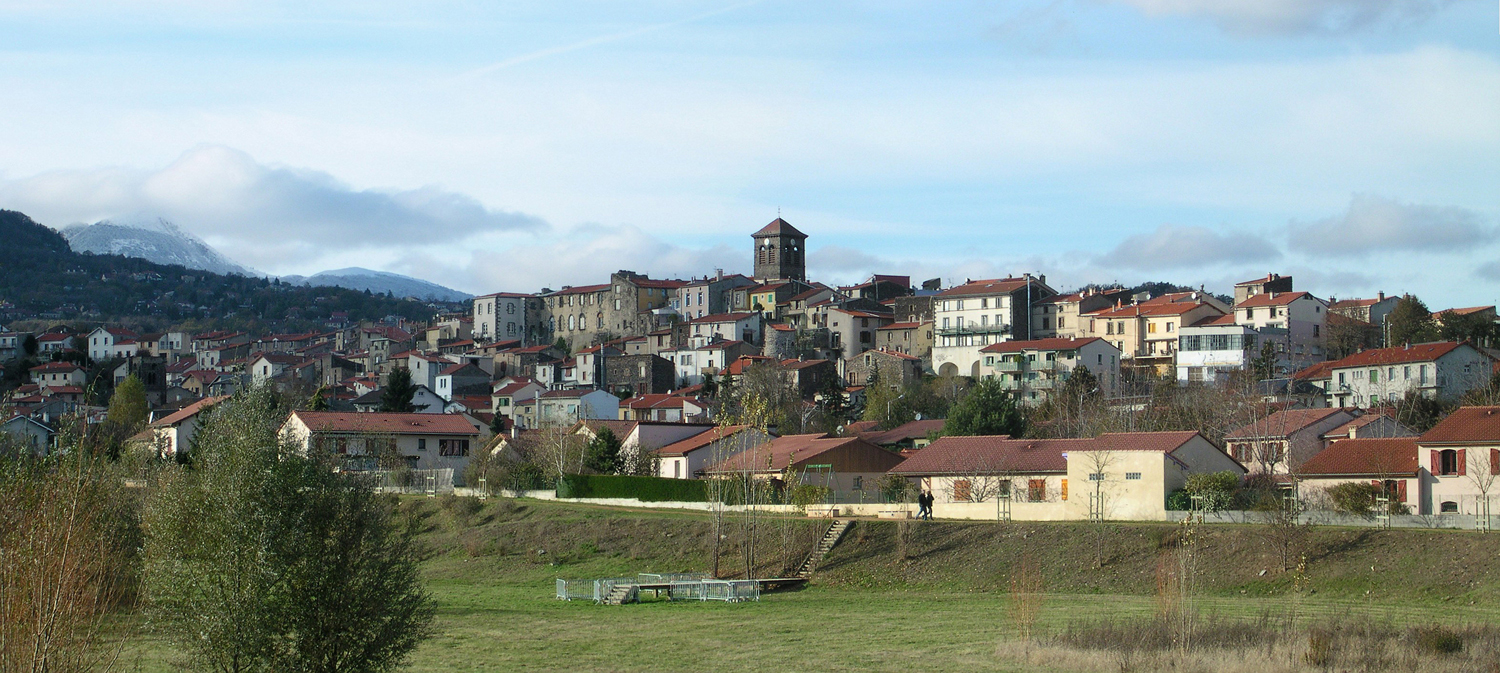
- Beaumont with the dormant volcano, the Puy de Dôme in the background

- Coat of arms
- Location of Beaumont
- Location within France Location within Auvergne-Rhône-Alpes
- Coordinates: 45°45′09″N 3°05′01″E
- Country: France
- Region: Auvergne-Rhône-Alpes
- Department: Puy-de-Dôme
- Arrondissement: Clermont-Ferrand
- Canton: Beaumont
- Intercommunality: Clermont Auvergne Métropole

Government
  - Mayor (2020–2026): Jean-Paul Cuzin
- Area^{1}: 4.01 km^{2} (1.55 sq mi)
- Elevation: 420 m (1,380 ft)
- Highest elevation: 518 m (1,699 ft)
- Lowest elevation: 393 m (1,289 ft)
- Population (2023): 10,728
  - Density: 2,680/km^{2} (6,930/sq mi)
- Time zone: UTC+01:00 (CET)
  - Summer (DST): UTC+02:00 (CEST)
- INSEE/Postal code: 63032 /63110
- Website: beaumont63.fr
- ^{1} French Land Register data, which excludes lakes, ponds, glaciers > 1 km^{2} (0.386 sq mi or 247 acres) and river estuaries.

Beaumont (Auvergnat: Biaumont) is a commune in the Puy-de-Dôme department in Auvergne-Rhône-Alpes in central France. The commune lies to the south of the dormant volcano, the Puy-de-Dôme (10 km from the commune and the city) which is clearly visible, including the telecommunication antennas that sit on its top.

== Population ==
Historical population

Year	Pop.	±% p.a.
1793	1,465	—
1800	1,642	+1.64%
1806	1,796	+1.51%
1821	1,856	+0.22%
1831	1,858	+0.01%
1836	1,953	+1.00%
1841	1,820	−1.40%
1846	1,919	+1.06%
1851	1,846	−0.77%
1856	1,741	−1.16%
1861	1,686	−0.64%
1866	1,563	−1.50%
1872	1,515	−0.52%
1876	1,439	−1.28%
1881	1,479	+0.55%
1886	1,474	−0.07%
1891	1,404	−0.97%
1896	1,388	−0.23%
1901	1,302	−1.27%

Year	Pop.	±% p.a.
1906	1,251	−0.80%
1911	1,328	+1.20%
1921	1,578	+1.74%
1926	2,345	+8.24%
1931	2,779	+3.45%
1936	2,780	+0.01%
1946	3,723	+2.96%
1954	4,405	+2.12%
1962	6,297	+4.57%
1968	6,930	+1.61%
1975	7,580	+1.29%
1982	8,023	+0.81%
1990	9,465	+2.09%
1999	10,741	+1.42%
2007	11,209	+0.53%
2012	10,933	−0.50%
2017	10,787	−0.27%
2023	10,728	−0.09%

Source: EHESS and INSEE (1968-2023)

== Personalities ==
Born in Beaumont:

- Audrey Tautou (9 August 1976), actress
- Annelise Hesme (born 11 May 1976), actress
- Aurélien Rougerie (born 24 September 1980), rugby union player, member of the French national team

== See also ==
- Communes of the Puy-de-Dôme department
