= Canton of Aubière =

Coordinates: 45.75°N 3.11°E

The canton of Aubière is an administrative division of the Puy-de-Dôme department, central France. Its borders were not modified at the French canton reorganisation which came into effect in March 2015. Its seat is in Aubière.

It consists of the following communes:

1. Aubière
2. Pérignat-lès-Sarliève
3. Romagnat
