= Canton of Chamalières =

Coordinates: 45.78°N 3.06°E

The canton of Chamalières is an administrative division of the Puy-de-Dôme department, central France. Its borders were modified at the French canton reorganisation which came into effect in March 2015. Its seat is in Chamalières.

It consists of the following communes:

1. Chamalières
2. Royat
