= Cantons of Clermont-Ferrand =

Coordinates: 45.78°N 3.08°E

The cantons of Clermont-Ferrand are administrative divisions of the Puy-de-Dôme department, in central France. Since the French canton reorganisation which came into effect in March 2015, the city of Clermont-Ferrand is subdivided into 6 cantons. Their seat is in Clermont-Ferrand.

== Cantons ==
Name	Population (2019)	Cantonal Code
Canton of Clermont-Ferrand-1	22,359	6310
Canton of Clermont-Ferrand-2	25,004	6311
Canton of Clermont-Ferrand-3	24,810	6312
Canton of Clermont-Ferrand-4	22,324	6313
Canton of Clermont-Ferrand-5	27,249	6314
Canton of Clermont-Ferrand-6	26,089	6315
