= Puy-de-Dôme =

Department in Auvergne-Rhône-Alpes, France

Puy-de-Dôme Puèi Domat (Occitan)
- Department of France
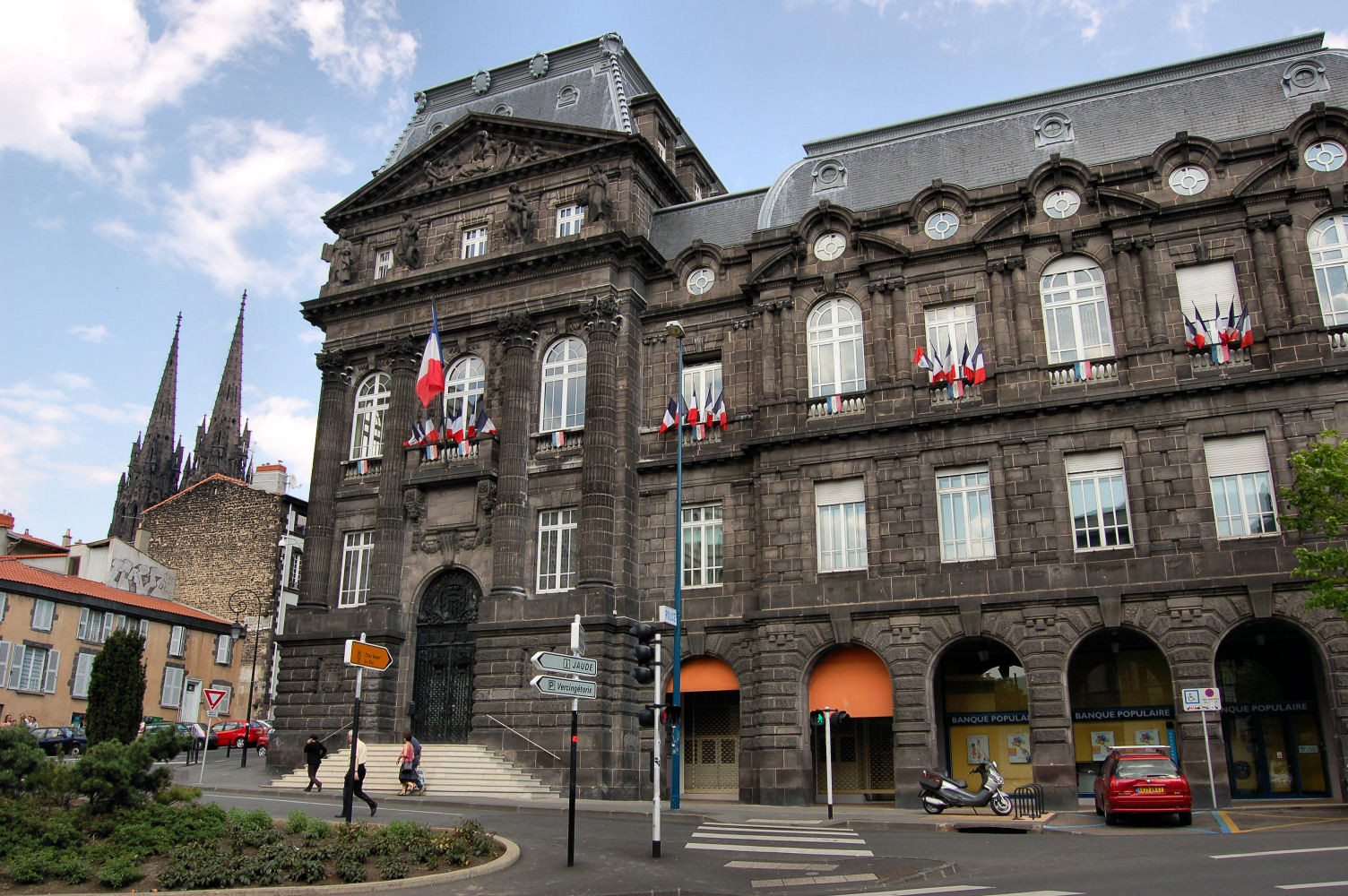
- Prefecture building in Clermont-Ferrand

- Flag Coat of arms

- Location of Puy-de-Dôme in France
- Coordinates: 45°42′N 3°13′E
- Country: France
- Region: Auvergne-Rhône-Alpes
- Prefecture: Clermont-Ferrand
- Subprefectures: Ambert; Issoire; Riom; Thiers

Government
  - President of the Departmental Council: Lionel Chauvin

Area^{1}
  - Total: 7,970 km^{2} (3,080 sq mi)

Population (2023)
  - Total: 664,453
  - Rank: 38th
  - Density: 83.4/km^{2} (216/sq mi)
- Time zone: UTC+1 (CET)
  - Summer (DST): UTC+2 (CEST)
- Department number: 63
- Arrondissements: 5
- Cantons: 31
- Communes: 463
- Website: puy-de-dome.fr
- ^1 French Land Register data, which exclude estuaries, and lakes, ponds, and glaciers larger than 1 km^{2}

Puy-de-Dôme (French: [pɥi də dom]; Auvergnat: lo Puèi de Doma or lo Puèi Domat) is a department in the Auvergne-Rhône-Alpes region in the centre of France. In 2023, it had a population of 664,453. Its prefecture is Clermont-Ferrand and subprefectures are Ambert, Issoire, Riom, and Thiers.

Named after the Puy de Dôme dormant volcano, its inhabitants were called Puydedomois in French until 2005. With effect from 2006, in response to a letter writing campaign, the name used for the inhabitants was changed by the Puy-de-Dôme General Council to Puydômois; this is the name that has since then been used in all official documents and publications.

== History ==
Puy-de-Dôme is one of the original 83 departments created during the French Revolution on 4 March 1790. It was created from part of the former province of Auvergne. Originally, the department was to be called Mont-d'Or ("Golden Mountain"), but this was changed to Puy-de-Dôme following the intervention of Jean-François Gaultier de Biauzat, a local deputy, because of a concern that the name originally chosen risked attracting excessive unwelcome attention from the national taxation authorities.

== Geography ==
Puy-de-Dôme is part of the current region of Auvergne-Rhône-Alpes and is bordered by the departments of Loire, Haute-Loire, Cantal, Corrèze, Allier, and Creuse. Parts of the department belong to the Parc naturel régional des Volcans d'Auvergne and Parc naturel régional Livradois-Forez.

The department is in the Massif Central and boasts more than 80 volcanic craters. It is three hours from Paris and an hour from Lyon by highways A71 and A89. The A75 links it to the Mediterranean Sea.

=== Principal towns ===
The most populous commune is Clermont-Ferrand, the prefecture. As of 2023, there are 10 communes with more than 10,000 inhabitants:

| Commune | Population (2023) |
|---|---|
| Clermont-Ferrand | 146,351 |
| Cournon-d'Auvergne | 19,951 |
| Riom | 18,820 |
| Chamalières | 17,509 |
| Issoire | 15,115 |
| Pont-du-Château | 12,412 |
| Thiers | 11,637 |
| Beaumont | 10,728 |
| Aubière | 10,459 |
| Gerzat | 10,335 |
Source: INSEE - Municipal population

== Demographics ==
Population development since 1801:

Historical population

| Year | Pop. | ±% p.a. |
|---|---|---|
| 1801 | 507,128 | — |
| 1806 | 542,834 | +1.37% |
| 1821 | 553,410 | +0.13% |
| 1831 | 573,106 | +0.35% |
| 1841 | 591,458 | +0.32% |
| 1851 | 596,897 | +0.09% |
| 1861 | 576,409 | −0.35% |
| 1872 | 566,463 | −0.16% |
| 1881 | 566,064 | −0.01% |
| 1891 | 564,266 | −0.03% |
| 1901 | 544,194 | −0.36% |
| 1911 | 525,916 | −0.34% |
| 1921 | 490,560 | −0.69% |
| 1931 | 500,590 | +0.20% |

| Year | Pop. | ±% p.a. |
|---|---|---|
| 1936 | 486,130 | −0.58% |
| 1946 | 478,903 | −0.15% |
| 1954 | 481,380 | +0.06% |
| 1962 | 508,928 | +0.70% |
| 1968 | 547,743 | +1.23% |
| 1975 | 580,033 | +0.82% |
| 1982 | 594,365 | +0.35% |
| 1990 | 598,213 | +0.08% |
| 1999 | 604,266 | +0.11% |
| 2007 | 626,639 | +0.46% |
| 2012 | 638,092 | +0.36% |
| 2017 | 653,742 | +0.49% |
| 2023 | 664,453 | +0.27% |

== Economy ==
The departmental seat, Clermont-Ferrand, is home to one of the country's best known manufacturing businesses and brands, Michelin. Thiers is the oldest industry place in Auvergne with its cutlery tradition from the 14th century.

The countryside lends itself to tourism and Puy-de-Dôme is a weekend destination for city dwellers. As of 2019, 10.1% of the usable homes in the department were being kept as second homes.

== Transport ==
The department is served by Clermont-Ferrand Auvergne Airport, which serves a small number of mostly domestic destinations. The nearest international airport is Lyon–Saint-Exupéry Airport. It is also served by numerous high-speed rail stations.

== Politics ==
The department was the electoral constituency of Valéry Giscard d'Estaing, who served as President of the Republic from 1974 to 1981. The president of the Departmental Council is Lionel Chauvin, elected in July 2021.

=== Current National Assembly Representatives ===
National Assembly Representatives to the 15th Legislature

| Constituency | Member | Party |
|---|---|---|
| Puy-de-Dôme's 1st constituency | Marianne Maximi | La France Insoumise |
| Puy-de-Dôme's 2nd constituency | Christine Pirès-Beaune | Socialist Party |
| Puy-de-Dôme's 3rd constituency | Nicolas Bonnet | The Ecologists |
| Puy-de-Dôme's 4th constituency | Delphine Lingemann | MoDem |
| Puy-de-Dôme's 5th constituency | André Chassaigne | French Communist Party |

== Tourism ==
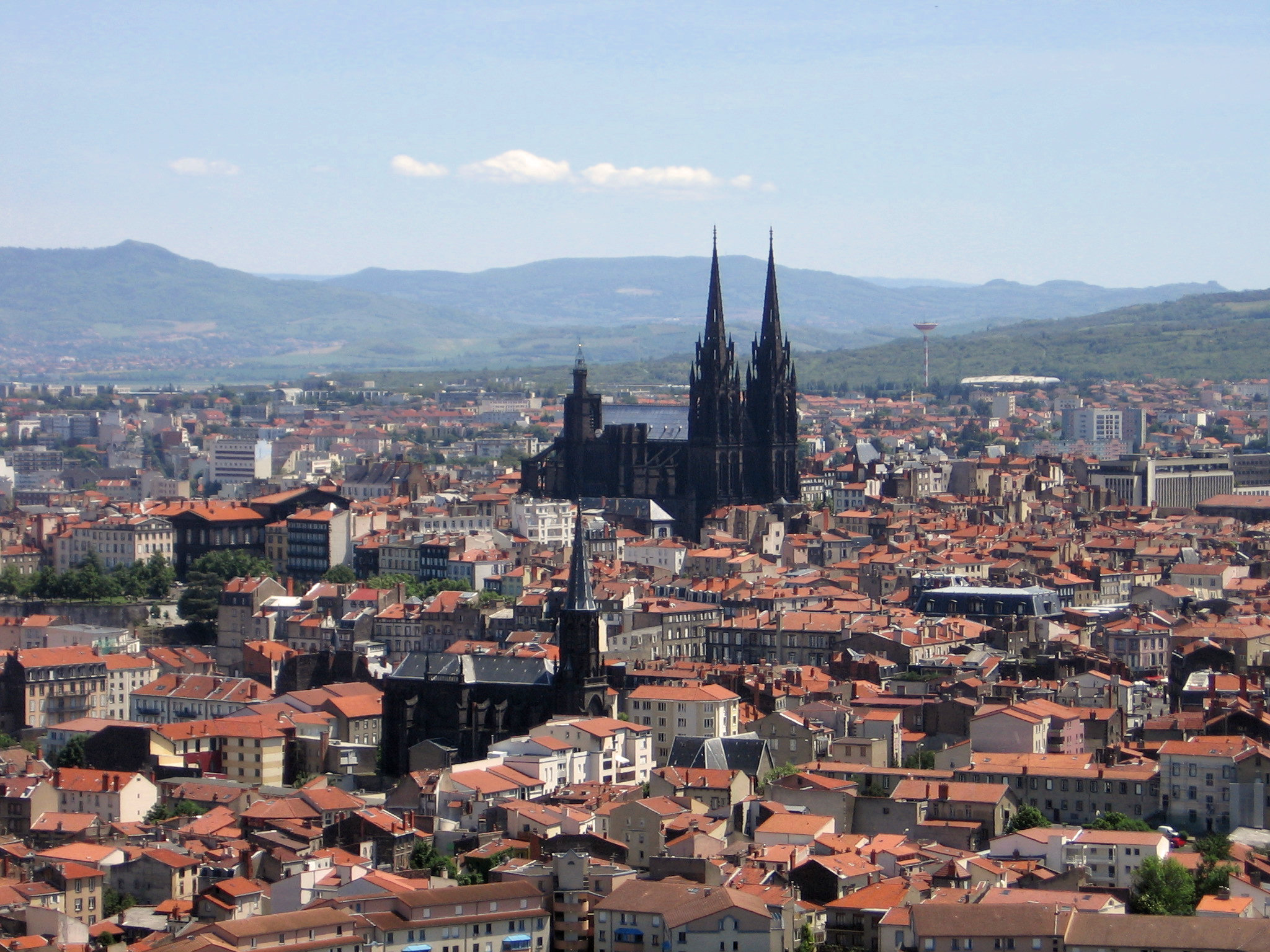
The black Cathedral of Clermont-Ferrand

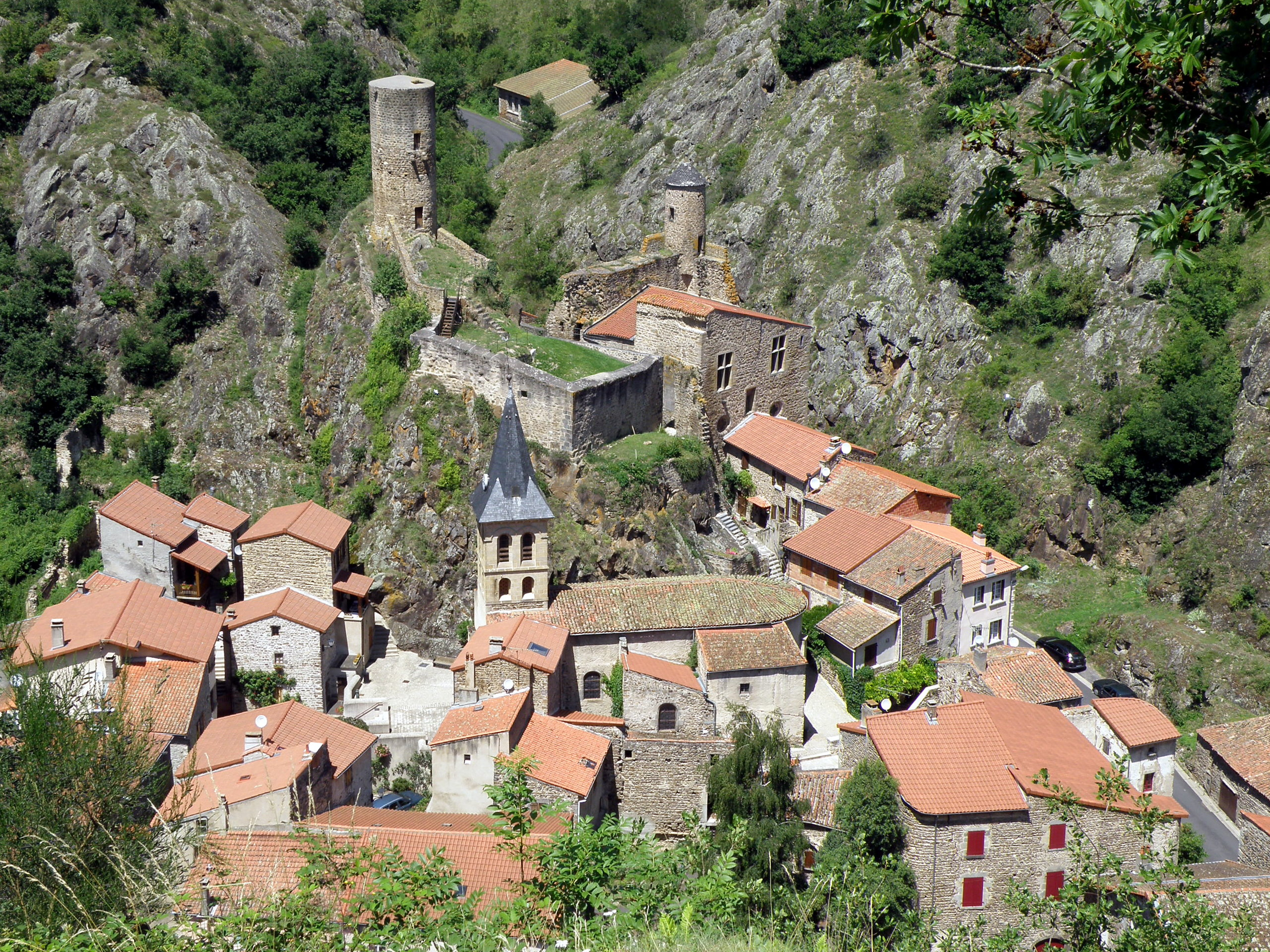
Saint-Floret, one of the most beautiful villages of France

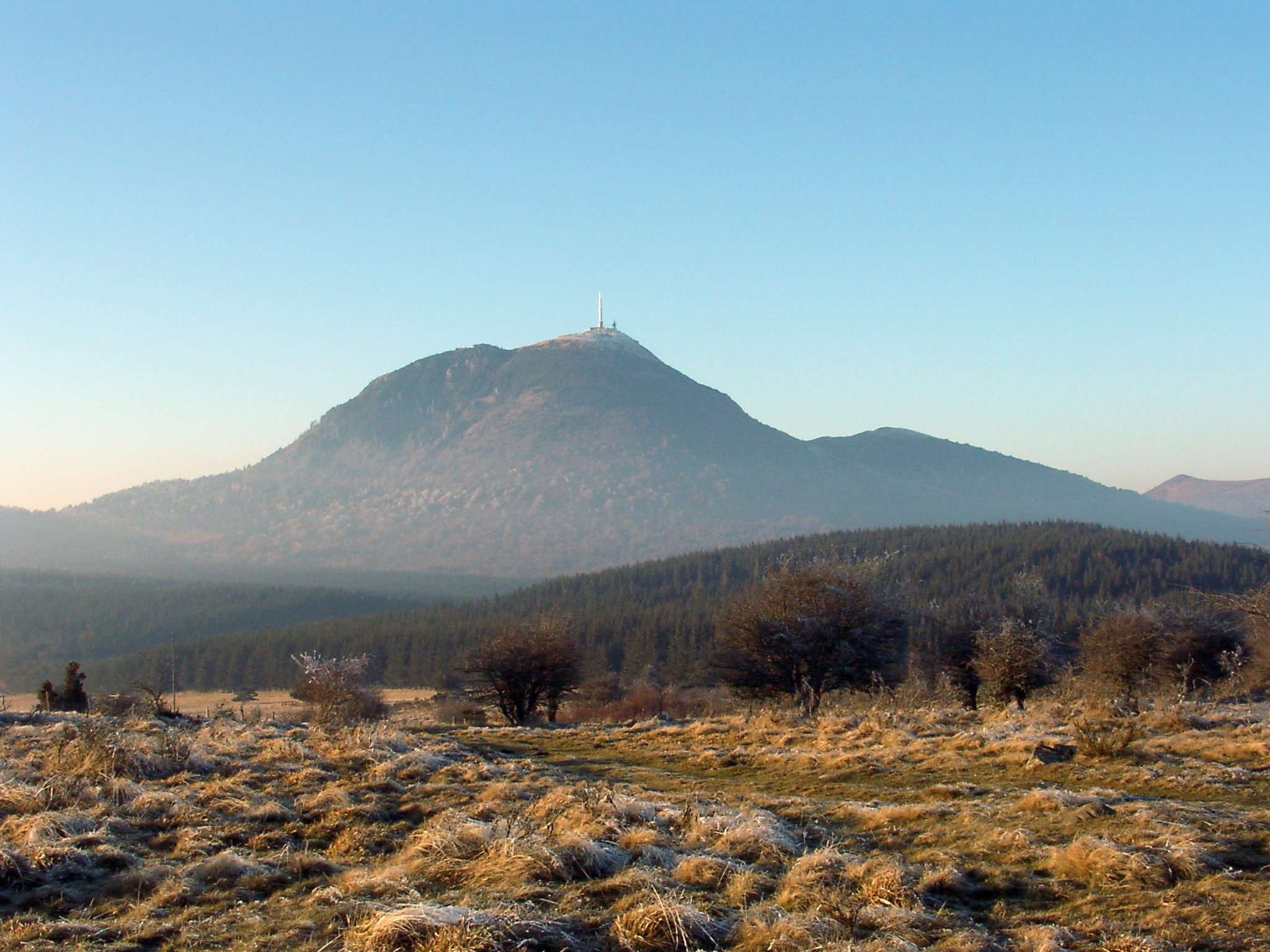
The Puy de Dôme volcano

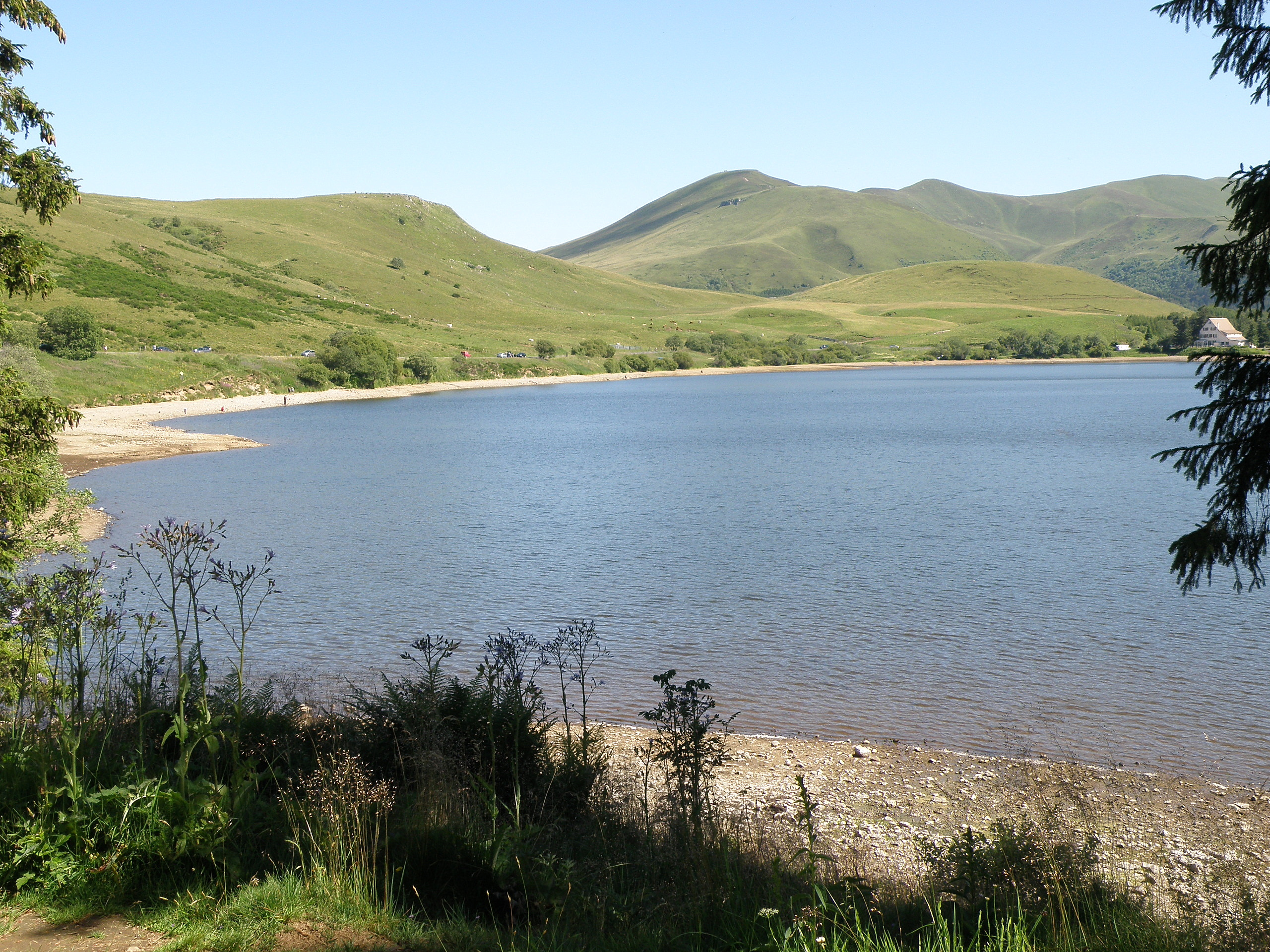
The Lac de Guéry in the Massif Central

== See also ==
- Cantons of the Puy-de-Dôme department
- Communes of the Puy-de-Dôme department
- Arrondissements of the Puy-de-Dôme department
- Maurice Persat
