= Roman theater of Montaudou =

Ancient Roman theater in Ceyrat, France

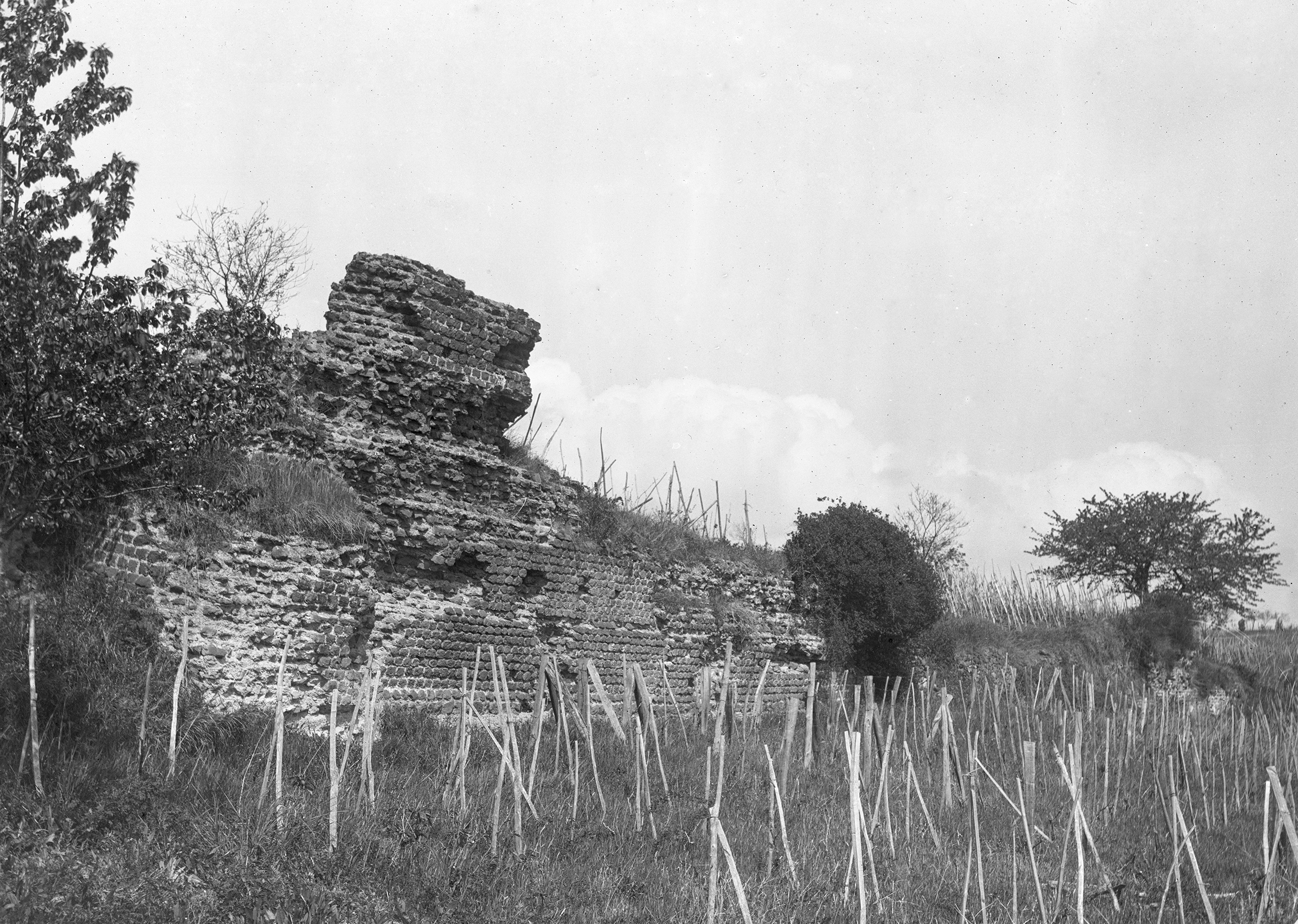
- View of the ruins of Montaudou (anonymous, circa 1892-1916).

- Roman theater of Montaudou (Auvergne-Rhône-Alpes) Roman theater of Montaudou (France)
- 45°45′38″N 3°4′19″E
- Location: France; Ancient city of Arverni; Modern department of Puy-de-Dôme; Modern commune of Ceyrat

The Roman theater of Montaudou is a performance building built in Gaul, in the city of Arveni, in the present-day commune of Ceyrat in the Puy-de-Dôme département. Its remains have been described since the early 19th century, thanks to the presence of a long wall some fifty meters long, known locally as the Saracen Wall. First interpreted as a sanctuary dedicated to Mercury, then as a Roman villa, the hypothesis of an ancient Roman theater emerged in the second half of the 20th century. However, it was not until a series of surveys in the 2000s that this interpretation was validated. Built at the end of the 1st century with a diameter of 51 m, the theater was extended to 81 m in the second half of the 2nd century. However, little is known about the building's evolution and abandonment. While it is now accepted that the theater is not isolated, particularly from probable dwellings and a potential temple with a centered plan, the exact nature of this pole located 1.5 km southwest of Augustonemetum/Clermont-Ferrand is not known, and the hypothesis of a secondary agglomeration independent of the Arverne capital has been put forward.

== Location and toponymy ==
The Montaudou theater is located 1.5 km southwest of Augustonemetum/Clermont-Ferrand, on the northwest flank of the puy of the same name. The remains of a long wall led to a triple medieval toponymy: Le Muret, La Cos dous Sarrazins and le Mur des Sarrasins (Saracen Wall). This last toponym is the one that still survives today and has described four ancient remains in and around Clermont-Ferrand, buildings considered pagan by late medieval Christians. The other best-known Saracen wall is the temple of Vasso Galate, near Place de Jaude.

== Historiography ==
Remains of the Puy de Montaudou have been described since at least the early 19th century. The presence of an imposing ancient wall, still standing several meters high, raised questions among local antiquarians and scholars. In 1805, Antoine Delarbre referred to "a temple dedicated to Mercury", while mid-century archaeological finds were summarily described by Henri Lecoq and Jean-Baptiste Bouillet. Pierre-Pardoux Mathieu, who described the site in 1855, refuted the sanctuary interpretation, considering that a temple would have been located at the summit rather than on a slope of the puy, and that it was inconsistent for two major temples dedicated to Mercury to have coexisted at Augustonemetum. He preferred the hypothesis of a large villa. Auguste Peghoux gave a detailed description around 1850 and also proposed an interpretation as a villa:}

This wall, a remnant of a larger construction, remains some forty feet long. It rests on thick masonry and features two square-shaped projections, which appear to be spurs built at the same time as the wall, undoubtedly intended to increase the strength of the wall in this very sloping limestone terrain. The facing is made of small, regular, cubic ashlars, perfectly staggered. The mark of the trowel used to press the mortar can still be seen between some of these stones. The stones inside the wall are still placed in a regular order, in superimposed courses... The western face of the wall, which is slightly uncovered and in contact with the ground, has no facing: the stones are simply partly covered by mortar pressed onto them. This seems to indicate that this side was not intended to be uncovered... Farmers have told me that they have found water and pipes in the ground above the wall, which is more level than the slope of the land would suggest. The peasants claim that there are remains of buildings buried in the land around this wall and above it to the right and left: the fact is that on the surface we can see debris of pottery and tiles.

The 20th century did not see a proliferation of descriptions, with the exception of Henri and Emmanuel du Ranquet who, in a guide to the commune of Royat, evoked the many hypotheses linked to this wall and its remains; they did not take sides, however, but referred to the discovery of mosaics, marbles and ceramics. It was in the middle of this century that Pierre-François Fournier and surveyor J. Vyé visited the site, drew up a plan of the remains, described the masonry precisely and found numerous ceramics. The historian finally rejected the earlier interpretations, proposing that of a "theater front wall", at the suggestion of Jean-Jacques Hatt.

In 1983, Anne-Marie Romeuf conducted soundings that revealed the existence of a wall perpendicular to the great wall. At the end of the same decade or at the beginning of the next, Marie-Christine Pin and Vincent Guichard carried out a topographical survey and once again evoked the stage wall of an ancient theater. Another exploration was opened in 1991 under the direction of Sophie Liégard and Anne-Marie Jouquand.

In 2005, as part of the "Atlas topographique d'Augustonemetum" collective research program, Christian Le Barrier carried out a topographical survey of the Saracen wall, as well as two test pits which validated the interpretation of the site as a theater. This was followed by a second survey in 2006, then inconclusive geophysical investigations in 2007 and a final exploratory campaign in 2008. Although preventive archaeology operations have since been carried out in the surrounding area, no further work has been carried out on the theater.

== Vestiges ==
=== First level ===
General plan of the theater's first level. Documented walls Restored walls

The Saracen wall is 48 m long, with a further 2 m extending southwards, beyond two 2.50x1 m buttresses that mark the limits of the main wall. The main wall is 1.50 m wide at its foundation, decreasing in thickness to 1.20 m as it rises, with a retained elevation of 4.50 m. A breach of 22 m corresponds to the area where the ground pushed in and caused the wall to give way, destroying 11 m of its length. Several repairs indicate that the masonry has been reworked, and putlog holes are still visible.

The theater's first level is characterized by a diameter of 51 m. Along the cavea, which was only recognized in its northern, heavily eroded section, 0.80 m square buttresses were observed at 3.60 m intervals. A peripheral circulation space of this first level was recognized to the north, with a width of 14 m or more. Shoe nails were observed in this area. The environment of this first level is poorly documented, with the exception of walls identified in its immediate periphery, but whose function has not been identified.

The first level is dated to the last quarter of the 1st century.

=== Second level ===
General plan of the theater's second level. Documented walls Restored walls

The second level of the theater saw an increase in its diameter, from 51 m to 81 m. However, the layout of the cavea has not been fully recognized, its extension to the west is uncertain, and the dimensions proposed by the excavators are based on the assumption of symmetrical states of the theater. Nevertheless, it is certain that the first level has been flattened. A succession of low walls discovered in the center of the building may correspond to tiers that are not stratigraphically linked to either state. However, the diameter of the second level is more in line with these low walls.

The second level is dated to the second half of the first century. Its abandonment has not been documented.

=== Surroundings ===
In the southwest corner of the theater, an anomaly was identified during the 2017 geophysical exploration. The first level revealed paving, a gutter and two perpendicular walls, dating back to the last third of the 1st century. The building was then extensively remodeled during the second half of the first century, and presented the layout of a temple with a centered plan. (Note: While the terminology fanum is still commonly used by archaeologists, recent historiographical research shows that it is a contemporary construction linked to French archaeological research: Carpentier, Lucie (April 2, 2015). "Un axe de recherche pour l'origine des temples à plan centré en Gaule romaine: une nouvelle analyse fonctionnelle des espaces". Annales de Janua (in French) (3). ISSN 2267-1358.) While Christian Le Barrier remained cautious about this interpretation, not knowing whether this was a temple with a centered plan, a sanctuary in its own right or another building, Hélène Dartevlle was more affirmative: "A fanum has been recognized to the south-west of the theater. Its cella represented a square almost 8 m square, with a peripheral gallery around 3.20 m wide". The relationship between the theater and this building is not known: its orientation differs and it seems to constrain the extension of the cavea wall to the west. This layout is known from several ancient sites in the Massif Central.

Other building remains, occasionally observed in the vicinity during archaeological diagnostic operations, were interpreted as the remains of dwellings. Two masonry cisterns and walls, dated between the second half of the 1st century and the first half of the 1st century, have been observed to the south of the theater. The performance building was therefore not an isolated structure, but part of a larger complex, the understanding of which remains very partial.

== Interpretation ==
The Montaudou theater is interpreted as the ancient theater of the Arvernian capital, Augustonemetum. A second building of this type, located in the urban center, is assumed, but no trace of it has been found. Its history remains unknown and Christian Le Barrier proposes, as an unsubstantiated hypothesis, that the building was the work of a wealthy local evergete, perhaps the owner of the rich villa found nearby in rue Docteur-Lepetit. The theater's relative proximity to the ancient thermal baths of Royat, 1.3 km away, is also suggested but not substantiated. In addition, there are no known access routes between the capital and the theater.

Christian Le Barrier and Hélène Dartevelle, following Florian Baret's suggestion that Ceyrat was an established agglomeration, suggest the existence of a "small agglomeration". Florian Baret points out, however, that it is still difficult to grasp the organization of the ancient capital's peripheral space, and that the theater could be part of an independent agglomeration.

The theater's location on a hill visible from the main sites in the Clermont area seems to have been motivated by criteria of visibility and orientation with regard to wind and light, with a potentially symbolic aim.

During the Middle Ages, the site was subject to a number of reclamations.

== Bibliography ==
- Baret, Florian (2022). Origines de la ville dans le Massif Central. Les agglomérations antiques. Villes et Territoires (in French). Tours: Presses universitaires François-Rabelais. ISBN 978-2-86906-804-9.
- Dartevelle, Hélène (2021). Augustonemetum. Atlas topographique de Clermont-Ferrand. Histoire et archéologie (in French). Gollion: Infolio. ISBN 978-2-88474-415-7.
- Le Barrier, Christian (2006). "Sondage. Ceyrat. Les Buges de Montaudou – mur des Sarrasins (parcelles A 225, 243 et 244, 247, 253, 255)". Bilan scientifique 2005 de la région Auvergne (in French). Clermont-Ferrand: SRA Auvergne. pp. 116–119.
- Le Barrier, Christian (2007). "Sondage. Ceyrat. Les Buges de Montaudou (mur des Sarrasins)". Bilan scientifique 2006 de la région Auvergne (in French). Clermont-Ferrand: SRA Auvergne. pp. 130–134.
- Le Barrier, Christian (2008). "Prospection thématique. Beaumont, Ceyrat, Chamalières, Clermont-Ferrand et Royat. l'environnement archéologique du théâtre antique de Montaudou". Bilan scientifique 2007 de la région Auvergne (in French). Clermont-Ferrand: SRA Auvergne. p. 138.
- Le Barrier, Christian (2009). "Sondage. Ceyrat. Les abords du théâtre de Montaudou". Bilan scientifique 2007 de la région Auvergne (in French). Clermont-Ferrand: SRA Auvergne. p. 139.
- Le Barrier, Christian (2021). "Feuille 40. Montaudou". Augustonemetum. Atlas topographique de Clermont-Ferrand. pp. 173–186.
- Provost, Michel; Mennessier-Jouannet, Christine (1994). Clermont-Ferrand. Carte archéologique de la Gaule (in French). Paris: Académie des inscriptions et belles-lettres. ISBN 2-87754-030-8.
