= Timeline of Clermont-Ferrand =

The following is a timeline of the history of the city of Clermont-Ferrand, France.

== Early history ==
- 1st C. BCE – Augustonemetum founded at near Nemossos, the ancient capital of the Arverni
- 2nd C. CE – Augustonemetum has grown into a city, with a population estimated at between 15,000 and 30,000
- 3rd C. CE
  - the city is depopulated, and survives only as a fort at the site of the forum.
  - St Austremonius, the apostle of Auvergne and first bishop of Clermont.
- 4th C. CE – the settlement is now known as Arvernis, with a population estimated at 700 people; the Roman Catholic diocese of Clermont is established. Five gates are built into the fortifications, while the rest of the Roman city lies in ruins.
- 5th C. – Abbey of Saint Allyre construction begins.
- 471/475 – Arvernis besieged by the Visigoths; part of the Visigothic kingdom until the Frankish conquest in 507.
- 535 – Council of Clermont (535).
- 549 – Second council of Clermont.
- 587 – Third council of Clermont.

== Medieval to early modern ==
- 761 – Pepin the Short pillages urbs Arverna and takes its fort, Claremontem Castrum in the Siege of Clermont (761).
- 848 – first mention of the name Clermont (Clarus Mons) as the name of the city; Arvernis remains in use as alongside Clermont at least until the end of the 9th century.
- 862 – city destroyed by Vikings and rebuilt under bishop Sigon
- 898/910 – city again pillaged by Vikings
- 946 – traditional date for the consecration of the Romanesque cathedral built under bishop Stephen II.
- 1095 – Council of Clermont: pope gives speech that starts the First Crusade.
- 12th C. – Basilica of Notre-Dame du Port rebuilt (approximate date).
- 1130 – Religious council held in Clermont.
- 13th C. – Construction of gothic-style Clermont Cathedral begins.
- 1273 – Chapelle des Cordeliers (Clermont-Ferrand) construction begins.
- 15th C. – Château de Rabanesse construction begins.
- 1515 – Fontaine d'Amboise (fountain) erected by Jacques d'Amboise.
- 1623 – 19 June: Birth of Blaise Pascal.
- 1665 – Grands jours d'Auvergne begin.
- 1675 – Collège des Jésuites de Clermont-Ferrand building construction begins.
- 1731 – Towns of Clermont and Montferrand merge to become "Clermont Montferrand."
- 1747 – Clermont-Ferrand Academy of Sciences, Humanities and Arts founded.
- 1790 – Clermont-Ferrand becomes part of the Puy-de-Dôme souveraineté.

== 19th century ==
- 1801
  - Cantons of Clermont-Est, Clermont-Nord, Clermont-Sud, and Clermont-Sud-Ouest created
  - Fontaine de la Pyramide erected
- 1806 – Population: 30,982
- 1826 – Chamber of Commerce established
- 1844 – Hôtel de Ville completed.
- 1855
  - Clermont-Ferrand station opens
  - Moniteur du Puy-de-Dôme newspaper begins publication
- 1858 – Fontaine des Quatre-Saisons (Clermont-Ferrand) installed in the Place de la Rodade
- 1862 – Clermont-Ferrand Synagogue and Church of Saint Eutropius built
- 1886 – Population: 46,718
- 1889 – Michelin et Cie in business
- 1890 – Clermont-Ferrand tramway initiated
- 1894 – Société d'histoire naturelle d'Auvergne established
- 1895 – Fontaine d'Urbain II installed in the Place de la Victoire (Clermont-Ferrand)
- 1896 – Avenir du Puy-de-Dôme newspaper begins publication

== 20th century ==
- 1906 – Galeries de Jaude (shop) built.
- 1911 – Population: 65,386.
- 1919 – La Montagne newspaper begins publication.
- 1921 – Population: 82,577.
- 1926 – Population: 111,711.
- 1940
  - June: City briefly occupied by German forces.
  - July: City becomes temporary seat of government of France, which shortly relocates to Vichy.
- 1944 – Le Semeur Hebdo begins publication.
- 1961
  - Gare routière (Clermont-Ferrand) built.
  - Association Montferrand Renaissance founded.
- 1974 – Jardin botanique de la Charme (garden) created.
- 1975 – Population: 156,763.
- 1977 – Islamic community of Clermont-Ferrand established in the former Refuge du Bon Pasteur chapel.
- 1979 – Maison des Congrès et de la Culture (Clermont-Ferrand) in use.
- 1982
  - Cantons Centre, Nord-Ouest, Ouest, Sud-Est, and Montferrand created.
  - Clermont-Ferrand International Short Film Festival begins.
- 1995 – Radio Campus Clermont-Ferrand begins broadcasting.
- 1999
  - Polydome convention centre opens.
  - Population: 137,140.

== 21st century ==
- 2003 – Le Magazine Zap begins publication.^{(fr)}
- 2006
  - Place de Jaude inaurated.
  - Clermont-Ferrand tramway begins operating.
- 2010 – Grande mosquée de Clermont-Auvergne built.
- 2012 – Population: 141,569.
- 2014 – Olivier Bianchi becomes mayor.
- 2015
  - Cantons of Clermont-Ferrand-1, 2, 3, 4, 5 and 6 created per Cantons of France redistricting, 2014.
  - March: Puy-de-Dôme departmental election, 2015 held.
  - December: Auvergne-Rhône-Alpes regional election, 2015 held.
- 2016 – Clermont-Ferrand becomes part of the Auvergne-Rhône-Alpes region.

== See also ==
- Clermont-Ferrand history
- History of Clermont-Ferrand
- Augustonemetum (Roman-era settlement)
- List of mayors of Clermont-Ferrand
- List of heritage sites in Clermont-Ferrand

other cities in the Auvergne-Rhône-Alpes region

- Timeline of Grenoble
- Timeline of Lyon
- Timeline of St Etienne
- Timeline of Vienne

== Bibliography ==
=== in English ===
- Abraham Rees (1819), "Clermont", The Cyclopaedia, London: Longman, Hurst, Rees, Orme & Brown, hdl:2027/mdp.39015057241146
- "Clermont". Chambers's Encyclopaedia. London. 1901. hdl:2027/njp.32101065312884.
- S. Kahn (1903), "Clermont-Ferrand", Jewish Encyclopedia, vol. 4, New York, hdl:2027/mdp.49015002282284
- "Clermont-Ferrand" . Encyclopædia Britannica. Vol. 6 (11th ed.). 1910. p. 498.
- Georges Goyau (1910). "Clermont". Catholic Encyclopedia. New York.
- "Clermont-Ferrand", Southern France (6th ed.), Leipzig: Baedeker, 1914, hdl:2027/uc1.31822019077254
- Daniel C. Haskell, ed. (1922), "Provencal literature and language, including the local history of southern France", Bulletin of the New York Public Library, vol. 26, hdl:2027/mdp.39015035117657, "Local history: Clermont-Ferrand"
- John F. Sweets (1986). Choices in Vichy France: The French Under Nazi Occupation. Oxford University Press. ISBN 978-0-19-503751-7. (case study of Clermont-Ferrand)

=== in French ===
- Jean-Baptiste-Joseph Champagnac [in French] (1839). "Clermont-Ferrand". Manuel des dates, en forme de dictionnaire. Perisse frères.
- Benoît Gonod [in French] (1839). "Histoire moderne (Villes et provinces de France): Clermont". Catalogue des livres imprimés et manuscrits de la bibliothèque de la ville de Clermont-Ferrand. Clermont-Ferrand: Perol.
- Jean-Baptiste Bouillet [in French]. Tablettes historiques de l'Auvergne (in French). Clermont-Ferrand. 1840–1847. 8 vols.
- Ambroise Tardieu (historian) [in French] (1872). Histoire de la ville de Clermont-Ferrand (in French).
- Clermont-Ferrand et le Puy-de-Dôme (in French). Association française pour l'avancement des sciences. 1908.
- "Clermont-Ferrand". Auvergne et centre. Guides Joanne (in French). Hachette. 1908. hdl:2027/uc1.a0001078203.
- Chardonnet, Sylvain (2025). "Le quartier arménien de Clermont-Ferrand (années 1930). Un rassemblement d'Arméniens du Nord-Ouest de l'Anatolie en Auvergne". Bulletin Historique et Scientifique de l'Auvergne (in French). CXXII-2 (2023). Clermont-Ferrand, France: Académie des Sciences, Belles-Lettres et Arts de Clermont-Ferrand: 43–68.
