= Clermont-Ferrand tramway (1890–1956) =

The Clermont-Ferrand tramway was a tram system in the French city of Clermont-Ferrand between 1890 and 1956. A new system came into operation in 2006.

== Company ==
Permission to build a tram line between Montferrand and Royat, with a branch line heading to Clermont-Ferrand station, was granted to engineer Jean Claret (fr) on 27 January 1888, who created the limited partnership Jean Claret & Co. On 13 December 1893 this was replaced by the Clermont-Ferrand Electric Tramway Company (Compagnie des tramways électriques de Clermont-Ferrand), created on 2 May that same year. On 23 December 1911 this company merged with the Clermont-Ferrand-Puy-de-Dôme Railway Company (Compagnie du chemin de fer de Clermont-Ferrand au sommet du Puy-de-Dôme), responsible for running trains to the summit of the nearby Puy de Dôme volcano, to form the Clermont-Ferrand and Puy-de-Dôme Tramway Company (Compagnie des tramways de Clermont-Ferrand et du Puy-de-Dôme).

== History of the tram system ==
The first tram line entered service on 7 January 1890. The system was unique in France at the time for using electric power supplied by overhead lines. The system was identical to that used by the Vevey–Montreux–Chillon–Villeneuve tramway in Switzerland. This first line, running on metre-gauge lines, connected the old district of Montferrand with the Place de Jaude in central Clermont. The rolling stock at the time consisted of twenty-two cars, each with two motorised axles for climbing hills. In 1902, a section connecting Jaude to Place Delille (fr) via Place Gaillard (fr) opened, followed in 1913 by a link to the station via the Rue des Salins and a short section heading north from Place Gaillard to the Fontgiève (fr) district. In 1914, a line was opened between the suburb of Beaumont and the city centre, following what is now bus route 4.

Just after the First World War, the rolling stock was modernised. Throughout the first half of the twentieth century, new stock was regularly acquired to tackle increasing demand and serve new lines. In 1932, the system had at its disposal 33 engines and 24 trailers. Following the war, the Beaumont line was extended to Ceyrat. Clermont residents quickly took to travelling out to the countryside on Sundays, and numerous restaurants, bars and cafés sprung up on the main road in Ceyrat. In 1928, a line to Aubière was created, following current bus route 3.

In the wake of the Second World War, the Clermont tram system only suffered minor cuts. Despite its rolling stock dating from the 1930s, the system remained popular and well-appreciated. However, new attitudes towards urban planning obliged authorities to lend priority to the private automobile, and a program of "traffic improvement" was initiated. Wide boulevards were created by removing trees, one-way streets were put in place, traffic lights were erected, and the tramways, which occupied the middle of the thoroughfares and obstructed the flow of cars, were removed. From 1950, the lines were progressively replaced by bus routes.

The network disappeared between 1933 and 1956. The final Clermont tram ran on the 17 March 1956, before being replaced by a bus route. In many places, the rails were simply paved over rather than being removed.

== Lines ==
Route	Length (km)	Opened	Closed
Montferrand–Place de Jaude–Royat	6.6	1890	1956
Place de Jaude–Gare	0.9	1890	1956
Place Delille–Boulevard de la Pyramide–Place de Jaude	1.6	1895	1917
Place Lamartine–Les Quatre Routes	2.5	1912	1933
Place Gaillard–Fontgiève	0.8	1913	1929
Place de Jaude–Place des Salins–Gare	2.0	1913	1956
Place des Salins–Beaumont	2.2	1914	1956
Montferrand–Arsenal des Gravranches	1.3	1917	1921
Beaumont–Ceyrat		1922	1956
Place de Jaude–Aubière		1928	1949

== Power supply ==
Current was provided at 500V by a generator in the depot at Montferrand. Originally, power was supplied by copper-covered overhead lines. Trams would attach via trolley pole to a sliding module on the underside of these copper lines. This system was similar to the one used by the Vevey–Montreux–Chillon–Villeneuve tramway since 1888. However, Claret introduced a new innovation to the Clermont system; the current was returned via the rails, rather than by a second overhead line.

== Gallery ==
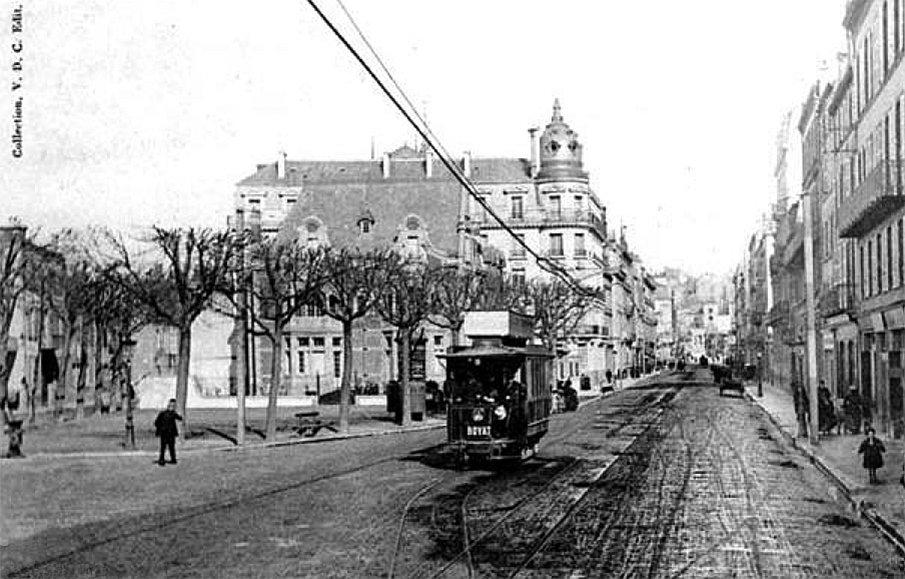
Electric tram (early 20th century)

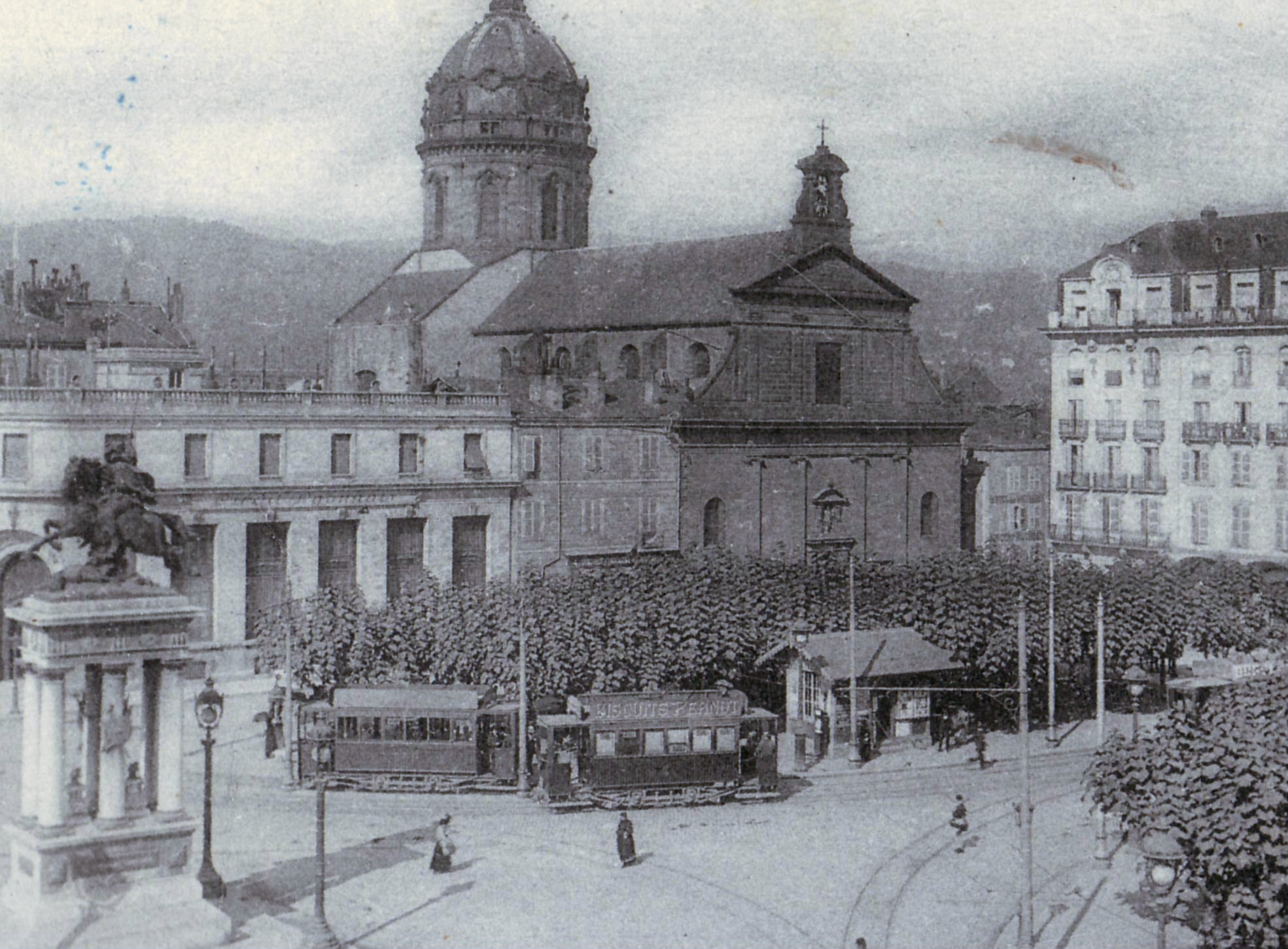
Place de Jaude station, before the First World War

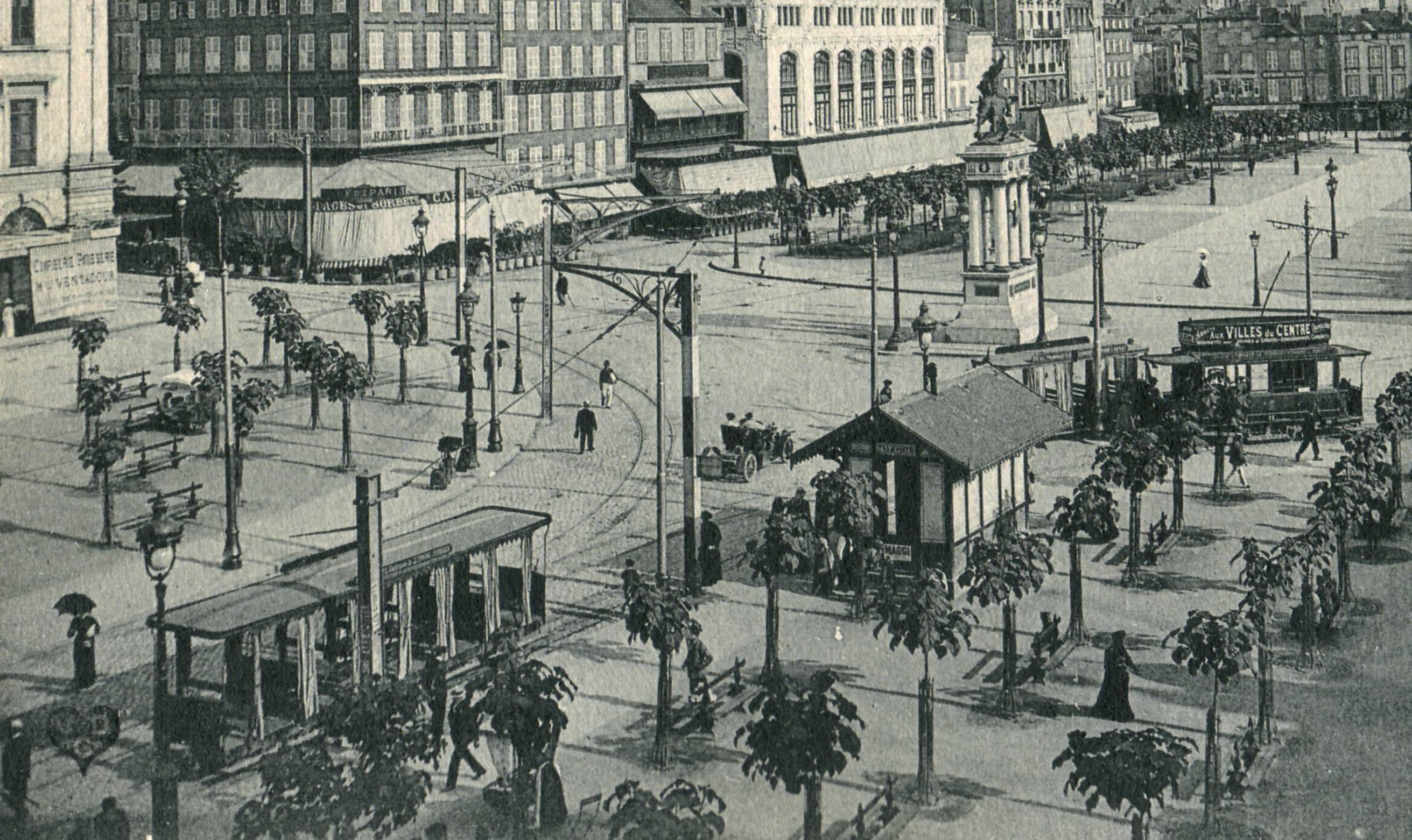
Photo taken of the Place de Jaude just after the statue of Vercingetorix was erected

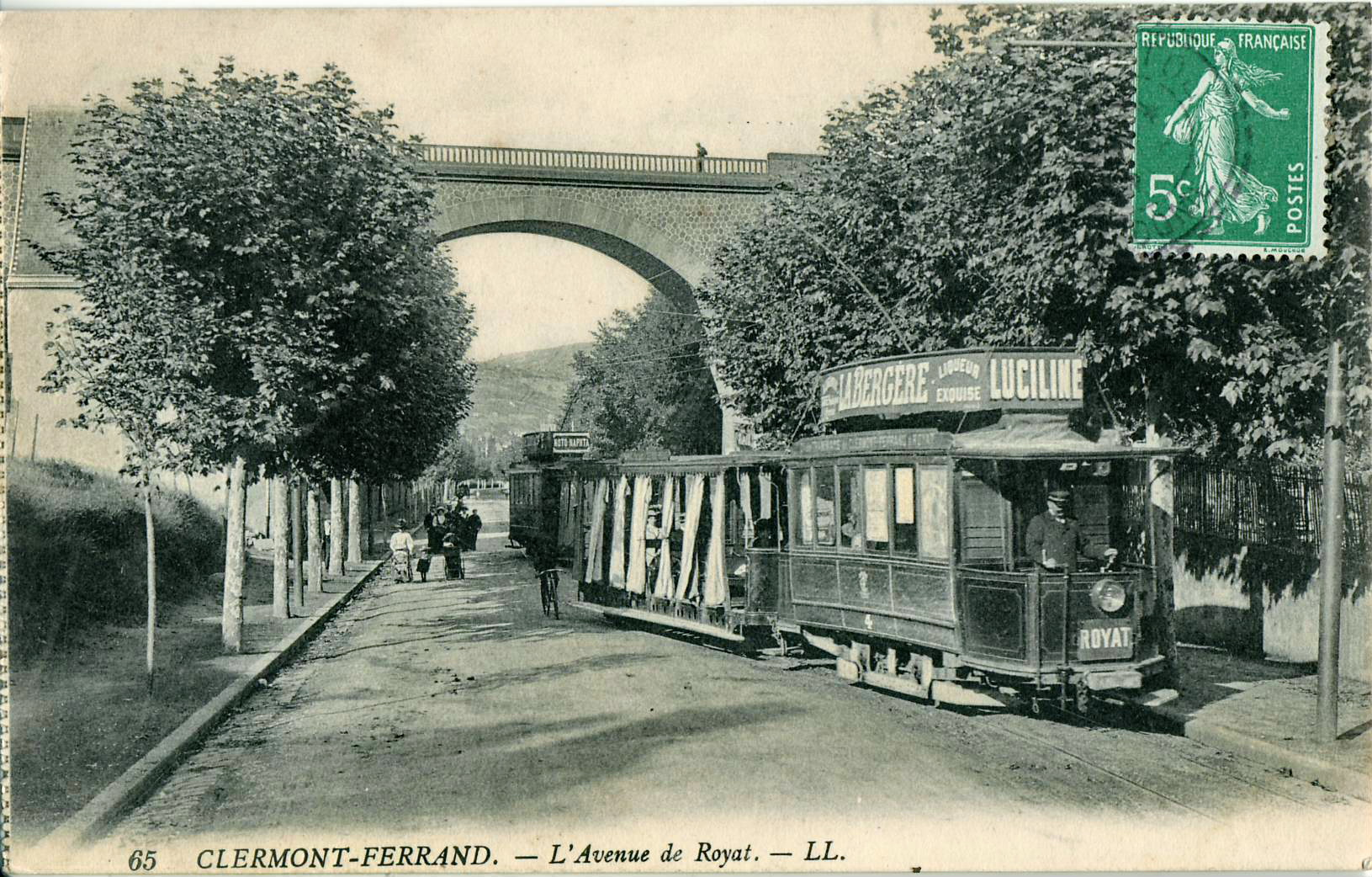
A tram with its trailer open at Royat, before the First World War

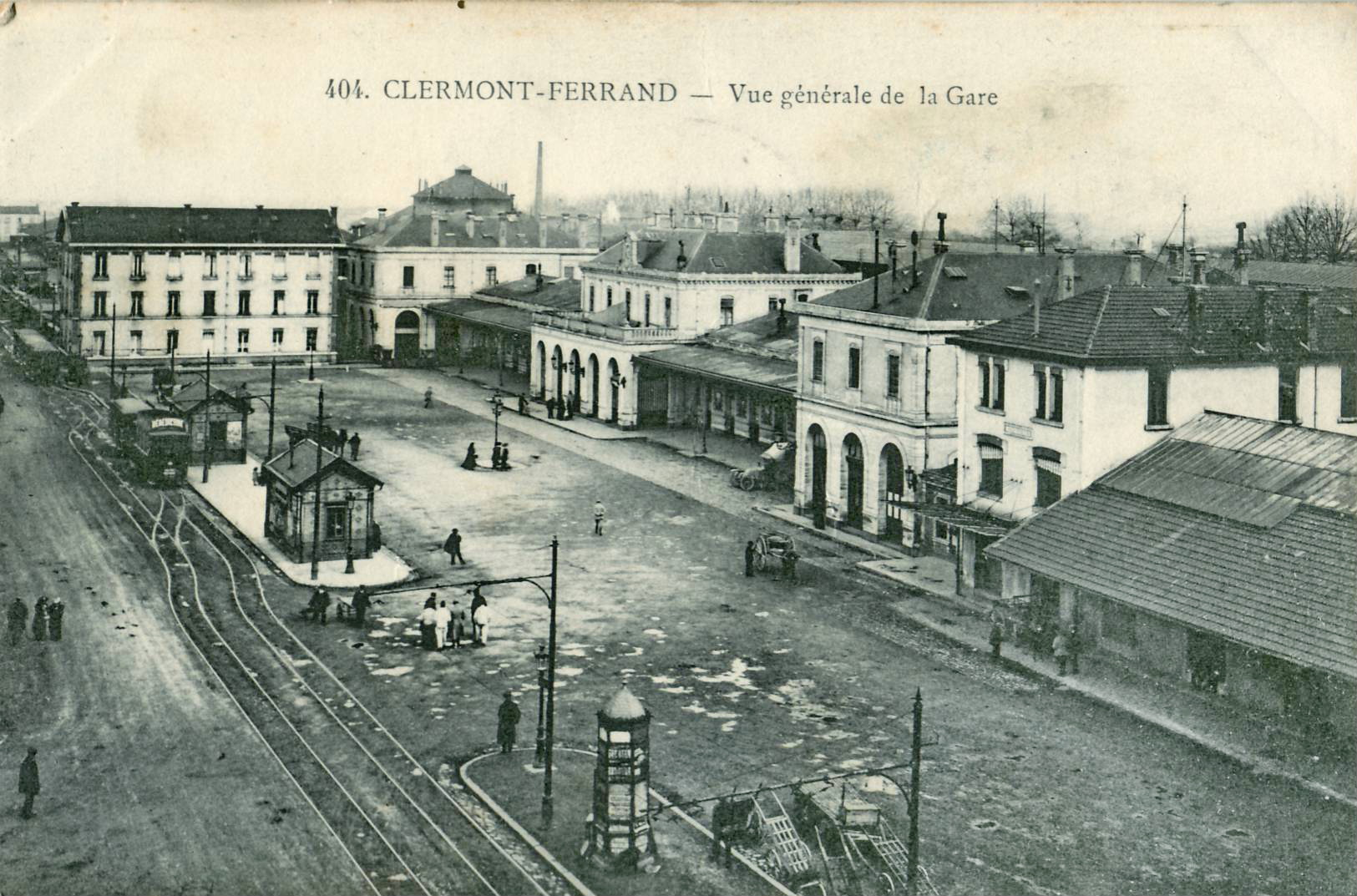
Tram rails in front of the station, on a postcard from 1916

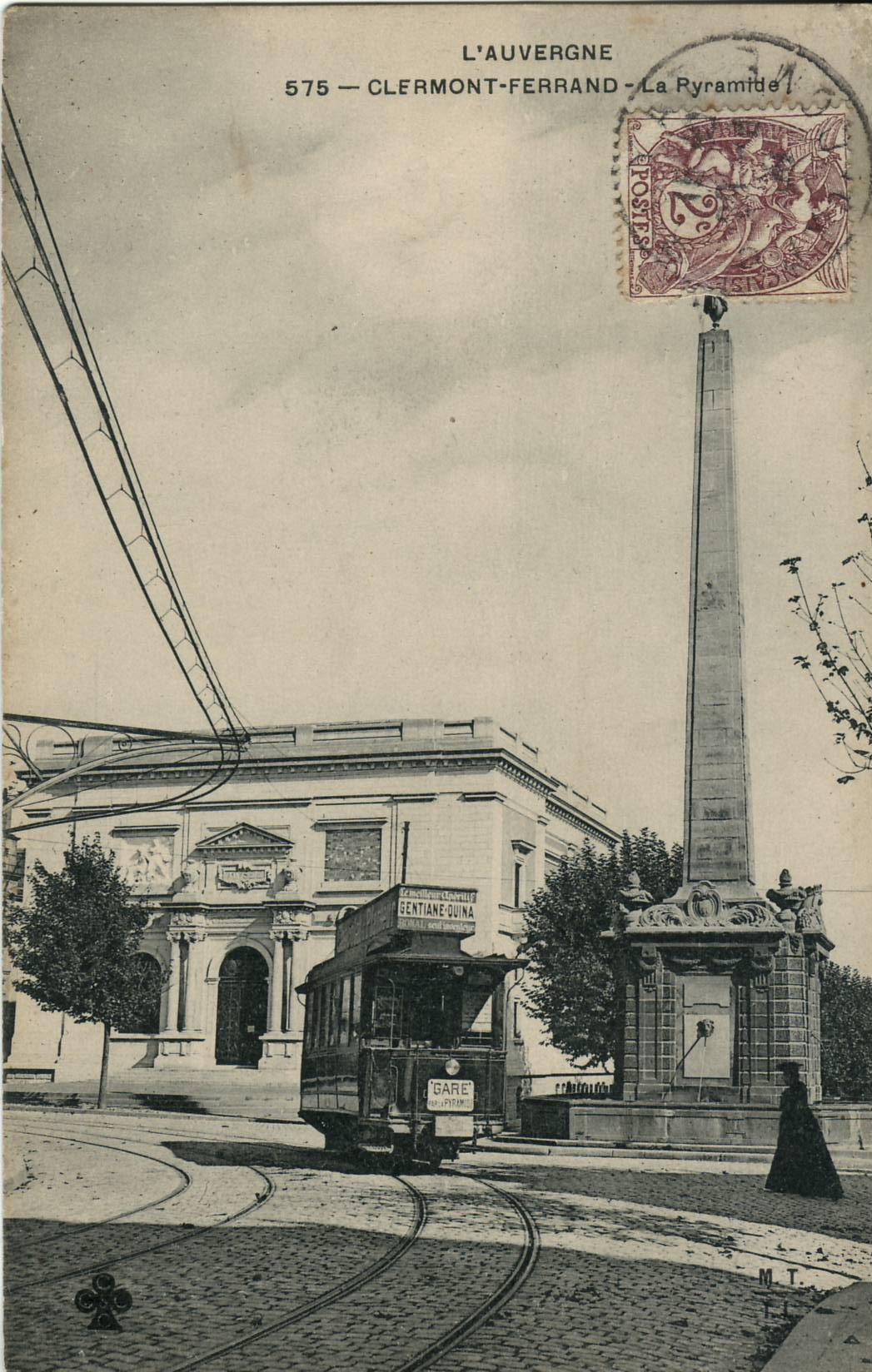
The power supply system rested on a sliding module inside a copper tube, which served as an overhead line
