= Timeline of Grenoble =

The following is a timeline of the history of the city of Grenoble, France.

== Prior to 11th century ==
- 43 BCE – First mention of Cularo
- 4th century – Roman Catholic diocese of Cularo established.
- 292 – Gallo-Roman wall of Cularo completed
- 381 – Cularo becomes Gratianopolis
- 879 – Grenoble becomes part of the Kingdom of Provence.
- 902 – First reference of Grenoble Cathedral

== 11th–17th centuries ==
- 1012 – First mention of Saint-Laurent Church
- 1110 – The son of Count Guigues III of Albon is nicknamed Dauphin (Guigo Delphinus), later Dauphin of France
- 1219 – September: Grenoble flood 1219.
- 1337 – Conseil Delphinal (court) founded.
- 1339 – Gratianopolis becomes Gregnoble
- 1381 – Construction start of the Tour de l'Isle
- 1390 – Public clock installed (approximate date).
- 1453 - Parlement du Dauphiné created.
- 1539 - Palais du parlement du Dauphiné expanded.
- 1562 - Sacked by the Protestants under Baron des Adrets
- 1590 - Duke of Lesdiguières took the town in the name of Henry IV.
- 1592 - First Bastille built by Lesdiguières.
- 1625 – Hôtel de la Première présidence built.
- 1627 – General Hospital construction begins.
- 1639 – Construction start of a new wall by François de Bonne de Crequi
- 1647 – Construction start of Sainte-Marie-d'en-Bas
- 1675 – End of the construction of the wall by Crequi
- 1699 – Saint-Louis Church erected

== 18th century ==
- 1772 – Académie Delphinale and Bibliothèque municipale de Grenoble founded.
- 1778 – October: Flood ("déluge de Saint-Crépin").
- 1788 – 7 June: Social unrest ("Day of the Tiles").
- 1790 – Grenoble becomes part of the Isère souveraineté.
- 1793 – Population: 20,019.
- 1798 – Museum of Grenoble established.

== 19th century ==
- 1810 – Saint Roch Cemetery opened
- 1815 - Opened its gates to Napoleon on his return from Elba on 7 March.
- 1836 – Extension of wall by general Haxo
- 1847 – Bastille rebuilt by general Haxo.
- 1858 – Chemins de fer du Dauphiné railway begins operating.
- 1859 – 2 November: Grenoble flood.
- 1864
  - Grenoble–Montmélian railway begins operating.
  - Chamber of Commerce established.
- 1886 – Population: 52,484.
- 1892 – FC Grenoble (football club) formed.
- 1894 – Tram begins operating.^{(fr)}
- 1899
  - Grenoble Power and Light Company established.
  - Grenoble-Chapareillan tramway begins operating.

== 20th century ==
- 1906
  - Opening of the Musée dauphinois
  - Population: 58,641.
- 1911 – Population: 77,438.
- 1925
  - International Exhibition of Hydropower and Tourism held in Grenoble.
  - Perret tower (Grenoble) erected.
- 1934 – Grenoble-Bastille cable car begins operating.
- 1945 – Le Dauphiné libéré newspaper begins publication.
- 1946 - Population: 102,161.
- 1956 - First works in Polygone Scientifique
- 1965 - Hubert Dubedout becomes mayor.
- 1966 – opening of Musée de la Résistance et de la Déportation
- 1967
  - Palais des Sports (Grenoble) opens.
  - Foundation of the Institut Laue–Langevin
  - Foundation of LETI
  - Hôtel de Ville completed.
- 1968
  - Gare de Grenoble rebuilt.
  - 1968 Winter Olympics held in Grenoble.
- 1970 – Joseph Fourier University, Pierre Mendès-France University, and Stendhal University established.
- 1973 - Socialist Party national congress held in Grenoble.
- 1976 - Population : 166,037
- 1982 – Grenoble becomes part of the Rhône-Alpes region.
- 1983 – Alain Carignon becomes mayor.
- 1987 – Grenoble tramway begins operating.
- 1994
  - new building for the Museum of Grenoble
  - European Synchrotron Radiation Facility begins operating.
- 1995 – Michel Destot becomes mayor.
- 1997 – Grenoble Foot 38 (football club) formed.
- 1998
  - Musée de l'Ancien Évêché inaugurated
  - March: 1998 Rhône-Alpes regional election held.
- 2000 – Socialist Party national congress held in Grenoble again.

== 21st century ==
- 2001 – Opening of Patinoire Polesud
- 2004 – March: 2004 Rhône-Alpes regional election held.
- 2005 – Launch of téléGrenoble Isère (local television).
- 2006 – Opening of Minatec.
- 2008 – Stade des Alpes (stadium) opens.
- 2011 – Population: 157,424.;> opening of Clinatec
- 2014
  - March: Grenoble municipal election, 2014 held.
  - Éric Piolle becomes mayor.
- 2015
  - Grenoble-Alpes Métropole established.
  - 110,000 people demonstrate against attacks in Paris
  - December: Auvergne-Rhône-Alpes regional election, 2015 held.
- 2016 – Grenoble becomes part of the Auvergne-Rhône-Alpes region.

== See also ==
- Grenoble history
- History of Grenoble
- List of mayors of Grenoble
- List of heritage sites in Grenoble
- History of Isère department
- History of Rhône-Alpes region

other cities in the Auvergne-Rhône-Alpes region

- Timeline of Clermont-Ferrand
- Timeline of Lyon
- Timeline of St Etienne
- Timeline of Vienne

== Bibliography ==
=== in English ===
- *"Grenoble", Handbook for Travellers in France, London: John Murray, 1861
- "Grenoble". Chambers's Encyclopaedia. London. 1901. hdl:2027/njp.32101065312900.
- Coolidge, William Augustus Brevoort (1910). "Grenoble" . Encyclopædia Britannica. Vol. 12 (11th ed.). p. 579.
- "Grenoble", Southern France (6th ed.), Leipzig: Baedeker, 1914
- Daniel C. Haskell, ed. (1922), "Provencal literature and language, including the local history of southern France", Bulletin of the New York Public Library, vol. 26, hdl:2027/mdp.39015035117657, "Local history: Grenoble"
- Kathryn Norberg (1985). Rich and Poor in Grenoble, 1600–1814. University of California Press. ISBN 978-0-520-05260-4.

=== in French ===
- Eusèbe Girault de Saint-Fargeau [in French] (1850). "Grenoble". Guide pittoresque: portatif et complet, du voyageur en France (in French) (3rd ed.). Paris: Firmin Didot frères. hdl:2027/uiug.30112081968700.
- Jean-Joseph-Antoine Pilot de Thorey (1851). Histoire municipale de Grenoble.
- Antonin Macé (1861). Guide-itinéraire des chemins de fer du Dauphiné: Grenoble (in French).
- Auguste Prudhomme (1888). Histoire de Grenoble (in French). A. Gratier.
- Albert Albertin; André Albertin [in French] (1900). Histoire contemporaine de Grenoble et de la région dauphinoise (in French). Grenoble: Alexandre Gratier et Cie – via HathiTrust. v.1 (1848–55) + v.2 (1855–62)
- Guide pratique de Grenoble, Uriage, Allevard. Guides Pol (in French) (5th ed.). Lyon. circa 1900s
- "Grenoble". Dictionnaire Bouillet (in French) (34th ed.). Hachette. 1914. hdl:2027/mdp.39015074817142.
