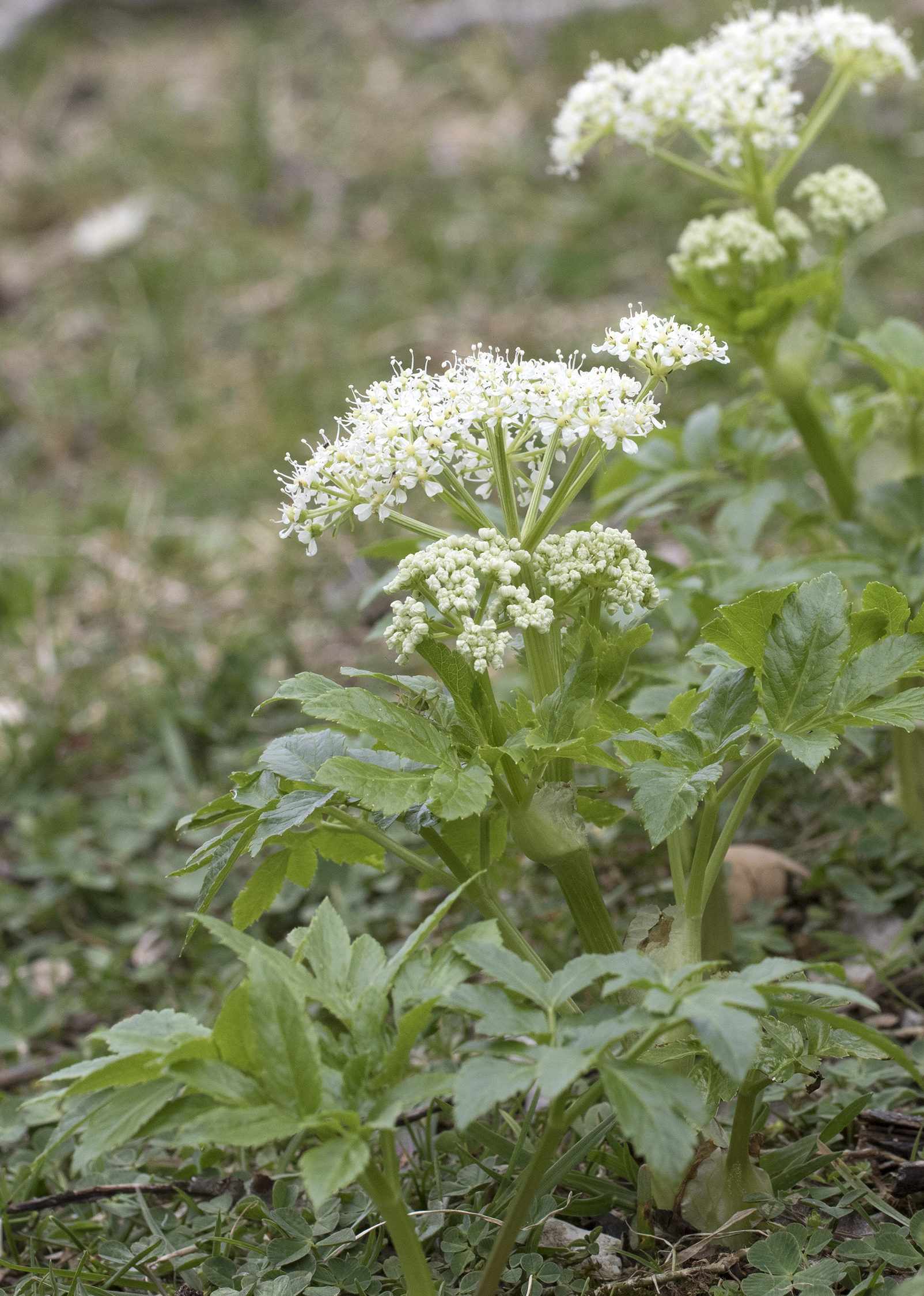
- Lecokia cretica in Turkey

Scientific classification
- Kingdom: Plantae
- Clade: Tracheophytes
- Clade: Angiosperms
- Clade: Eudicots
- Clade: Asterids
- Order: Apiales
- Family: Apiaceae
- Subfamily: Apioideae
- Tribe: Smyrnieae
- Genus: Lecokia; DC.
- Species: L. cretica

Binomial name
- Lecokia cretica (Lam.) DC.

Synonyms
- Apolgusa Raf.; Conilaria Raf.; Apolgusa cretica (Lam.) Raf.; Athamanta cervariifolia Viv. ex Steud.; Cachrys cretica Lam.; Conilaria cretica (Lam.) Raf.; Scandix latifolia Sm.

= Lecokia =

Species of flowering plant

Lecokia is a monotypic genus of flowering plants belonging to the family Apiaceae. It just contains one species, Lecokia cretica (Lam.) DC.

It is native to Cyprus, the East Aegean Islands, Iran, Crete, Lebanon, Palestine, South Caucasus (of Armenia, Georgia and Azerbaijan), Syria, and Turkey.

The genus name of Lecokia is in honour of Henri Lecoq (1802–1871), a French botanist. The genus has 2 known synonyms: Apolgusa Raf. and Conilaria Raf.

The Latin specific epithet of cretica means "coming from Crete", where the plant was found. Both the genus and the species were first described and published in Coll. Mém. Vol.5 on page 67 in 1829.
