= Timeline of Lyon =

The following is a timeline of the history of the city of Lyon, France.

== Prior to 15th century ==
- 43 BCE - Roman colony of Lugdunum founded.
- 15 BCE - Ancient Theatre of Fourvière built (approximate date).
- 10 BCE - Birth of Claudius.
- 59 CE - Town was burned and rebuilt with funding from Nero.
- 177 CE - Persecution in Lyon.
- 197 - Battle of Lugdunum.
- 478 - Became the capital of the Kingdom of the Burgundians.
- 1170s - Religious Waldensians active.
- 1180 - Lyon Cathedral construction begins.
- 1245 - First Council of Lyon convenes.
- 1272-1274 - Second Council of Lyon convenes.
- 1300 - University of Lyon founded.
- 1307 - Lyon becomes part of France under Philip the Fair .
- 1320 - "Citizens obtained self-rule."
- 1381 - Public clock installed.
- 1383 - Lyon astronomical clock in operation in the cathedral (approximate date).

== 15th-18th centuries ==
- 1420 - Trade fairs authorized.
- 1454 - Hôtel-Dieu de Lyon (hospital) in operation.
- 1473 - Printing press in operation.
- 1476 - Lyon Cathedral completed.
- 1498 - Maison du Chamarier built.
- 1506 - Stock exchange opens.
- 1515 - Silk industry in Lyon begins.
- 1519 - Collège de la Trinité founded.
- 1531 - Hospice de la Charite founded.
- 1540 - Printers' strike.
- 1548 - Henry II of France and Catherine de' Medici visit city.
- 1600 - Marriage of Henry IV of France and Marie de' Medici.
- 1617 - Hospice de la Charite church built.
- 1652 - Hôtel de Ville built.
- 1655 - Premiere of Molière's L'Étourdi ou les Contretemps.
- 1700 - Académie des sciences, belles-lettres et arts de Lyon established.
- 1702 - Chamber of Commerce founded.
- 1704 - Currency court established.
- 1711 - Flood.
- 1724 - Academy of fine arts established.
- 1731 - Lyon Public Library established.
- 1744 - "Silkworkers' revolt."
- 1750 - Saint-Clair (quarter) development begins.
- 1761 - Veterinary School of Lyon founded.
- 1771 - Conseil Superieur established.
- 1775
  - 20 January: Birth of André-Marie Ampère.
  - Saint-Clair bridge opens.
- 1778 - Masonic Rectified Scottish Rite founded in Lyon.
- 1784 - Montgolfiere hot air balloon ascends from Brotteaux.
- 1786 - Weavers' strike.
- 1788 - City directory published.
- 1790 - City becomes part of the Rhône-et-Loire souveraineté.
- 1792 - The first version of the Théâtre des Célestins is inaugurated.
- 1793
  - Revolt of Lyon against the National Convention; crackdown.
  - City becomes part of the Rhône department.
  - Population: 102,167.

== 19th century ==
=== 1800s-1840s ===
- 1802 - Jacquard loom invented in Lyon.
- 1803
  - Museum of Fine Arts of Lyon opens.
  - Temple du Change (church) active.
- 1806 - Labor court established.
- 1807 - Cemetery of Loyasse established.
- 1808 - University established.
- 1814 - March: Austrians in power.
- 1815 - 8 March: Napoleon arrives.
- 1820 - Population: 115,841.
- 1822
  - Société linnéenne de Lyon formed.
  - Catholic Society for the Propagation of the Faith founded in Lyon.
- 1825 - Statue of Louis XIV installed in the Place Bellecour.
- 1830 - Société académique d'architecture de Lyon founded.
- 1831 - November–December: Canut revolt.
- 1834 - April: Canut revolt.
- 1835 - Revue du Lyonnais journal begins publication.
- 1836 - Brasserie Georges in business.
- 1840 - 4 November: Flood.
- 1842 - Courthouse built.
- 1848
  - Le Salut public newspaper begins publication.
  - Église Saint-Georges (church) rebuilt.
- 1849 - June: Canut revolt.

=== 1850s-1890s ===
- 1850 - 15 August: "Banquet to Louis Napoleon."
- 1852 - Arrondissements of Lyon created: 1st, 2nd, 3rd, 4th, and 5th.
- 1854 - Gare de Lyon-Vaise opens.
- 1855 - Gare de Lyon-Perrache opens.
- 1856
  - Flood.
  - Society of African Missions founded in Lyon.
  - Population: 292,721.
- 1857 - École centrale de Lyon founded.
- 1858 - Lyon–Geneva railway in operation.
- 1859 - Le progrès newspaper begins publication.
- 1860
  - Philharmonic Society founded.
  - Palais de la Bourse built.
- 1861
  - African Museum of Lyon established.
  - Population: 318,803.
- 1862 - Funicular railway begins operating.
- 1863 - Crédit Lyonnais (bank) founded.
- 1864 - Grande synagogue de Lyon built.
- 1867 - 6th arrondissement of Lyon created.
- 1872 - Société botanique de Lyon established.
- 1875 - Union générale bank and Catholic University of Lyon established.
- 1876 - Gare de Lyon-Saint-Paul opens.
- 1877 - Théâtre des Célestins opens.
- 1879 - Le Nouvelliste de Lyon newspaper begins publication.
- 1880 - Le Monde lyonnais newspaper begins publication.
- 1883
  - Trial of Lyon anarchists
  - Église du Bon-Pasteur (church) built.
- 1884 - Basilica of Notre-Dame de Fourvière built.
- 1886 - Population: 401,930.
- 1888 - Association générale des étudiants of Lyon established.
- 1890 - Republican monument erected in Place Carnot.
- 1891 - Croix-Rousse funicular begins operating.
- 1892 - Fontaine Bartholdi installed in Place des Terreaux.
- 1894
  - 29 April: Exposition internationale et coloniale (1894) opens.
  - 24 June: Assassination of French president Carnot.
  - 25 June: "Anti-Italian riots."
  - Metallic tower of Fourvière and Théâtre de l’Eldorado built.
- 1899 - Lyon Olympique Universitaire football club formed.
- 1900 - Statue of Carnot erected in the Place de la République.

== 20th century ==
=== 1900-1944 ===
- 1902 - Revue d'histoire de Lyon journal begins publication.
- 1903
  - July: 1903 Tour de France passes through Lyon.
  - Revue musicale de Lyon begins publication.
- 1905
  - Orchestre National de Lyon established.
  - Édouard Herriot becomes mayor.
- 1906 - Population: 430,186 city; 472,114 commune.
- 1908 - Gare des Brotteaux opens.
- 1911 - Population: 523,796.
- 1912 - 7th arrondissement of Lyon created.
- 1914 - Exposition internationale urbaine de Lyon held.
- 1917 - Berliet automobile manufactory in business.
- 1921 - Montluc prison built.
- 1926 - Stade de Gerland (stadium) opens.
- 1933 - Pathe Bellecour cinema opens.
- 1940 - June: City occupied by German forces during the Battle of the Rhône Valley.
- 1941 - Odeon of Lyon excavation begins.
- 1944 - 2 September: Allied forces take city from Germans.

=== 1945-1990s ===
- 1952
  - Tunnel de la Croix-Rousse opens.
  - SaintéLyon Saint-Étienne-Lyon footrace begins.
  - Positif film magazine begins publication.
- 1959 - 8th arrondissement of Lyon created.
- 1964
  - 9th arrondissement of Lyon created.
  - Printing Museum established.
- 1968 - Population: 527,800.
- 1969 - Urban Community of Lyon and Ballet de l'Opéra de Lyon established.
- 1971 - Claude Bernard University Lyon 1 established.
- 1973 - Jean Moulin University Lyon 3 established.
- 1974 - Lyon metro Line C begins operating.
- 1975
  - Gallo-Roman Museum of Lyon building opens.
  - Airport Lyon Saint-Exupéry opens.
  - Population: 456,716.
- 1978 - Lyon Metro Line A and Line B begin operating.
- 1980 - Conservatory of Music and Dance established.
- 1982
  - PLM Law effected.
  - Population: 413,095.
- 1983
  - TGV hi-speed railway begins operating.
  - Opéra National de Lyon founded.
  - Gare de Lyon-Part-Dieu opens.
- 1987 - 11 May: Barbie Trial begins.
- 1989 - Michel Noir becomes mayor.
- 1991 - Lyon Metro Line D begins operating.
- 1993 - Opéra Nouvel opens.
- 1995
  - Musée d'art contemporain de Lyon building opens.
  - Raymond Barre becomes mayor.
- 1997 - Gare de Lyon-Vaise rebuilt.
- 1999 - Population: 445,452.

== 21st century ==
=== 2000s ===
- 2001
  - March: Lyon municipal election, 2001 held.
  - Gérard Collomb becomes mayor.
  - Tram lines T1 and T2 begin operating.
- 2005 - Vélo'v bikeshare begins operating.
- 2006 - Tram line T3 begins operating.
- 2008 - Pathe Vaise cinema opens.
- 2009 - Tram line T4 begins operating.

=== 2010s ===
- 2011 - Population: 491,268.
- 2012
  - Tram-train de l'ouest lyonnais begins operating.
    - Tram line T5 begins operating.
- 2014
  - March: Lyon municipal election, 2014 held.
  - Musée des Confluences opens.
- 2015
  - Metropolis of Lyon established per MAPAM Law.
  - 26 June: Saint-Quentin-Fallavier attack occurs in vicinity of Lyon.
  - December: Auvergne-Rhône-Alpes regional election, 2015 held.
- 2016 - Lyon becomes part of the Auvergne-Rhône-Alpes region.
- 2019
  - Tram line T6 begins operating.
  - 31 August: Mass stabbing kills one and injures eight.

== See also ==
- History of Lyon
- List of mayors of Lyon
- List of heritage sites in Lyon
- Other names of Lyon
- History of Rhône department

Other cities in the Auvergne-Rhône-Alpes region

- Timeline of Clermont-Ferrand
- Timeline of Grenoble
- Timeline of St Etienne
- Timeline of Vienne

== Bibliography ==
=== in English ===
- Abraham Rees (1819), "Lyons", The Cyclopaedia, London: Longman, Hurst, Rees, Orme & Brown
- J. Willoughby Rosse (1859). "Lyons". Index of Dates ... Facts in the Chronology and History of the World. Bohn's reference library. London: H.G. Bohn. hdl:2027/hvd.32044098621048.
- William Henry Overall, ed. (1870). "Lyons". Dictionary of Chronology. London: William Tegg. hdl:2027/uc2.ark:/13960/t9m32q949.
- "Lyons" . Encyclopædia Britannica. Vol. 17 (11th ed.). 1910. pp. 174–176.
- Benjamin Vincent (1910), "Lyons", Haydn's Dictionary of Dates (25th ed.), London: Ward, Lock & Co.
- "Lyons", Southern France (6th ed.), Karl Baedeker, 1914, hdl:2027/uc1.31822019077254
- Daniel C. Haskell, ed. (1922), "Provencal literature and language, including the local history of southern France", Bulletin of the New York Public Library, vol. 26, hdl:2027/mdp.39015035117657, "Local history: Lyons"
- "Lyons Journal; For a Staid City, Neo-Gaullism With Gallic Verve", New York Times, 10 April 1989
- Trudy Ring, ed. (1995). "Lyons". Northern Europe. International Dictionary of Historic Places. Fitzroy Dearborn. ISBN 978-1-136-63944-9.
- Pierre Claude Reynard (2009). "Chronological Landmarks". Ambitions Tamed: Urban Expansion in Pre-revolutionary Lyon. McGill-Queen's University Press. ISBN 978-0-7735-7574-5.

=== in French ===
- "Lyon". Almanach général des marchands, négocians, armateurs et fabricans (in French). Paris: L. Cellot. 1779. ISSN 1954-6521.
- Almanach astronomique et historique de la ville de Lyon (in French). 1788.
- "Rhone: Lyon". Annuaire des artistes français: Statistique des beaux-arts en France (in French). Paris: Guyot de Fère. 1833. ISSN 2275-6817.
- Jean-Baptiste-Joseph Champagnac [in French] (1839). "Lyon". Manuel des dates, en forme de dictionnaire (in French). Perisse frères.
- Dictionnaire-Indicateur, ou le Guide indispensable de l'étranger à Lyon (in French). Nigon. 1843.
- Eusèbe Girault de Saint-Fargeau [in French] (1850). "Lyon". Guide pittoresque: portatif et complet, du voyageur en France (in French) (3rd ed.). Paris: Firmin Didot frères. p. 441. hdl:2027/uiug.30112081968700.
- Charles-Joseph Chambet (1860). Lyon descriptif, monumental et industriel de la ville de Lyon (in French) (11th ed.). chez P. Paris. ISBN 978-0-461-84595-2.
- Annuaire administratif et commercial de Lyon et du département du Rhône, 1868
- Guide-indicateur de Lyon (in French). Coste-Labaume. 1881.
- Almanach du Lyonnais (in French). Lyon: Legendre. 1903.
- Sébastien Charléty [in French] (1903). Bibliographie critique de l'histoire de Lyon, depuis 1789 jusqu'à nos jours. Annales de l'universite de Lyon (in French).
- "Lyon". Lyonnais & Velay. À la France: sites et monuments (in French). Paris: Touring-Club de France. 1903. OCLC 457600236.
- Syndicat d'initiative de Lyon (1906). Lyon pittoresque (in French). J. Poncet.
- "Lyon". Bourgogne, Morvan, Nivernais, Lyonnais. Guides Joanne (in French). 1907. hdl:2027/uc1.$b192332.
