= Timeline of Saint-Étienne =

The following is a timeline of the history of the city of Saint-Étienne, France.

== Prior to 20th century ==
- 1184 – Church of Notre-Dame de Valbenoîte founded.
- 1310 – Grand'Église de Saint-Étienne (church) construction begins.
- 1790 – Town becomes part of the Rhône-et-Loire department.
- 1793 – Town becomes part of the Loire (department).
- 1800 – Population: 16,259.
- 1816 – École nationale supérieure des mines de Saint-Étienne (school) established.
- 1828 – Saint-Étienne to Andrézieux Railway begins operating.
- 1830 – Hôtel de Ville (City Hall) completed.
- 1831 – Lyons-St Etienne railway begins operating.
- 1855 – Beaubrun, Montaud, Outre-Furan, and Valbenoîte become part of Saint-Étienne.^{(fr)}
- 1856 – Loire (department) administration relocated to Saint-Étienne from Montbrison.
- 1861 – Musée d'art et d'industrie de Saint-Étienne opens in the Palais des Arts.
- 1863 – Planfoy becomes part of Saint-Étienne.^{(fr)}
- 1864 – Manufacture d'armes de Saint-Étienne factory built.
- 1876 – Union des travailleurs de Saint-Étienne (labour union) consumers' co-operative created.
- 1881 – Saint-Étienne tramway begins operating.
- 1884 – Gare de Saint-Étienne-Châteaucreux rebuilt.
- 1886 – Population: 117,875.
- 1890 – Lycée Claude-Fauriel (school) built.
- 1898 – Société des Magasins du Casino (shop) in business.
- 1900 – Hôtel de préfecture de la Loire built.

== 20th century ==
- 1901 – Automobile Club established.
- 1902 – Saint-Étienne labour council building constructed.
- 1910 – Etoile Théâtre (cinema) opens.
- 1911 – Population: 148,656.
- 1922 – Cinémathèque de Saint-Étienne established.
- 1923 – Saint-Étienne Cathedral built.
- 1926 – Population: 193,737.
- 1930 – Histoire et Patrimoine de Saint-Étienne founded.
- 1933 – Maisons sans escalier (residence) built.
- 1938 – Capitole cinema opens.
- 1942 – Trolleybuses in Saint-Étienne in operation.
- 1952 – SaintéLyon Lyon-St Etienne footrace begins.
- 1962 – Population: 210,311.
- 1968 – Population: 223,223.
- 1969
  - Jean Monnet University established.
  - Saint-Victor-sur-Loire and Terrenoire become part of Saint-Étienne.^{(fr)}
- 1971 – École nationale supérieure d'architecture de Saint-Étienne (school) established.
- 1973 – Rochetaillée becomes part of Saint-Étienne.^{(fr)}
- 1977
  - March: Saint-Étienne municipal election, 1977 held.
  - Joseph Sanguedolce becomes mayor.
- 1978 – Saint-Étienne–Bouthéon Airport terminal built.
- 1981 – Radio Dio begins broadcasting.
- 1987 – Modern Art Museum established.
- 1990
  - Massenet Festival begins.
  - Population: 199,396.
- 1993 – Médiathèque Centrale opens in Tarentaize.
- 1995 – Festival des 7 Collines de Saint-Étienne (cultural festival) begins.

== 21st century ==
- 2005 – Conservatoire à rayonnement régional de Saint-Étienne (music school) active.
- 2011 – Population: 170,049.
- 2014
  - March: Saint-Étienne municipal election, 2014 held.
  - Gaël Perdriau becomes mayor.
- 2015 – December: Auvergne-Rhône-Alpes regional election, 2015 held.
- 2016 – St Etienne becomes part of the Auvergne-Rhône-Alpes region.

== Images ==
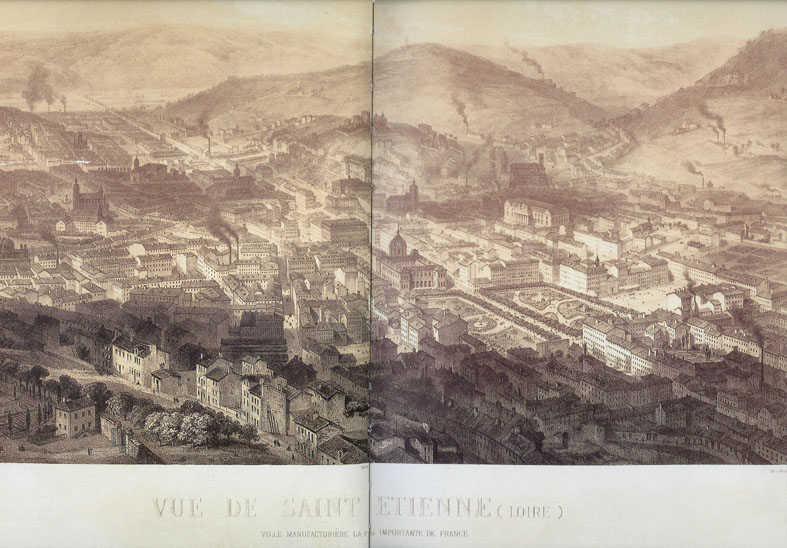
Aerial view of St Etienne, 1860

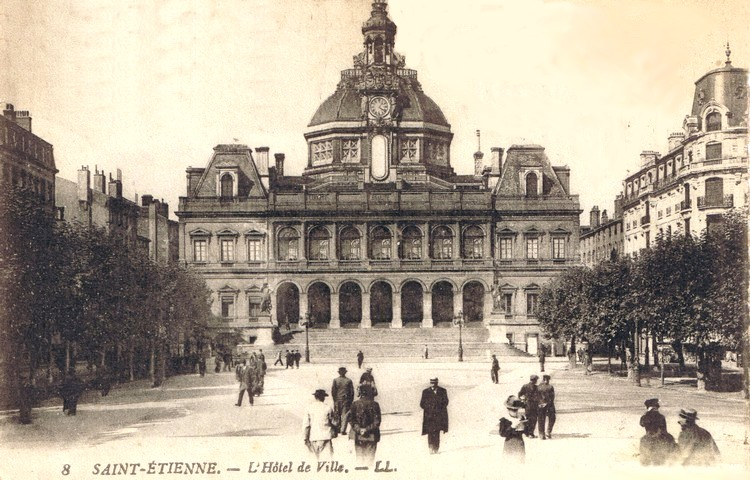
City Hall, built 1821, with addition of dome in 1864

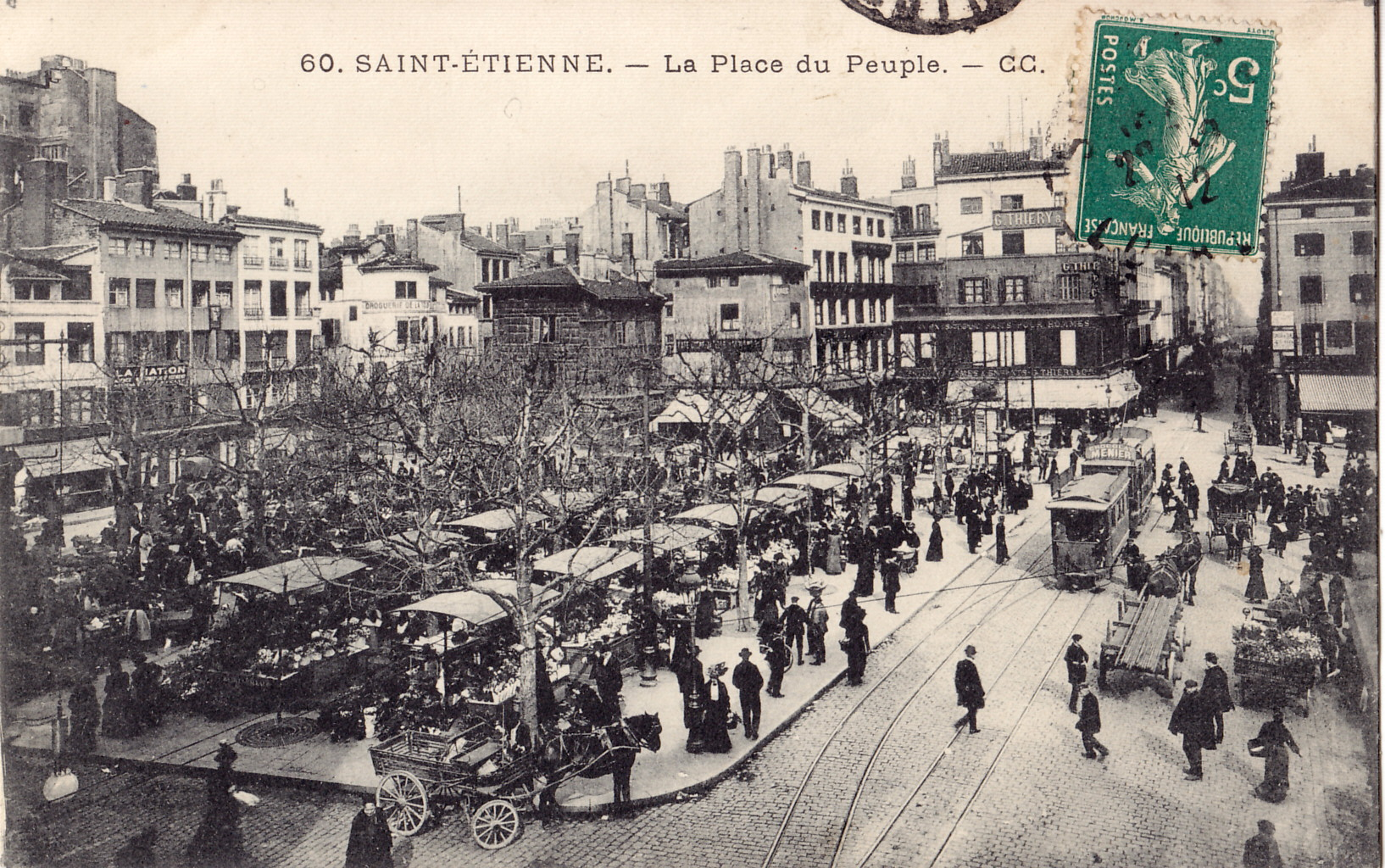
Place du Peuple with tram, which began operating in 1881 (photo circa 1912)

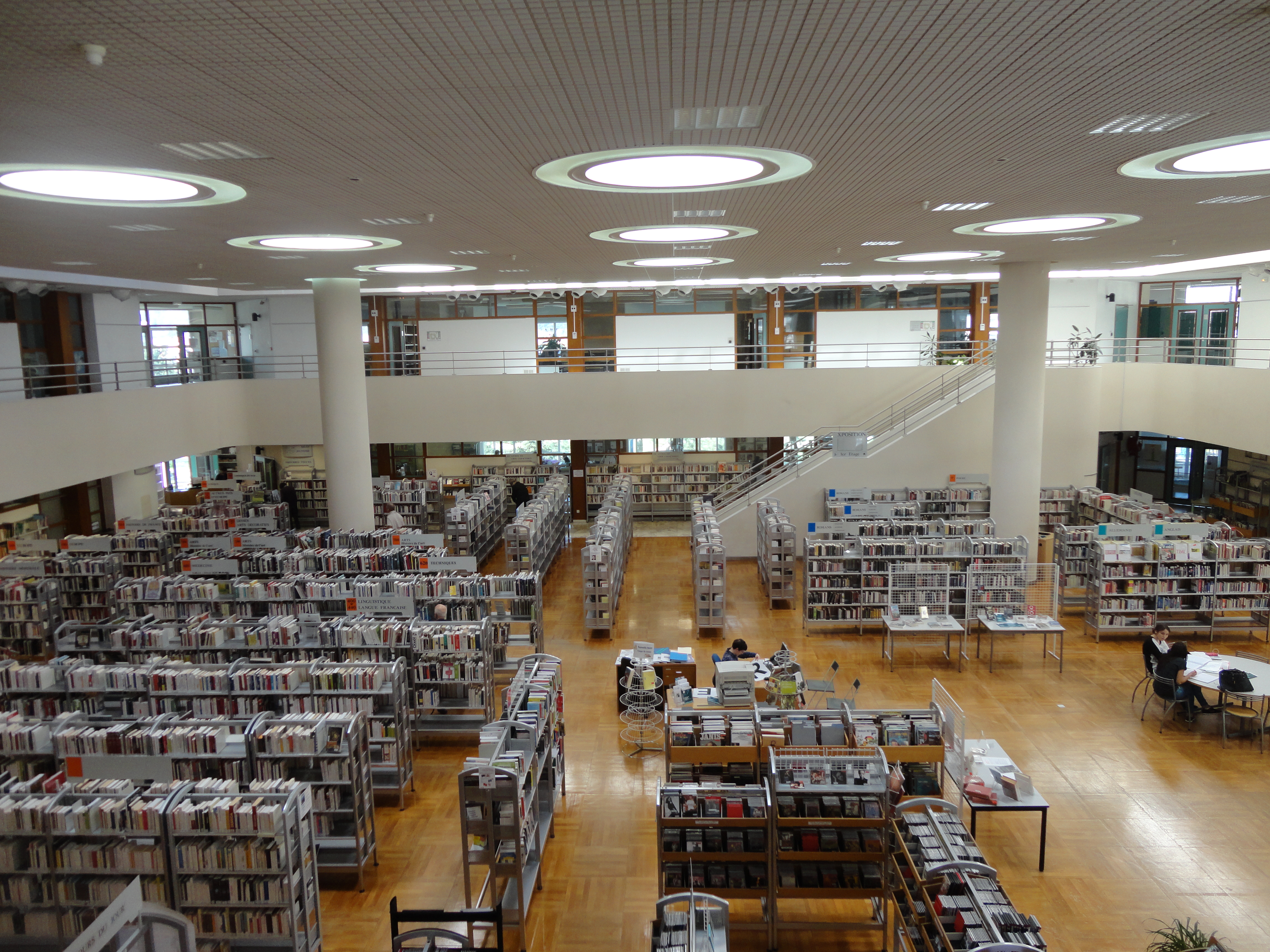
Médiathèque Centrale, opened in 1993

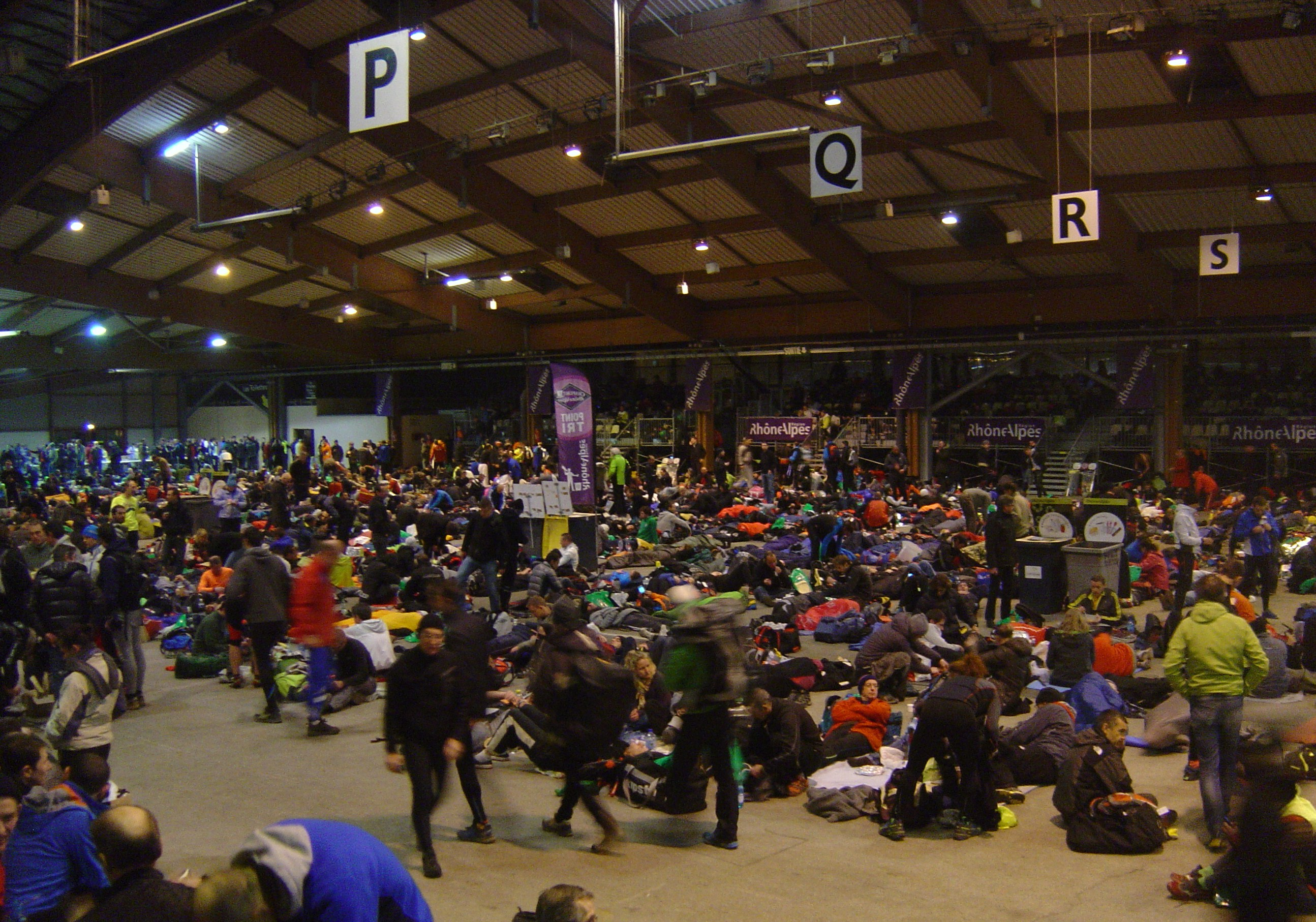
Participants before the start of the SaintéLyon footrace, December 2013

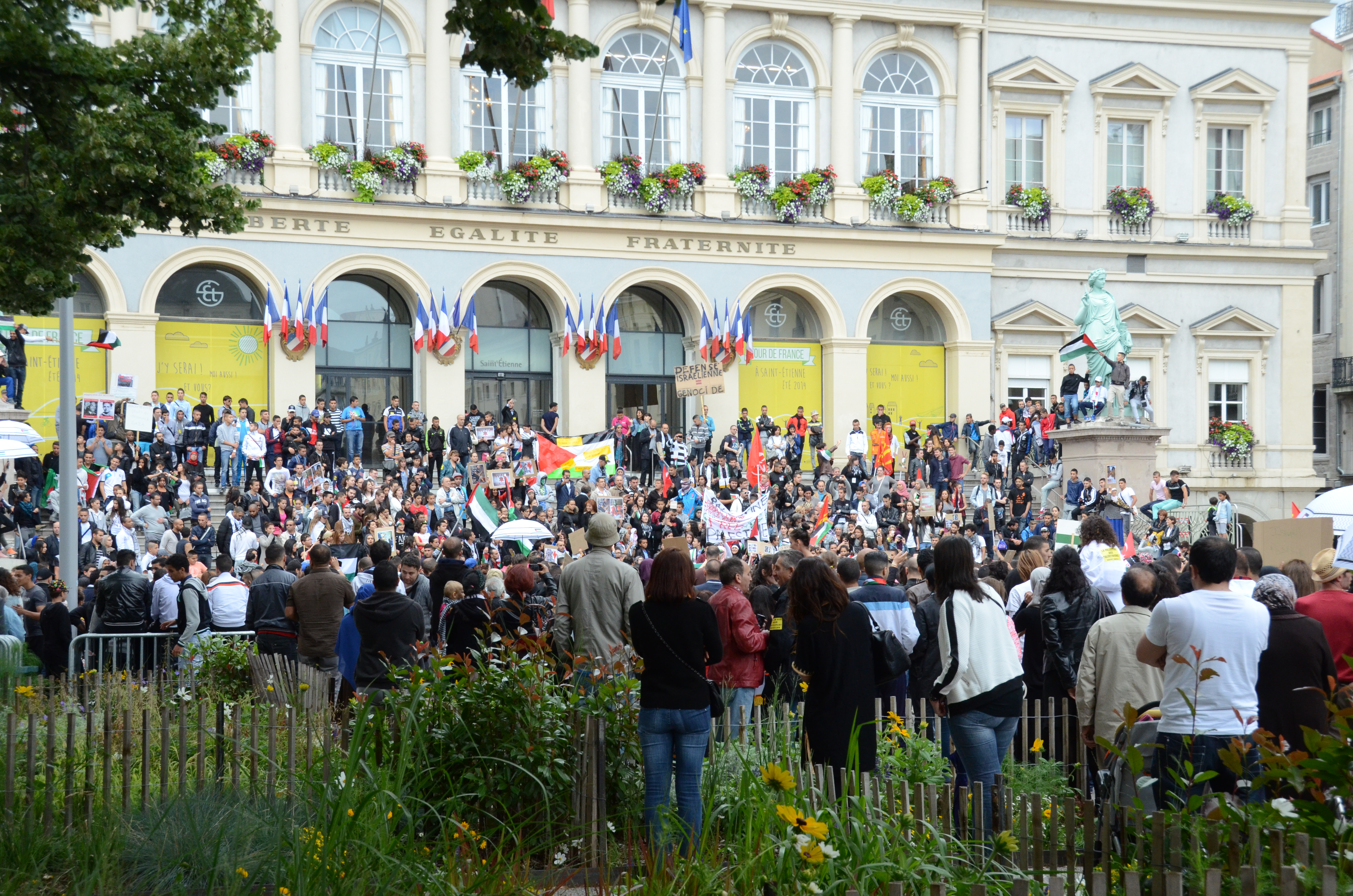
Pro-Palestinian rally at City Hall, July 2014

== See also ==
- List of mayors of Saint-Étienne
- List of heritage sites in Saint-Étienne

other cities in the Auvergne-Rhône-Alpes region

- Timeline of Clermont-Ferrand
- Timeline of Grenoble
- Timeline of Lyon
- Timeline of Vienne

== Bibliography ==
=== in English ===
- Clement Cruttwell (1793). "S. Etienne-en-Forez". Gazetteer of France. London: G.G.J. and J. Robinson. hdl:2027/njp.32101072026824.
- "St Étienne" . Encyclopædia Britannica. Vol. 24 (11th ed.). 1910. pp. 2–3.
- "St-Etienne", Southern France (6th ed.), Leipzig: Baedeker, 1914, hdl:2027/uc1.31822019077254
- Hugh D. Clout (1972). "Lyons/Saint-Etienne Metropolis". Geography of Post-War France. Elsevier. pp. 98–106. ISBN 978-1-4831-5318-6.

=== in French ===
- Eusèbe Girault de Saint-Fargeau [in French] (1850). "St. Etienne". Guide pittoresque: portatif et complet, du voyageur en France (in French) (3rd ed.). Paris: Firmin Didot frères. p. 462. hdl:2027/uiug.30112081968700.
- Association française pour l'avancement des sciences [in French] (1897). Saint-Etienne (in French). Société de l'imprimerie Théolier.
- Archives d'architecture de la Loire; Centre d'études foréziennes (1995). Les Lamaizière: architectes à Saint-Étienne, 1880–1925 (in French). Université de Saint-Etienne. ISBN 978-2-86272-091-3.
- Frédéric Zarch (2000). Catalogue des films projetés à Saint-Étienne avant la première guerre mondiale (in French). Université de Saint-Etienne. ISBN 978-2-86272-182-8.
- Blandine Devun (2005). La vie culturelle à Saint-Etienne pendant la deuxième guerre mondiale, 1939-1944 (in French). Université de Saint-Etienne. ISBN 978-2-86272-366-2.
