= Arboretum de Royat =

Arboretum in Auvergne, France

Coordinates: 45.755°N 3.024°E

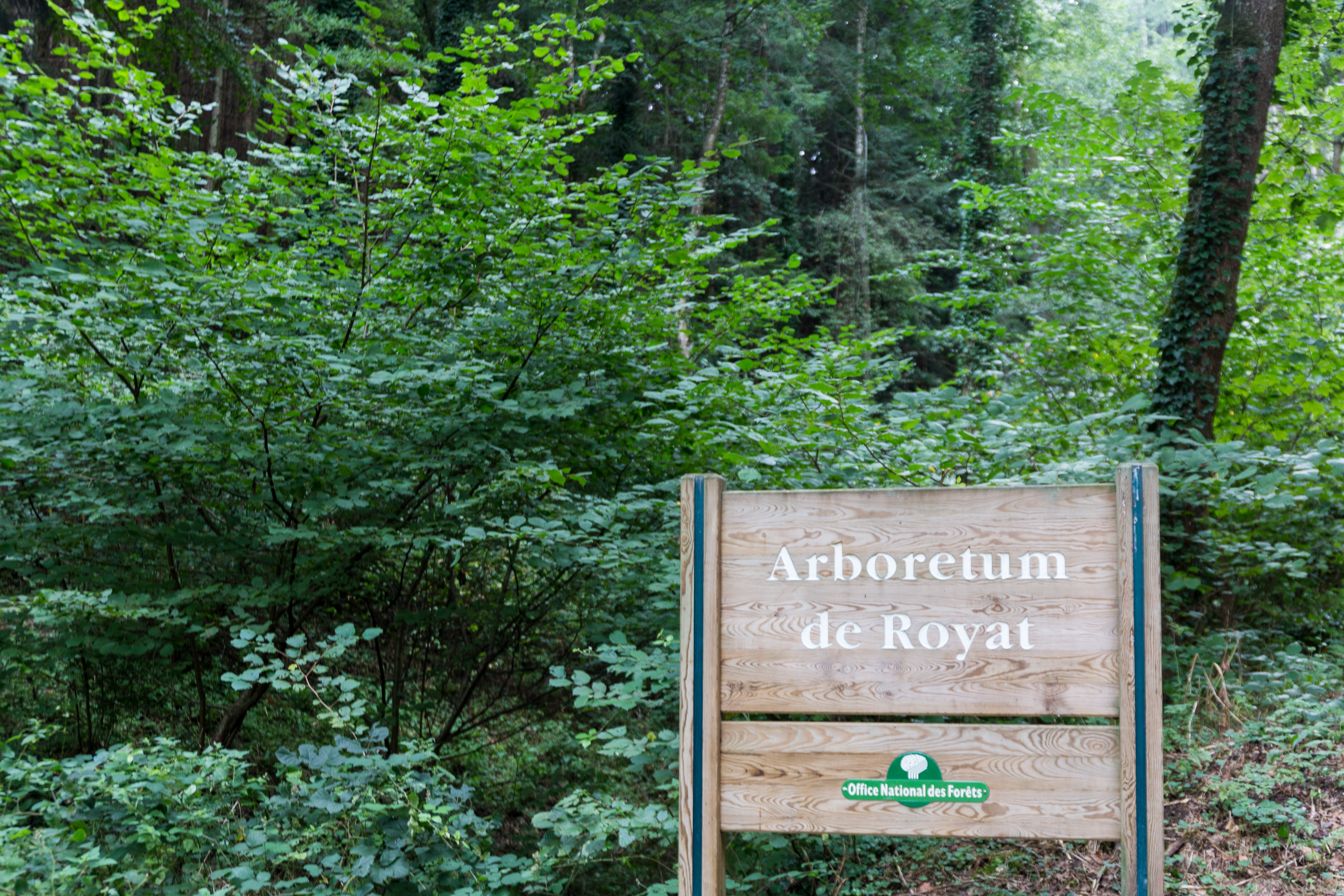

The Arboretum de Royat (41 hectares) is an arboretum located in the forêt domaniale southwest of Royat, Puy-de-Dôme, Auvergne, France.

Royat is a spa town at the foot of the Parc des Volcans d'Auvergne and the Puy-de-Dôme, developed from 1850 onwards. The arboretum was established in 1931, and currently contains walking paths through over 40 types of trees, including conifers from North America and Europe such as Douglas fir, larch, and Lawson cypress. It is managed by the Office National des Forêts.

== See also ==
- List of botanical gardens in France

== Links ==
- Assenac, Gilbert; Michel, Ducrey (1974). A propos de l'arboretum de Royat : climatologie et potentialités de production forestière [About the Arboretum in Royat : climatology and forest production potentialities] (in French). Nancy: Ecole nationale du génie rural, des eaux et des forêts.
- Arboretum de Royat on clermontauvergnetourisme.com
- L’arboretum de Royat, un endroit insolite pour des escapades variées en toute liberté on La Montagne, 01/08/2014
