= List of mayors of Grenoble =

This is a list of mayors of Grenoble.

== Mayors from 1790 to 1904 ==
- Joseph Marie de Barral (02/1790-08/1790)
- Antoine Barnave (08/1790-11/1790)
- Daniel d'Isoard (11/1790-11/1791)
- Léonard Joseph Prunelle de Lierre (11/1791-12/1792)
- Joseph Marie de Barral (12/1792-05/1794)
- Victor Dumas (05/1794-10/1794)
- Pierre-François Arthaud (1794-1795)
- Joseph Martin (1795-1798)
- Jean-Baptiste Berthier (1798-1800)
- Joseph Marie de Barral (1800-1800)
- Charles Renauldon (1800-1815)
- Pierre Giroud (1815-1816)
- marquis Jean-François de Pina de Saint-Didier (1816-1818)
- Antoine Royer-Deloche (1818-1820)
- marquis Charles Laurent Joseph Marie de La Valette (1820-1823)
- Marc Louis Gautier (1823-1824)
- marquis Jean-François de Pina de Saint-Didier (1824-1830)
- Félix Penet (1830-1831)
- Vincent Rivier (1831-1835)
- Honoré-Hugues Berriat (1835-1842)
- comte Artus de Miribel (1842-1845)
- Frédéric Marc Joseph Taulier (1845-1848)
- Frédéric Farconnet (1848-1848)
- Ferdinand Reymond (1848-1848)
- Adolphe Anthoard (1848-1849)
- Frédéric Taulier (1849-1851)
- Joseph Arnaud (1851-1853)
- Louis Crozet (1853-1858)
- Eugène Gaillard (1858-1865)
- Jean-Thomas Vendre (1865-1870)
- Adolphe Anthoard (1870-1871)
- Napoléon Dantart (1871-1871)
- Jean-Marie Farge (1871-1871)
- Ernest Calvat (1871-1874)
- Félix Giraud (1874-1875)
- Auguste Gaché (1875-1881)
- Édouard Rey (1881-1888)
- Auguste Gaché (1875-1881)
- Félix Poulat (1896-1896)
- Stéphane Jay (1896-1904)

== Mayors from 1904 to present ==
Image	Mayor	Term start	Term end	Party
	Charles Rivail	1904	1908	I
	Félix Viallet	1908	1910	Independent
	Nestor Cornier	1910	1919	Independent
	Paul Mistral	1919	1932	SFIO
	Léon Martin	1932	1935	SFIO
	Paul Cocat	1935	1944	Miscellaneous right
	Frédéric Lafleur	1944	1945	French Resistance
	Léon Martin	1945	1947	SFIO
	Marius Bally	1947	1948	Independent
	Raymond Perinetti	1948	1949	French Communist Party
	Léon Martin	1949	1959	SFIO
	Albert Michallon	1959	1965	Union for the New Republic
	Hubert Dubedout	1965	1983	Socialist Party
	Alain Carignon	1983	1995	Rally for the Republic
	Michel Destot	1995	April 4, 2014	Socialist Party
	Éric Piolle	April 4, 2014	Incumbent	Europe Ecology – The Greens

== See also ==
- Timeline of Grenoble
