= Henri Lecoq =

French botanist (1802–1871)

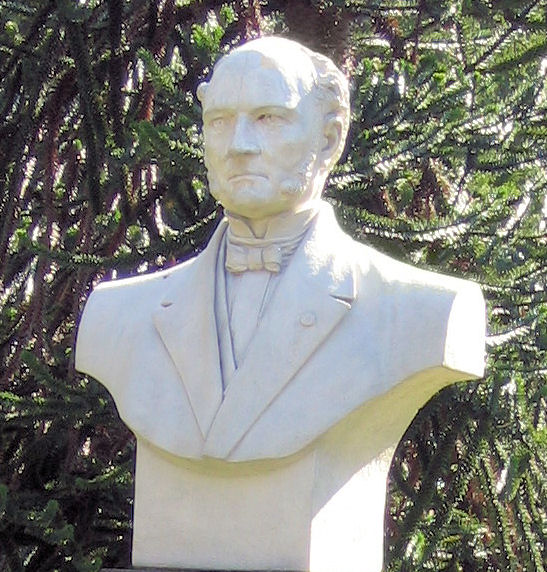
- Born: 18 April 1802
- Died: 4 August 1871 (aged 69)
- Notable work: Étude de la Géographie Botanique de l'Europe
- Scientific career
- Fields: botany

Henri Lecoq (18 April 1802 – 4 August 1871) was a French botanist. Charles Darwin mentioned this name in 1859 in the preface of his famous book On The Origin of Species as a believer in the modification of species. Darwin wrote:

A well-known French botanist, M. Lecoq, writes in 1854 ('Etudes sur Géograph. Bot.,' tom. i. p. 250), 'On voit que nos recherches sur la fixité ou la variation de l'espèce, nous conduisent directement aux idées émises, par deux hommes justement célèbres, Geoffroy Saint-Hilaire et Goethe.' Some other passages scattered through M. Lecoq's large work, make it a little doubtful how far he extends his views on the modification of species.

The work referenced by Darwin is Lecoq's Étude de la Géographie Botanique de l'Europe, published in 1854.

A number of plants carry the name of Lecoq in their descriptive names (see IPNI search). Also in 1829, botanist DC. published Lecokia, a monotypic genus of flowering plants belonging to the family Apiaceae with its name honouring him.

In addition a museum in his home town of Clermont Ferrand (France) is named after him.
