= Ceyrat =

- Commune
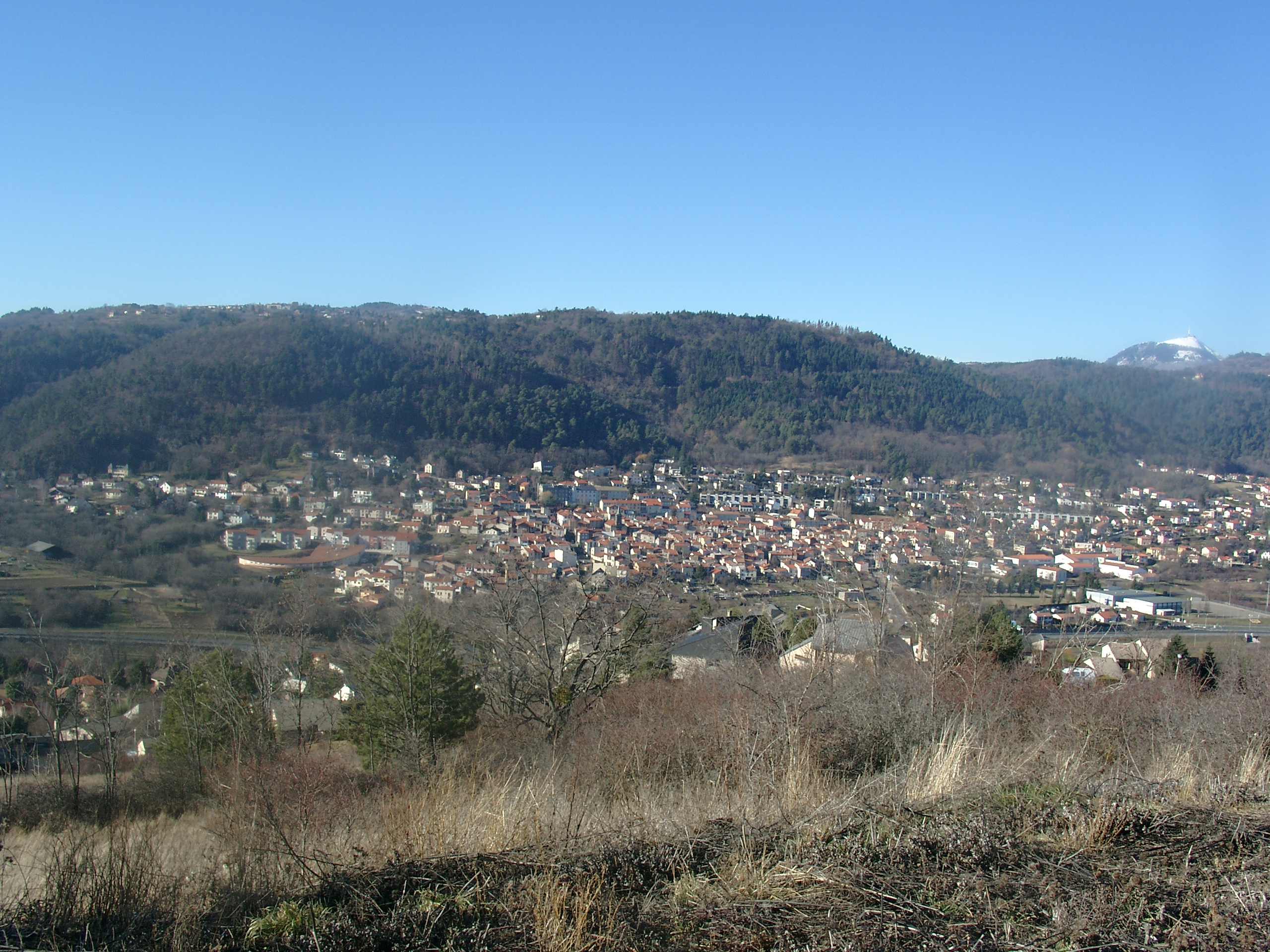
- A general view of Ceyrat

- Coat of arms
- Location of Ceyrat
- Location within France Location within Auvergne-Rhône-Alpes
- Coordinates: 45°44′01″N 3°03′50″E
- Country: France
- Region: Auvergne-Rhône-Alpes
- Department: Puy-de-Dôme
- Arrondissement: Clermont-Ferrand
- Canton: Beaumont
- Intercommunality: Clermont Auvergne Métropole

Government
  - Mayor (2026–32): Éric Égli
- Area^{1}: 9.35 km^{2} (3.61 sq mi)
- Highest elevation: 804 m (2,638 ft)
- Lowest elevation: 428 m (1,404 ft)
- Population (2023): 6,592
  - Density: 705/km^{2} (1,830/sq mi)
- Demonym: Ceyratois
- Time zone: UTC+01:00 (CET)
  - Summer (DST): UTC+02:00 (CEST)
- INSEE/Postal code: 63070 /63122
- ^{1} French Land Register data, which excludes lakes, ponds, glaciers > 1 km^{2} (0.386 sq mi or 247 acres) and river estuaries.

Ceyrat (French pronunciation: [sɛʁa]; Auvergnat: Ceirat) is a commune in the Puy-de-Dôme department in Auvergne-Rhône-Alpes in central France.

It is twinned with the English village of Great Waltham.

== Population ==
Historical population
Year	Pop.	±% p.a.
1968	2,850	—
1975	4,000	+4.96%
1982	4,727	+2.41%
1990	5,283	+1.40%
1999	5,593	+0.64%
2007	5,435	−0.36%
2012	5,667	+0.84%
2017	6,416	+2.51%
2023	6,592	+0.45%
Source: INSEE

== See also ==
- Communes of the Puy-de-Dôme department
- Roman theater of Montaudou
