= Guides Pol =

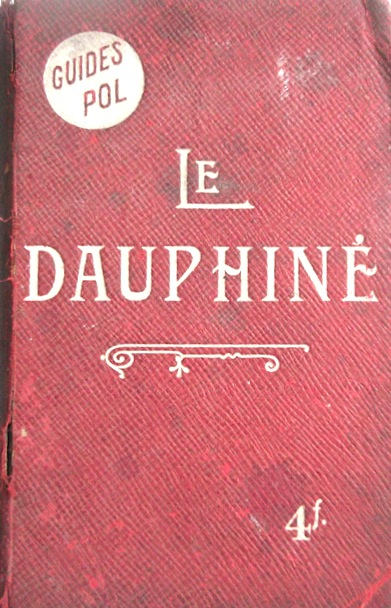
Cover of guide to the Dauphiné, 1899

Guides Pol (French pronunciation: [ɡid pɔl]) or Pol's Guides (est.1896) was a series of travel guide books to France and Switzerland. Gustave Toursier oversaw the enterprise.
