= Royat =

- Commune
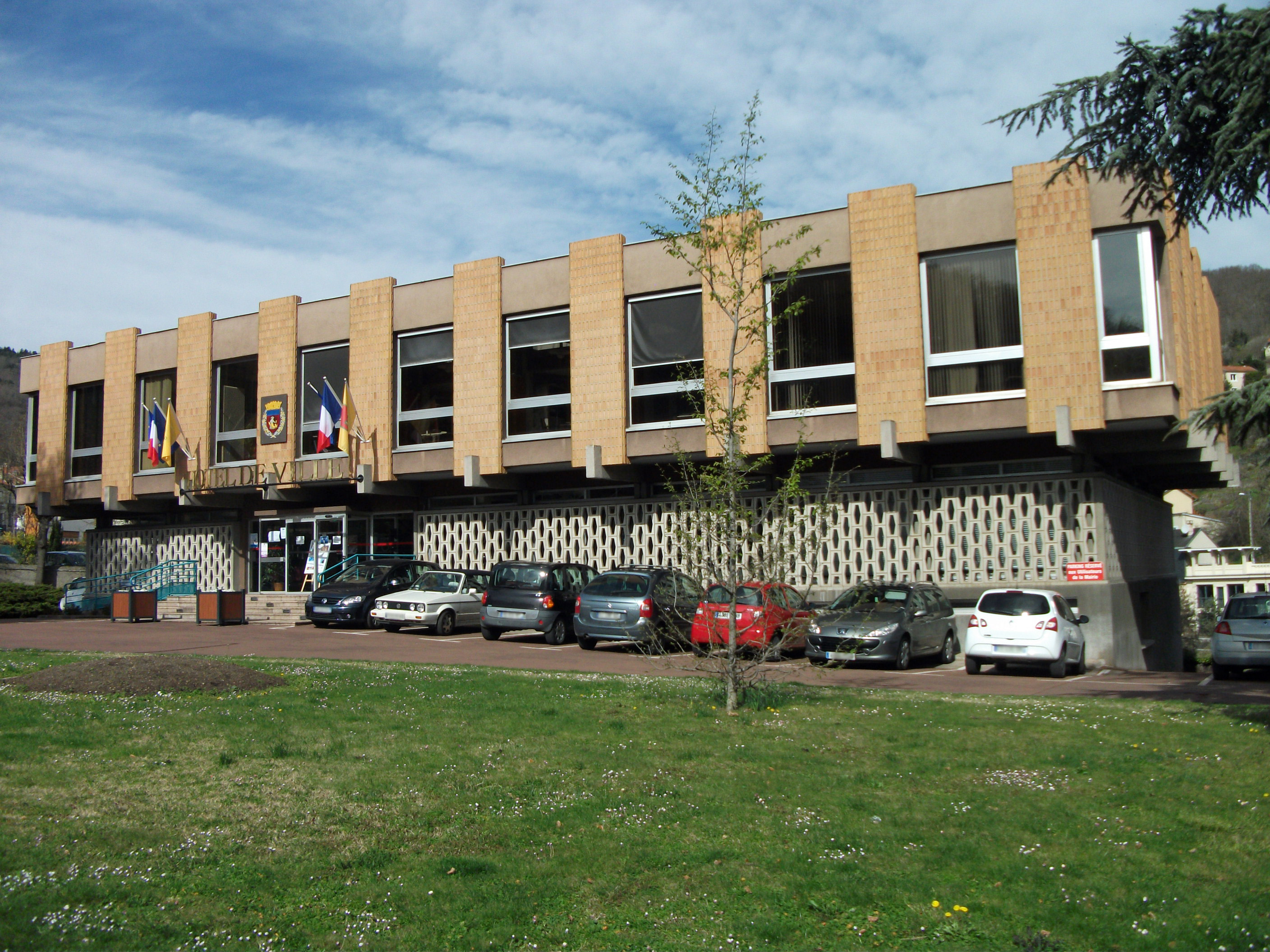
- The town hall in Royat

- Coat of arms
- Location of Royat
- Location within France Location within Auvergne-Rhône-Alpes
- Coordinates: 45°45′54″N 3°03′00″E
- Country: France
- Region: Auvergne-Rhône-Alpes
- Department: Puy-de-Dôme
- Arrondissement: Clermont-Ferrand
- Canton: Chamalières
- Intercommunality: Clermont Auvergne Métropole

Government
  - Mayor (2020–2026): Marcel Aledo
- Area^{1}: 6.62 km^{2} (2.56 sq mi)
- Elevation: 728 m (2,388 ft)
- Highest elevation: 904 m (2,966 ft)
- Lowest elevation: 457 m (1,499 ft)
- Population (2023): 4,479
  - Density: 677/km^{2} (1,750/sq mi)
- Time zone: UTC+01:00 (CET)
  - Summer (DST): UTC+02:00 (CEST)
- INSEE/Postal code: 63308 /63130
- ^{1} French Land Register data, which excludes lakes, ponds, glaciers > 1 km^{2} (0.386 sq mi or 247 acres) and river estuaries.

Royat (French pronunciation: [ʁwaja]; Occitan: Roiat) is a commune in the Puy-de-Dôme department in Auvergne-Rhône-Alpes in central France.

Since Roman times, its thermal springs have made it a spa town, and the remains of the Roman baths are still visible.

== Population ==
Historical population
Year	Pop.	±% p.a.
1968	4,416	—
1975	4,467	+0.16%
1982	4,072	−1.31%
1990	3,950	−0.38%
1999	4,658	+1.85%
2007	4,613	−0.12%
2012	4,590	−0.10%
2017	4,651	+0.26%
2023	4,479	−0.63%
Source: INSEE

== Points of interest ==
- Arboretum de Royat
- Jardin botanique d'Auvergne

== International relations ==
Royat is twinned with Abertyleri, Blaenau Gwent, Wales.

== See also ==
- Communes of the Puy-de-Dôme department
