= Montferrand (district of Clermont-Ferrand) =

City district of Clermont-Ferrand

Coordinates: 45.7930°N 3.1135°E

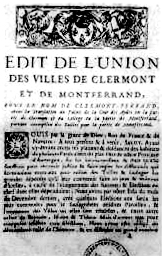
Edict of union between the towns of Clermont and Montferrand

Montferrand (French: [mɔ̃fɛʁɑ̃], Occitan: [mumfeˈra]) is a district of the modern town of Clermont-Ferrand in Auvergne. Its origin is in the former town of Montferrand, the rival of Clermont for many centuries until their union, decreed on 15 April 1630 by the edict of Troyes (first edict of union) and confirmed and effected in 1731 by Louis XV's second edict of union. Wishing to regain independence, Montferrand asked for it in 1789, 1848 and 1863.
