= Place de Jaude =

Coordinates: 45.77659°N 3.08206°E

- Public square
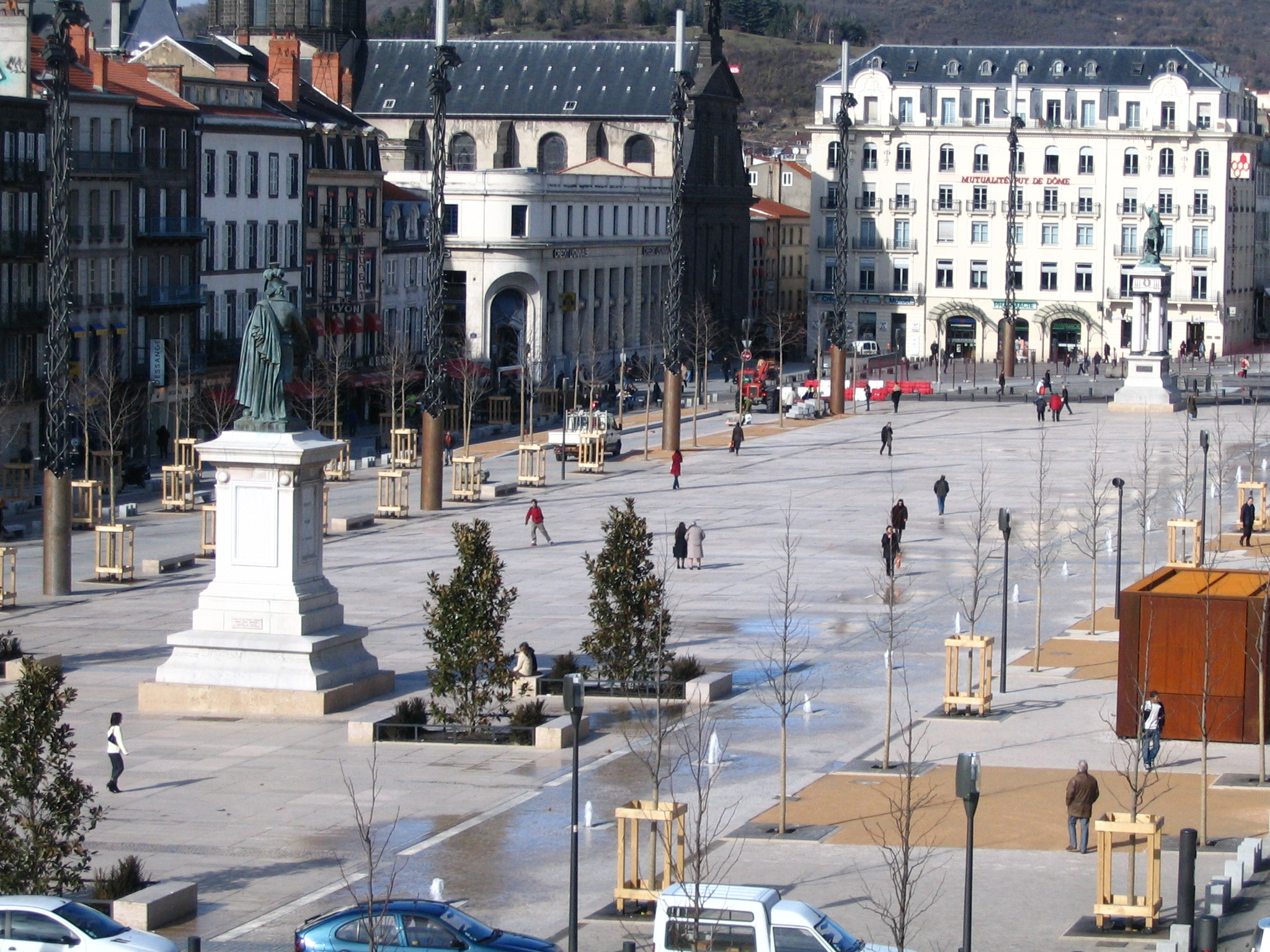

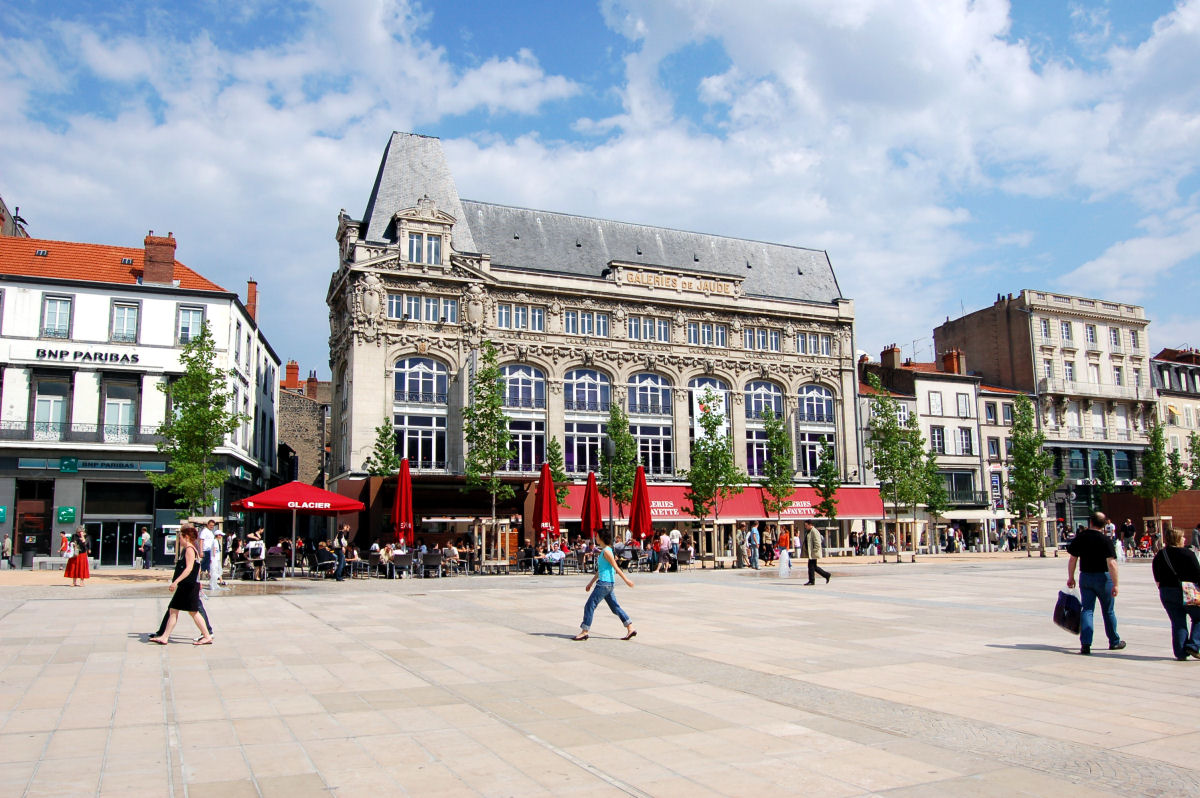
- Interactive map of Place de Jaude
- Country: France
- Region: Auvergne (region)
- Department: Puy-de-Dôme
- Arrondissement: Clermont-Ferrand
- Transit Services: Place de Jaude
- Shape: Rectangular
- Area (Metres Squared): 35 000

Jaude Square (French: Place de Jaude) is a major city square and meeting place in the centre of Clermont-Ferrand, France. It is bordered by Rue Blatin on the North and Avenue Julien on the south. The square is home to many attractions, such as the Opera Theatre, the Jaude Shopping Mall and Saint-Pierre-des-Minimes Church.

Jaude Square was founded in the Roman times but was abandoned in the Middle Ages.

Overlooking the square is a massive statue of the ancient Gallic leader Vercingetorix. Erected in 1903, it was created by Frédéric Auguste Bartholdi, who also made the Statue of Liberty.

The modern square was inaugurated on 17 June 2006, with over 30,000 people coming to attend the opening ceremony.

== History ==
=== A Roman commercial suburb ===
As the excavations carried out during the construction of the Fond de Jaude (1978), Carré Jaude I (1995) and Carré Jaude II (2009-2010) have shown, the plain of Jaude, almost devoid of construction in the Middle Ages, was on the contrary a densely urbanized sector during Roman times. Archaeological research shows that the Place de Jaude was a public district, a place of passage and merchant. This proto-square was parallel to the hill of Clermont, which hosts the forum under the current Place de la Victoire and the cathedral.

=== The Middle Ages ===
In the Middle Ages, the square was a vast, unsuitable swampy area (it was in fact an old crater lake), bordered in the west by a branch of the South Tiretaine, fitted to serve tanneries and mills, in the north and east by the limit of the urbanized sector. The only elevated building in the depression was then the chapel of Jaude, in the southwest of the square.

=== Modern era ===
The Saint-Pierre-des-Minimes church was built in 1630. In 1663 a fountain and a pond were installed. In 1750, the square was transformed into a fairground to sell horses and firewood.

=== Urbanization of the square in the 19th and 20th centuries ===
In the 19th century, the square became a popular place to walk for the inhabitants. On the east side of the square, the Halle aux Toiles, built in 1812, was transformed to accommodate a large theater in 1894. Two monuments were erected: the statue of General Desaix in 1848 and the equestrian statue of Vercingétorix in 1903.

The Café de Paris (1839), the Café Riche, the Grand café Lyonnais, the Café de L'Univers later opened their terraces on the square. The commercial orientation of the square was confirmed in the 20th century, with the opening of the Paris-Clermont store (the current Crédit commercial de France building) built in 1900, then with one of the Galeries de Jaude in 1907 (which became Galeries Lafayette in April 1997) which quickly supplant their competitors. In the 1960s and 1970s, the square was renovated in the south: the Fond de Jaude district was destroyed to make way, in 1980, for a large shopping center, the Jaude Centre.

=== The square during the 1980s ===
A parking lot was dug under the northern part of the square. Above, a bus station and a T2C shop are located. Almost all of the city buses pass through the square. Two ponds with water jets were created in 1985 in the center of the square, which is bordered by green spaces and magnolias. Near the Jaude Centre, a park is decorated with a fountain designed by the sculptor Jean Chauchard.

=== The current place ===
The municipal council decided on the 24th of September 1999 to completely redo the square and install a first tramway line. The development project made by the winning team of the international architecture and landscape competition of Alain Marguerit (Atelier des Paysages Alain Marguerit), Bernard Paris (Atelier d'Architecture Bernard Paris), Jean-Max Llorca (fountain engineer), LEA (Laurent Fachard, lighting technician).

The project recalls the facilities which existed in the 19th century. A space mainly reserved for pedestrians and tree lanes (141 in total) between which the new Clermont-Ferrand tramway has passed since November 13, 2006.

The square is almost entirely reserved for pedestrians. Vehicles cross it only from east to west between boulevard Desaix and rue Blatin or from west to east from avenue Julien. The northern part is made up of a dark basalt forecourt illuminated at night by 250 red and yellow diodes which symbolize the movement of lava. The rest of the square is paved with light limestone.

The work began in January 2003 and was completed in late 2005 at a cost of 15 million euros. The square reopened to the public on the 10th of December 2005 in the presence of 30,000 people and was inaugurated on the 17th of June 2006.
