= List of castles in Gloucestershire =

There are numerous castles in Gloucestershire, a county in South West England. They consist of motte-and-baileys, fortified manor houses, ringwork, and ring-mottes. A motte-and-bailey castle has two elements, the motte is an artificial conical mound with a wooden stockade and stronghold on top, usually a stone keep or tower. A bailey is a defended enclosure below the motte, surrounded by a ditch. Motte-and-bailey castles were the most common type of castle in England following the Norman Conquest. Ringworks are similar to motte-and-baileys although lack the characteristic motte; across England they are an uncommon form of fortification but were popular in the west of Gloucestershire in the 11th century. A ring-motte is a ring-work with a raised centre. A shell keep was a motte with a stone wall rather than a wooden stockade on top; there would have been no tower within the walls.

The first wave of castle building in Gloucestershire occurred after the Norman invasion of 1066, with William FitzOsbern, the Earl of Hereford, given the initial responsibility for occupying Gloucestershire, Herefordshire and probably Worcestershire. FitzOsbern probably built the first castle at Gloucester, and pushed westwards to build the castle at Chepstow; other early castles were built in the Forest of Dean to shield the city of Gloucester from Welsh incursions. Many of these castles were abandoned soon after the conquest as security improved. To the south of Gloucestershire, Bristol Castle formed the next substantial fortification, with another network of castles in Herefordshire providing defence to the north. After the fall of FitzOsbern's son, Walter de Gloucester rose to power in the region, followed by his son, Miles de Gloucester. In the final years before the outbreak of the civil war of the Anarchy, the Gloucesters were extensively developing their primary castle at Gloucester. Gloucester was a key battleground in the conflict from 1139–53 between the rival rulers of Stephen and Empress Matilda. Warfare in England at the time centred on castles and attrition warfare and the largely pro-Angevin supporters of Matilda in Gloucestershire responded with a rush of castle-building. Many of these were destroyed by Stephen during the war, or after the conflict when Henry II attempted to restore royal control over these critical fortifications, although recent scholarship has indicated that less Gloucestershire castles were destroyed in the 1150s than once thought. In the 13th and 14th century, fortified manor houses became a more popular form of fortification. By the 16th century, most Gloucestershire castles were in disuse, although some, such as Gloucester and St Briavels remained in use as administrative centres or gaols. Several castles in Gloucestershire were damaged or slighted in the English Civil War from 1642–9. In the 18th and 19th century, prison reform brought an end to the use of Gloucestershire castles as gaols, leaving only a handful of occupied castles as private homes in the 21st century.

== List of castles ==
| Name | Type and date | Condition | Location | Picture |
|---|---|---|---|---|
| Berkeley Castle | Motte and bailey, 1067. | Private home of the Berkeley family, partially open to the public | Berkeley51.68797°N 2.45707°W | |
| Berkeley Castle | The first castle at Berkeley was built by William FitzOsbern. The castle was held for the Empress Matilda during the Anarchy, and was destroyed during the conflict. Rebuilt in 1153, the new castle included a shell keep and stone curtain wall. The castle became famous as the site of Edward II's suspicious death in 1327. The castle was damaged during the English Civil War and the Berkeley family was forbidden to repair it. Some remodelling of the castle was undertaken at the beginning of the 20th century. | | | |
| Beverstone Castle | Pentagonal bailey, before 1229 | Partially intact and used as a private home | Beverston51.64507°N 2.203009°W | |
| Beverstone Castle | Maurice de Gaunt constructed the original pentagonal castle before 1229 without a royal licence, but was granted a licence for the purpose of adding crenellation. In the early 14th century, Thomas, Lord Berkeley modified the castle, erecting a small quadrangular stronghold, with a twin-towered gatehouse. A smaller square tower was added in the late 15th century. The castle was slighted during the English Civil War, with the south range being retained as a private dwelling. | | | |
| Bledisloe Tump | Probable ringwork, 11th or 12th century | Destroyed | Awre51.771123°N 2.460089°W | |
| Bledisloe Tump | The castle was originally a simple timber structure. The site was chosen because it occupied a natural high point overlooking the River Severn. A later mound, 60 ft wide and 7 ft high was also constructed on the site, and it is suspected that this may have been an unfinished motte. The castle may have been destroyed by Henry II after the conflict as part of a wider programme of castle denigration in Gloucestershire during the 1160s. The remaining earthworks were destroyed during the 1970s. | | | |
| Brimpsfield Castle | Motte and bailey, 11th century | Earthworks and limited masonry | Brimpsfield51.814248°N 2.087721°W | |
| Brimpsfield Castle | It is likely that the first castle was built after the Norman invasion, before being rebuilt in stone in the 12th or 13th century. The owner, John Giffard, 2nd Lord of Brimpsfield, rebelled against King Edward II and was executed in 1322, the castle then being destroyed. | | | |
| Castle Hale | Unknown, early 12th century | Destroyed, covered by modern Painswick | Painswick51.78355°N 2.194933°W | |
| Castle Hale | A small Norman castle was built here by Pain fitzJohn, a later supporter of the Empress Matilda. It was destroyed in the 16th century to make way for a new court house. | | | |
| Castle Tump | Motte and bailey, 11th or 12th century | Earthworks | Dymock51.961876°N 2.42129°W | |
| Castle Tump | The castle motte today is 14 m high, with the traces of the bailey to the south-east. During the Anarchy the castle was given to William de Braose, the son-in-law of the powerful Miles de Gloucester. After the conflict the castle is believed to have probably been destroyed by Henry II as part of a wider programme of castle denigration in Gloucestershire during the 1160s. | | | |
| Cirencester Castle | Motte and bailey, 11th century | Destroyed, covered by modern Cirencester | Cirencester51.716275°N 1.970285°W | |
| Cirencester Castle | The castle was originally built in the 11th century in timber, with a square keep added in stone in 1107. The castle was of primarily local significance, being relatively small. During the Anarchy of the 12th century, the castle was seized in the early years of the conflict by Robert, Earl of Gloucester on behalf of the Empress Matilda. In 1142 King Stephen seized the castle in a surprise attack, setting fire to it afterwards. | | | |
| English Bicknor Castle | Motte and bailey, 11th century | | English Bicknor51.838779°N 2.608822°W | |
| English Bicknor Castle | The castle's motte lay at the centre of two concentric outer bailey walls, producing a roughly circular castle approximately 150 yards across. The motte was placed against the south-west corner of the site, where the ground fell away from the castle, giving additional protection from attack. A square stone keep may have been built at a later stage on the motte. At the start of years of the Anarchy the castle was controlled by the powerful Miles de Gloucester. The castle escaped destruction at the end of the conflict and was still in use at the beginning of the 13th century; its exact date of final ruin is unknown. | | | |
| Glasshouse Woods | Ringwork, 11th century | | Glasshouse51.889079°N 2.413343°W | |
| Glasshouse Woods | An early Norman fortification, designed to act in conjunction with the castles of Little Dean Camp and Howle Hill Camp as a screen to protect the city of Gloucester from military threats from Wales. | | | |
| Gloucester Castle | Motte and bailey, 11th century | Destroyed, covered by modern Gloucester Prison | Gloucester51.863464°N 2.250462°W | |
| Gloucester Castle | Built after the Conquest, the castle was enlarged by William Rufus and placed in the custody of the sheriff of the county, Roger of Gloucester. By 1112 Walter de Gloucester had built a new castle west of Barbican hill. During the Anarchy, Miles of Gloucester held the castle for Empress Matilda, and the castle was used to hold Stephen initially after his capture at the battle of Lincoln in 1141. Henry III often used it as a residence, and it played an important role in the barons' war. By 1228 the castle was acting as the county gaol. In the mid-15th century the castle ceased to be maintained as a fortress and was demolished to make way for a new prison during 1787-91. | | | |
| Hailes Castle | Unknown, 11th or 12th century | Destroyed, covered by ruins of Hailes Abbey | Stanway51.9698°N 1.92645°W | |
| Hailes Castle | The castle was built near the church of St Peters' in the village of Stanway. The castle was moated, although this has since been filled in. The castle was strengthened by Ralph of Worcester at the start of the difficult years of the Anarchy, with Hailes Castle playing a role in the conflict between 1139-45. The castle was probably demolished in the 1240s to make way for the construction of Hailes Abbey. | | | |
| Haresfield Mount | Motte and bailey, probable 12th century | Earthworks | Haresfield51.793277°N 2.276172°W | |
| Haresfield Mount | The castle has a square design, approximately 50m across, with a motte in the centre that was once at least 10 ft tall. The castle may have been owned by Earl Miles of Gloucester. Only earthworks now remain. | | | |
| Holme Castle | Unknown, 11th century | Earthworks | Tewkesbury51.988133°N 2.162518°W | |
| Holme Castle | By the 12th century this castle was owned by the Earls of Gloucester. In the 12th and 13th centuries the castle had "buildings of aristocratic proportions", but fell into disuse thereafter. Only limited earthworks still remain. | | | |
| Lasborough | Motte, 11th century | Earthworks | Lasborough51.645867°N 2.256486°W | |
| Lasborough | The castle has a motte 40 m wide, with no evidence of a bailey. It was probably intended to operate in conjunction with the nearby castle at Newington Bagpath. | | | |
| Little Camp Hill | Keep with baileys, 12th century | Earthworks | Lydney51.719463°N 2.555104°W | |
| Little Camp Hill | A Norman castle with inner and outer baileys and a square, stone keep, protected by the natural shape of the hill, all now destroyed. | | | |
| Littledean Camp | Ringwork with motte, 11th century | Earthworks | Lydney51.719463°N 2.555104°W | |
| Littledean Camp | This Norman castle was intended both to protecting the local villages and probably intended to operate with the castles at Glasshouse Woods and Howle Hill Camp as a screen to protect the city of Gloucester from military threats from Wales. The castle itself is circular and relatively small, some 60 ft in diameter, with an inner and an outer bailey, the latter protected by a very tall vallum wall. The outer wall was originally 15 ft tall. Uniquely for a castle of this period the outer wall has a motte integrated into the design, rather than located at the centre of the castle. Littledean castle was only occupied briefly. | | | |
| Miserden Castle | Motte and bailey with shell-keep, early 12th century | Earthworks and limited masonry | Miserden51.781885°N 2.081859°W | |
| Miserden Castle | The castle was built by Robert Musard overlooking the river Frome and included a 60 ft wide shell keep, protected by a stone wall and a moat. The castle is positioned on a rocky spur and would have been protected by a wet moat, further strengthening the considerable defences. Musard was killed by forces loyal to King Stephen during the years of the Anarchy and the castle seized by Philip of Gloucester, but the castle survived into at least the 13th century. | | | |
| Newington Bagpath Motte | Motte, 11th or early 12th century | Earthworks | Bagpath51.651239°N 2.266635°W | |
| Newington Bagpath Motte | The castle was built on steep, prominent ground, and comprised a 150 ft wide motte and keep. The castle had no bailey, but possessed a possible small gatehouse to the north. It was probably intended to operate in conjunction with the nearby castle at Lasborough. | | | |
| Newnham on Severn Castle House | Ringwork, 11th century | Earthworks | Newnham on Severn51.801411°N 2.451623°W | |
| Newnham on Severn Castle House | An 11th-century Norman ringwork, at maximum 190 ft across, and abandoned by the 12th century. Only earthworks remain. | | | |
| Ruardean Castle | Fortified manor house, 13th century | Earthworks and limited masonry | Ruardean51.857709°N 2.553392°W | |
| Ruardean Castle | Alexander de Bykemore was granted a licence to crenellate the castle in 1310. The manor included a courtyard, internal buildings, a gatehouse and a curtain wall. It is possible that the original 13th-century structure may have more closely resembled a Norman castle than a manor house. It was positioned on a spur above two valleys, surrounded by additional earthworks probably built as part of the same manor project. | | | |
| South Cerney Castle | Motte and bailey, mid-12th century | Earthworks | South Cerney51.677822°N 1.933358°W | |
| South Cerney Castle | A small Norman castle, built by Miles of Gloucester during the Anarchy to protect the strategically useful village of South Cerney along the river Churn. Stephen's forces captured the castle in 1139. The subsequent fate of the castle is unknown and only slight earthwork remains exist today. | | | |
| Stow Green | Ring-motte, 11th century | 11th century, earthworks | St Briavels51.755038°N 2.632323°W | |
| Stow Green | The castle is a small circular fortification, once measuring 35 yards across, now only 25 yards, with a high motte, or mound, in the middle and a protective ditch around it. The entrance to the castle was on the south side of the fortification. The castle would have defended the Stowe valley, and was probably a precursor to the later St Briavels Castle in the same area. | | | |
| St Briavels Castle | Square keep and bailey, between 1075–1129 | Largely intact, owned by English Heritage and used as a Youth Hostel. | St Briavels51.7388°N 2.642233°W | |
| St Briavels Castle | St Briavels Castle|St Briavels was constructed by Walter and Miles de Gloucester on behalf of the crown as the administrative centre of the Forest of Dean. It was held by Miles on behalf of Empress Matilda during the Anarchy and retained by Henry II after 1153 as a royal castle. In the 13th century the castle became first a favourite hunting lodge of King John, and then the primary centre in England for the manufacture of crossbow quarrels. The castle slowly declined and by the 1830s was a notorious debtors' prison. | | | |
| Sudeley Castle | Mid-15th century double-courtyard Quadrangular castle | Intact, privately owned and open to the public | Winchcombe51.947338°N 1.957039°W | |
| Sudeley Castle | The castle was originally created by John de Sudeley, who fortified an existing manor house at the start of the Anarchy. John held the castle in support of the Empress, and in 1139 the castle was seized and later destroyed by Stephen, although the local manor farm remained. A new castle was rebuilt adjacent to the original building in the late 15th century in a more substantial style, but was slighted following the English Civil War in 1649. The current castle is the result of extensive Victorian restoration. | | | |
| Taynton Castle | Ring-motte, 11th or 12th century | Earthworks | Taynton51.888174°N 2.414788°W | |
| Taynton Castle | A Norman castle, roughly 25m across. | | | |
| Upper Slaughter Castle | Motte and bailey, mid-12th century | Earthworks | Upper Slaughter51.907569°N 1.773921°W | |
| Upper Slaughter Castle | The castle during the Anarchy, making use of raised ground and incorporating part of the church of St Peters into the fortification. The castle was approximately 22m wide. | | | |
| Weston Park | Motte and bailey, 11th or 12th century | Earthworks | Weston Park52.052415°N 1.830066°W | |
| Weston Park | The castle's 8 ft high motte, or mound, remains on this site. | | | |
| Winchcombe Castle | Motte and bailey, 1140 or 1144. | Destroyed, covered by modern Winchcombe | Winchcombe51.951837°N 1.96722°W | |
| Winchcombe Castle | The castle was built during the chaos of the Anarchy in the north-east of Winchcombe, then a key region of the conflict, and rested on a high motte, or mound. The castle was built by Roger, Earl of Hereford, a supporter of the Empress Matilda, but was attacked in late 1144 by forces loyal to King Stephen in a direct assault. The castle was destroyed after the attack and was not rebuilt. | | | |

== Bibliography ==
- Amt, Emilie. (1993) The Accession of Henry II in England: royal government restored, 1149-1159. Woodbridge, UK: Boydell Press. ISBN 978-0-85115-348-3.
- Bradbury, Jim. (2009) Stephen and Matilda: the Civil War of 1139-53. Stroud, UK: The History Press. ISBN 978-0-7509-3793-1.
- Clarke, Benjamin. (1852) The British Gazetteer: Political, Commercial, Ecclesiastical, and Historical. London: Collins.
- Curnow, P.E. and E.A. Johnson. (1985) "St Briavels Castle," in Chateau Gaillard: études de castellologie médiévale. Caen: Centre de Recherches Archéologiques Médiévales. ISBN 978-2-902685-01-1.
- Friar, Stephen. (2003) The Sutton Companion to Castles. Stroud: Sutton Publishing. ISBN 978-0-7509-3994-2.
- Heighway, Carolyn. (1985) Gloucester: a History and Guide. Gloucester, UK: Alan Sutton. ISBN 0-86299-256-7.
- King, David James Cathcart. (1988) The Castle in England and Wales: an Interpretive History. Beckenhem, UK: Croom Helm. ISBN 978-0-918400-08-6.
- Lindley, E. S. (1954) "Wotton under Edge Notes," in Transactions of the Bristol and Gloucestershire Archaeological Society, 1954, Vol 73.
- Pettifer, Adrian. (1995) English Castles: A Guide by Counties. Woodbridge, UK: Boydell Press. ISBN 978-0-85115-782-5.
- Pounds, Norman John Greville. (1990) The Medieval Castle in England and Wales: a social and political history. Cambridge: Cambridge University Press. ISBN 978-0-521-45828-3.
- Remfry, P.M. Saint Briavels Castle, 1066 to 1331. Worcester, UK: SCS Publishing. ISBN 1-899376-05-4.
- Renn, Derek Frank. (1968) Norman castles in Britain. London: Baker.
- Rowley, Trevor. (1997) Norman England. Batsford and English Heritage. ISBN 0-7134-8060-2.
- Rushford and Knowles. (1931) "Proceedings at the Annual Meeting held at Cirencester," in Transactions of the Bristol and Gloucestershire Archaeological Society, 1931, Vol. 52.
- Scott-Garrett, C. "Littledean Camp," in Transactions of the Bristol and Gloucestershire Archaeological Society, 1958, Vol. 77.
- Steane, John M. (1985) The Archaeology of Medieval England and Wales, Volume 1985, Part 2. Beckenhem, UK: Croom Helm. ISBN 978-0-7099-2385-5.
- Thomas, William Heard. (1839) Tinterne and its Vicinity. Bristol: Hamilton and Adams.
- Verey, David and Alan Brooks. (2002) Pevsner Architectural Guide, Gloucestershire 2: The Vale and The Forest of Dean. New Haven, US: Yale University Press. ISBN 0-300-09733-6.
- Walker, David. "Gloucestershire Castles," in Transactions of the Bristol and Gloucestershire Archaeological Society, 1991, Vol. 109.
