= Hailes, Gloucestershire =

Village in Gloucestershire, England

Coordinates: 51.9695°N 1.9281°W

Hailes
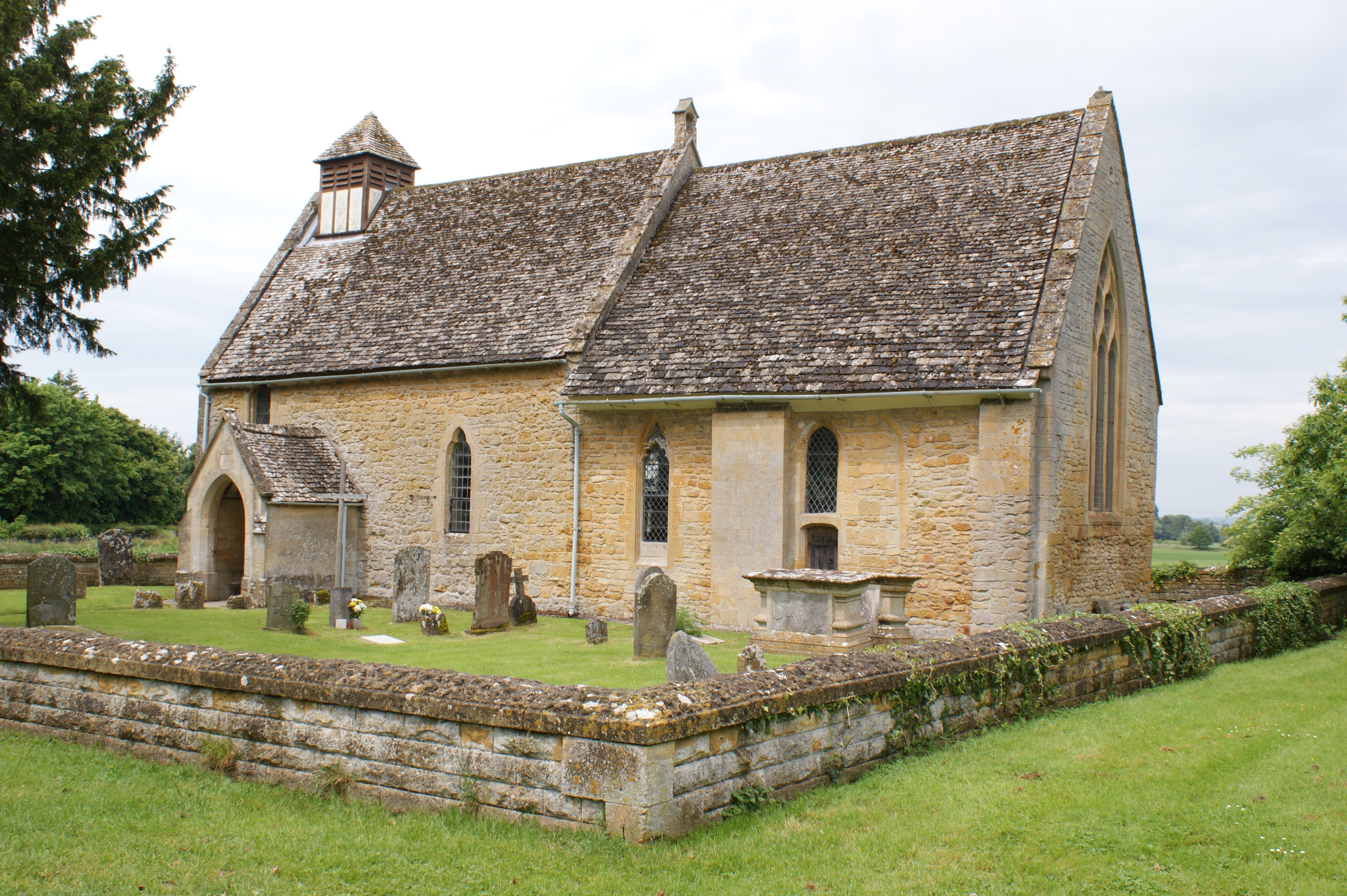
- Hailes church

- Location within Gloucestershire
- Civil parish: Stanway
- District: Tewkesbury
- Shire county: Gloucestershire
- Region: South West
- Country: England
- Sovereign state: United Kingdom
- Post town: Cheltenham
- Postcode district: GL54
- Police: Gloucestershire
- Fire: Gloucestershire
- Ambulance: South Western

Hailes (also spelt Hayles) is a village in the civil parish of Stanway, in the Tewkesbury district, in Gloucestershire, England, 2 miles (3.2 km) north-east of Winchcombe. The village lies at the foot of the Cotswold escarpment. The remains of Hailes Abbey, a Cistercian abbey active from 1246 to 1539, are here.

Hailes was mentioned in the Domesday Book of 1086, in the form Heile. The toponym is of unknown origin. One toponymist has suggested that the name derives from an unrecorded British name for the stream flowing through the village, Saliā ("the dirty one").

In the 11th or early 12th century, Hailes Castle was built here, but was probably demolished in the 1240s to make way for the construction of Hailes Abbey.

Hailes was a chapelry of the ancient parish of Didbrook, and became a separate parish in 1837. In 1866 it became a civil parish. On 1 April 1935 the civil parish of Hailes was abolished, and merged with Stanway and Toddington. In 1931 the parish had a population of 83.

Between 1928 and 1960 the village was served by Hayles Abbey Halt railway station on the Honeybourne Line. The station was reopened in 2017 to serve the heritage Gloucestershire Warwickshire Steam Railway.

== Hailes Church ==
The parish church (dedication unknown) was consecrated in 1175. It later served as the capella ante portas (Latin for 'chapel outside the gates') to Hailes Abbey until the Abbey's dissolution in 1539. Inside the church are fine 14th century wall paintings depicting St Catherine and St Christopher, on the north wall, and St Margaret and coursing scenes, on the south. The church is a Grade I listed building. The church is part of the Winchcombe benefice and occasional services are held.

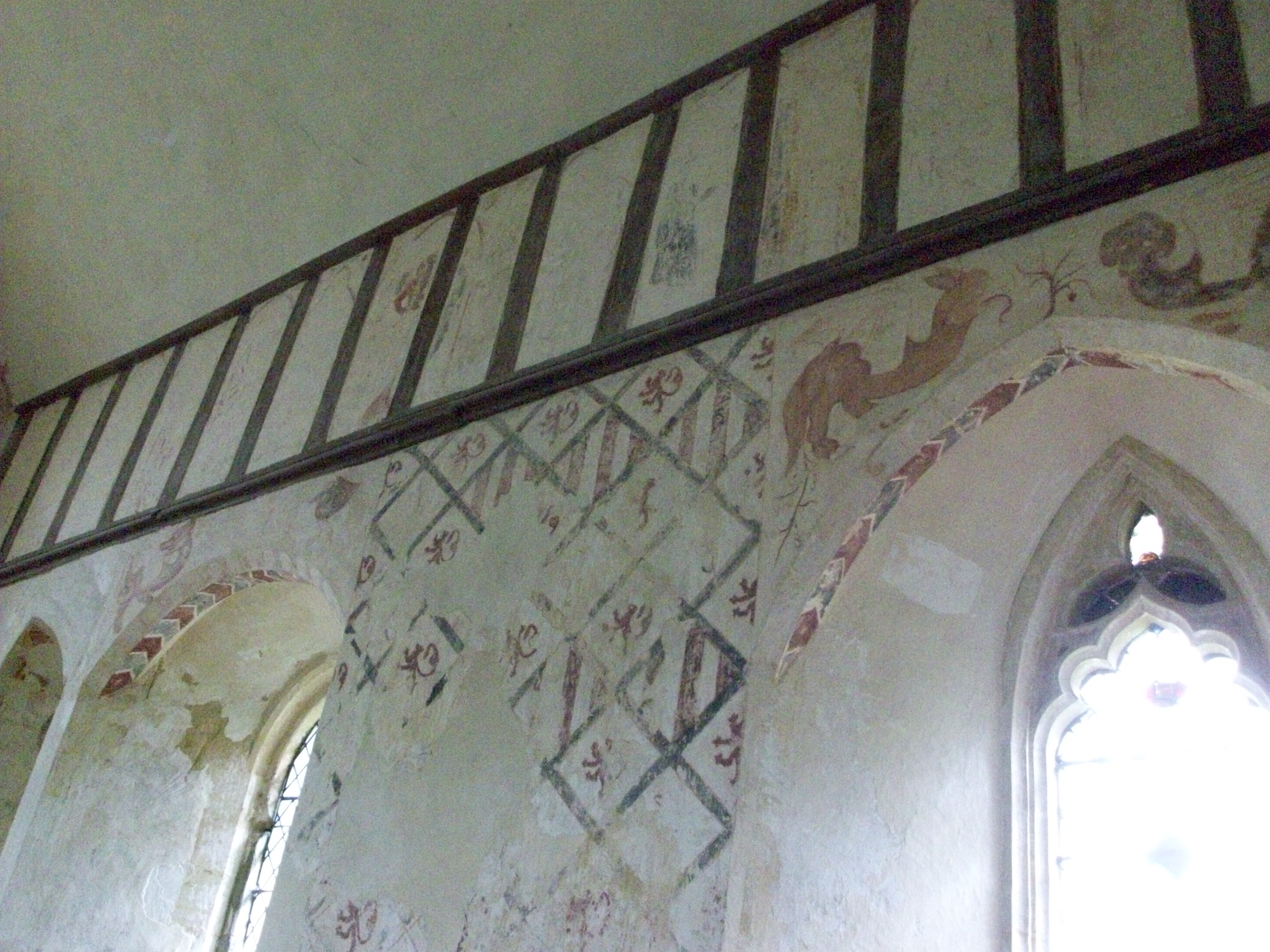
Hailes Church's medieval paintings
