= Nesta Pain =

English broadcaster and writer

Florence Nesta Kathleen Pain (1905–1995, known as Nesta Pain, née Taylor) was an English broadcaster and writer.

== Early life and education ==
Nesta Taylor was born on 27 July 1905 in Toxteth Park, Liverpool. Her family had been prominent locally: her grandfather Francis Taylor, 1st Baron Maenan had been a judge and her uncle William Taylor was archdeacon of Liverpool. She attended West Heath Girls' School in Kent, and then gained a first-class degree in classics at the University of Liverpool, followed by doctoral studies in comparative philology at Somerville College, Oxford. She married Coard Henry Pain, then aged 39, on 25 March 1926, and they had one daughter. In 1942 Nesta left her husband and moved to London with her daughter, then aged 15.

== BBC career ==
Pain joined the BBC on 9 February 1942 and worked for it until she retired in 1970.

She wrote, produced and directed many programmes for BBC Radio, both the then Home Service and the Third Programme, and was a key member of the Features Department. She persuaded John Mortimer to write a radio play The Dock Brief in 1957, which became the 1962 film of the same name. Her television work, from 1956 onwards, included documentaries on Queen Victoria, Byron and Nelson.

She published books on topics including slimming, Louis Pasteur, insects, the Empress Matilda and George III, and at the time of her death was working on The Price of Freedom, "seeking to explain why England had never suffered from tyranny".

She has been described as "cultural translator", "an individual who expresses the essence of entanglement in their career choices, moving between genres, media, or nations".

Paine's obituary in The Independent described her as "a woman of the Nineties in the Fifties", and the Oxford Dictionary of National Biography describes how: "In her final years, when confined to bed after a fall, she kept her mind active by learning English and Latin poetry and reading the newspapers every morning". She died of pneumonia in hospital in London on 23 July 1995, 4 days before her 90th birthday.

== Selected publications ==
- Pain, Nesta (1951). Science and Slimming. Secker & Warburg.
- Pain, Nesta (1953). Lesser Worlds. Illustrated by J. Yunge-Bateman. Longmans.
- Pain, Nesta (1957). Louis Pasteur. A&C Black.
- Pain, Nesta (1957). Grassblade Jungle. MacGibbon & Kee.
- Pain, Nesta (1964). The King and Becket. Eyre and Spottiswoode.
- Pain, Nesta (1975). George III at Home. Eyre Methuen. ISBN 0413265900.
- Pain, Nesta (1978). Empress Matilda : uncrowned queen of England. Weidenfeld & Nicolson. ISBN 9780297773597.
