= Hailes Castle, Gloucestershire =

Castle in Gloucestershire, United Kingdom

Coordinates: 51°58′11″N 1°55′35″W

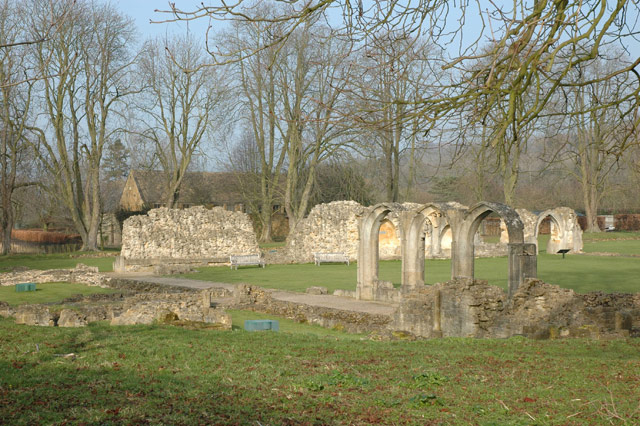
The ruins of Hailes Abbey now occupy the former castle site

Hailes Castle was a castle in the village of Hailes in Gloucestershire, England.

The castle was built around the 11th or early 12th century near the church in the village. The castle was moated, although this has since been filled in. The castle was strengthened by Ralph of Worcester at the start of the difficult years of the Anarchy, with Hailes Castle playing a role in the conflict between 1139 and 1145. The castle was probably demolished in the 1240s to make way for the construction of Hailes Abbey.

== See also ==
- Castles in Great Britain and Ireland
- List of castles in England

== Bibliography ==
- Walker, David. Gloucestershire Castles, in Transactions of the Bristol and Gloucestershire Archaeological Society, 1991, Vol. 109.
