= Empress Matilda =

Holy Roman Empress from 1114 to 1125; claimant to the English throne

Matilda
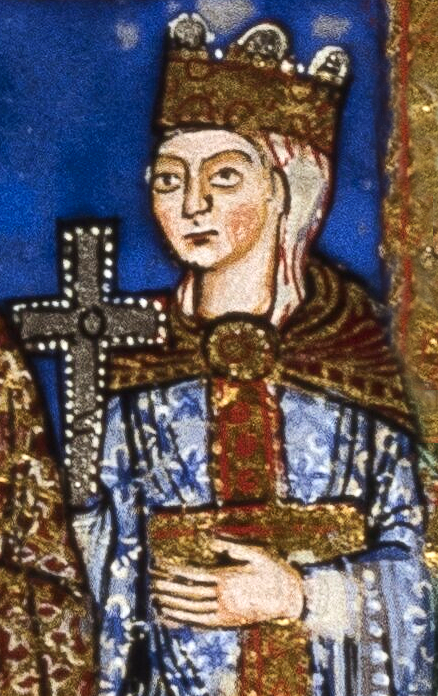
- Depiction of Matilda in the 12th-century Gospels of Henry the Lion

Holy Roman Empress; Queen consort of the Romans
- Tenure: 7 January 1114 – 23 May 1125
- Coronation: 25 July 1110

Lady of the English
- Reign: 8 April 1141 – 1148
- Predecessor: Stephen (as king)
- Successor: Stephen (as king)
- Contender: Stephen
- Born: c. 7 February 1102; Possibly Winchester or Sutton Courtenay, England
- Died: 10 September 1167 (aged 65); Rouen, Normandy, France
- Burial: Bec Abbey, France (1167–1846); Rouen Cathedral, France (since 1846)
- Spouses: Henry V, Holy Roman Emperor (m. 1114; died 1125) Geoffrey V, Count of Anjou (m. 1128; died 1151)
- Issue: Henry II, King of England; Geoffrey, Count of Nantes; William, Viscount of Dieppe
- House: Normandy
- Father: Henry I of England
- Mother: Matilda of Scotland

Empress Matilda (c. 7 February 1102 – 10 September 1167), also known as Empress Maud (Note: Maud is a vernacular form of Matilda derived from the Anglo-Norman Mehaut, and was used to differentiate her from other Matildas in historical literature.) or Athelicia, was Holy Roman Empress as the consort of Emperor Henry V from 1110 until 1125, and was subsequently a claimant to the English throne during the civil war known as the Anarchy (1138–1153). Following the death of her father, King Henry I of England, as his only surviving legitimate child and nominated heir, she asserted her right to the English throne. However, her cousin Stephen of Blois usurped the crown.

Matilda was the eldest child and only surviving daughter of Henry I of England and his first wife, Matilda of Scotland. As a child, she went to Germany where she was married to the future Henry V. She travelled with the emperor to Italy in 1116, was controversially crowned empress in St Peter's Basilica, and acted as the imperial regent in Italy. Matilda and Henry V had no children, and when he died in 1125, his rival Lothair of Supplinburg claimed the imperial crown.

Matilda's brother, William Adelin, died in the White Ship disaster of 1120, leaving Matilda's father and realm facing a potential succession crisis. Upon her widowhood in the Holy Roman Empire, Henry I recalled Matilda to his Duchy of Normandy and arranged for her to marry Geoffrey of Anjou to form an alliance to protect his southern borders in France. Henry had no further legitimate children and nominated Matilda as his heir, making his court swear an oath of loyalty to her and her successors, but the decision was not popular in his Anglo-Norman court. Henry died in 1135, but Matilda and Geoffrey faced opposition from the barons. Henry's nephew and successor, King Stephen, enjoyed the backing of the English Church. Stephen took steps to solidify his new regime but faced threats both from neighbouring powers and from opponents within his kingdom.

In 1139, Matilda crossed to England to take the kingdom by force, supported by her half-brother Robert, Earl of Gloucester, and her uncle David I of Scotland, while her husband, Geoffrey, focused on conquering Normandy. Matilda's forces captured Stephen at the Battle of Lincoln in 1141, but her attempt to be crowned at Westminster Abbey collapsed in the face of bitter opposition from the London crowds. As a result of this retreat, Matilda was never formally declared Queen of England, and was instead titled "Lady of the English" (Latin: domina Anglorum). Robert was captured following the Rout of Winchester in 1141, and Matilda agreed to exchange Stephen for him. Matilda was besieged at Oxford Castle by Stephen's forces that winter, but escaped at night across the frozen River Isis (Thames) to Abingdon. The war degenerated into a stalemate, with Matilda controlling much of the south-west of England, and Stephen the south-east and the Midlands. Large parts of the rest of the country were in the hands of local, independent barons.

Matilda returned to Normandy, now in the hands of her husband, in 1148, leaving their eldest son, Henry, to continue the campaign in England; he was eventually declared Stephen's heir after the signing of the Treaty of Wallingford and succeeded to the throne in 1154, forming the Angevin Empire. Matilda settled her court near Rouen and for the rest of her life concerned herself with the administration of Normandy, acting on her son's behalf when necessary. Particularly in the early years of her son's reign, she provided political advice and attempted to mediate during the Becket controversy. She worked extensively with the Church, founding Cistercian monasteries, and was known for her piety. She was buried under the high altar at Bec Abbey after her death in 1167, until much later when her tomb was moved to Rouen Cathedral.

== Early life ==
Matilda was born to Henry I, King of England and Duke of Normandy, and his first wife, Matilda of Scotland, possibly on 7 February 1102 at Sutton Courtenay, in Berkshire. (Note: Matilda's date of birth was not recorded at the time and can only be estimated by later chroniclers' statements about her age. Older histories suggested that Matilda of Scotland gave birth to a child in the city of Winchester in July 1101. These were based on the writings of the chronicler Wace; current scholarship, based on the records of the Queen's travels, considers this account to have been impossible, and places Matilda of Scotland at Sutton Courtenay in early February 1102, where the Empress Matilda was probably born.) Henry was the youngest son of William the Conqueror, who had invaded England in 1066, creating an empire stretching into Wales. The invasion had created an Anglo-Norman elite, many with estates spread across both sides of the English Channel. These barons typically had close links to the Kingdom of France, which was then a loose collection of counties and smaller polities, under only the minimal control of the French king. Her mother Matilda was the daughter of Malcolm III of Scotland and Margaret of Wessex, a member of the West Saxon royal family, and a descendant of Edward the Exile and Alfred the Great. For Henry I, marrying Matilda of Scotland had given his reign increased legitimacy, and for her it had been an opportunity for high status and power in England.

Matilda had a younger, legitimate brother, William Adelin, and her father's relationships with numerous mistresses resulted in around 22 illegitimate siblings. (Note: Historians have debated whether William Adelin was Matilda's younger brother or her twin. The historian Marjorie Chibnall has argued against the theory of the siblings being twins, citing various reasons, including William of Malmesbury stating they were born on different dates, and the timing of congratulatory messages from the pope. Matilda's father, Henry, had a considerable sexual appetite and enjoyed a substantial number of sexual partners, resulting in a large number of illegitimate children, at least nine sons and 13 daughters, many of whom he appears to have recognised and supported.) Little is known about Matilda's earliest life, but she probably stayed with her mother, was taught to read, and was educated in religious morals. (Note: The broadcaster and author Nesta Pain argues, however, that Matilda was educated by the nuns of Wilton Abbey.) Among the nobles at the English court were her uncle David, later the king of Scotland, and aspiring nobles such as her illegitimate half-brother Robert of Gloucester, her cousin Stephen of Blois and Brian Fitz Count. In 1108, Henry left Matilda and William Adelin in the care of Anselm, the archbishop of Canterbury, while he travelled to Normandy; Anselm was a favoured cleric of Matilda's mother. There is no detailed description of Matilda's appearance; contemporaries described Matilda as being very beautiful, but this may have simply reflected the conventional practice among the chroniclers.

== Holy Roman Empire ==
=== Marriage and coronation ===
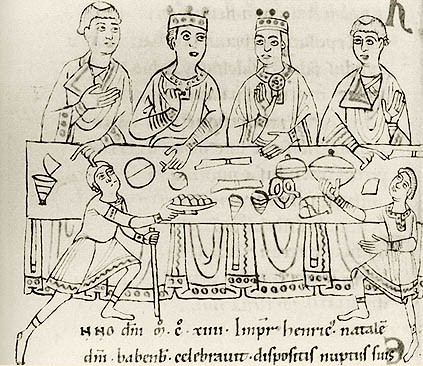
12th-century depiction of Matilda and Henry's wedding feast

In late 1108 or early 1109, Henry V of Germany sent envoys to Normandy proposing that Matilda marry him, and wrote separately to her mother on the same matter. The match was attractive to the English king: his daughter would be marrying into one of the most prestigious dynasties in Europe, reaffirming his own, slightly questionable, status as the youngest son of a new royal house, and gaining him an ally in dealing with France. In return, Henry V would receive a dowry of 10,000 marks, which he needed to fund an expedition to Rome for his coronation as Holy Roman emperor. The final details of the deal were negotiated at Westminster in June 1109 and, as a result of her changing status, Matilda attended a royal council for the first time that October. She left England in February 1110 to make her way to Germany.

The couple met at Liège before travelling to Utrecht where, on 10 April, they became officially betrothed. On 25 July Matilda was crowned German queen in a ceremony at Mainz. There was a considerable age gap between the couple, as Matilda was only eight years old while Henry was 24. After the betrothal she was placed into the custody of Archbishop Bruno of Trier, who was tasked with educating her in German culture, manners and government. (Note: The account of the dismissal of Matilda's retinue comes from the chronicler Orderic Vitalis, but other evidence suggests that at least some of her companions stayed with her.) In January 1114 Matilda was ready to be married to Henry, and their wedding was held at the city of Worms amid extravagant celebrations. Matilda now entered public life in Germany, complete with her own household.

Political conflict broke out across the empire shortly after the marriage, triggered when Henry arrested his chancellor, Archbishop Adalbert of Mainz, and various other German princes. Rebellions followed, accompanied by opposition from within the Church, which played an important part in administering the Empire, and this led to Henry's formal excommunication by Pope Paschal II. Henry and Matilda marched over the Alps into Italy in early 1116, intent on settling matters permanently with the Pope. Matilda was now playing a full part in the imperial government, sponsoring royal grants, dealing with petitioners and taking part in ceremonial occasions. The rest of the year was spent establishing control of northern Italy, and in early 1117 the couple advanced on Rome itself.

Paschal fled when Henry and Matilda arrived with their army, and in his absence the papal envoy Maurice Bourdin crowned the couple at St Peter's Basilica, probably that Easter and certainly (again) at Pentecost. Matilda used these ceremonies to claim the title of empress of the Holy Roman Empire. The Empire was governed by monarchs who, like Henry V, had been elected by the major nobles to become the king. These kings typically hoped to be subsequently crowned by the pope as emperors, but this could not be guaranteed. Henry V had coerced Paschal II into crowning him in 1111, but Matilda's own status was less clear. As a result of her marriage to the King of the Romans she was clearly the legitimate Queen of the Romans, a title that she used thereafter on her seal and charters, but it was uncertain if she had a legitimate claim to the title of empress. After his imperial coronation in 1111, Henry continued to call himself king and emperor of the Romans interchangeably.

Both Bourdin's status and the ceremonies themselves were deeply ambiguous. Strictly speaking, the ceremonies were not imperial coronations but instead were formal "crown-wearing" occasions, among the few times in the year when the rulers would wear their crowns in court. Bourdin had also been excommunicated by the time he conducted the second ceremony, and he was later deposed and imprisoned for life by Pope Callixtus II. Nonetheless, Matilda maintained that she had been officially crowned as the empress in Rome. Her use of the title became widely accepted. She consistently used the title empress from 1117 until her death; chanceries and chroniclers alike conceded her the honorific, seemingly without question.

=== Widowhood ===
In 1118, Henry returned north over the Alps into Germany to suppress fresh rebellions, leaving Matilda as his regent to govern Italy. (Note: Matilda's role in government in Germany was not unusual for the period; German emperors and princes frequently delegated administrative and military duties to their wives.) There are few records of her rule over the next two years, but she probably gained considerable practical experience of government. In 1119, she returned north to meet Henry in Lotharingia. Her husband was occupied in finding a compromise with the Pope, who had excommunicated him. In 1122, Henry and probably Matilda were at the Council of Worms. The council settled the long-running dispute with the Church when Henry gave up his rights to invest bishops with their episcopal regalia. Matilda attempted to visit her father in England that year, but the journey was blocked by Count Charles I of Flanders, whose territory she would have needed to pass through. Historian Marjorie Chibnall argues Matilda had intended to discuss the inheritance of the English crown on this journey.

The couple remained childless, but neither party was considered to be infertile and contemporary chroniclers blamed their situation on the Emperor and his sins against the Church. (Note: The chronicler Hermann of Tournai gives an account that Matilda gave birth to a child who died, but this is uncorroborated. The writer seems to wish to convey an unfavorable assessment of the character of Matilda's mother, who had allegedly once been a nun, thereby cursing her marriage.) In early 1122, they travelled down the Rhine together as Henry continued to suppress the ongoing political unrest, but by now he was suffering from cancer. He died on 23 May 1125 in Utrecht, leaving Matilda in the protection of their nephew Frederick II of Swabia, the heir to his estates, and in possession of the imperial insignia. It is unclear what instructions he gave her about the future of the Empire, which faced another leadership election. Archbishop Adalbert subsequently convinced Matilda that she should give him the insignia, and led the electoral process which appointed Lothair of Supplinburg, a former enemy of Henry, as the new king.

Now aged 23, Matilda had only limited options as to how she might spend the rest of her life. Being childless, she could not exercise a role as an imperial regent, which left her with the choice of either becoming a nun or remarrying. Some offers of marriage started to arrive from German princes, but she chose to return to Normandy. She does not appear to have expected to return to Germany, as she gave up her estates within the Empire and departed with her personal collection of jewels, her own imperial regalia, two of Henry's crowns, and the valuable relic of the Hand of St James the Apostle.

== Succession crisis ==
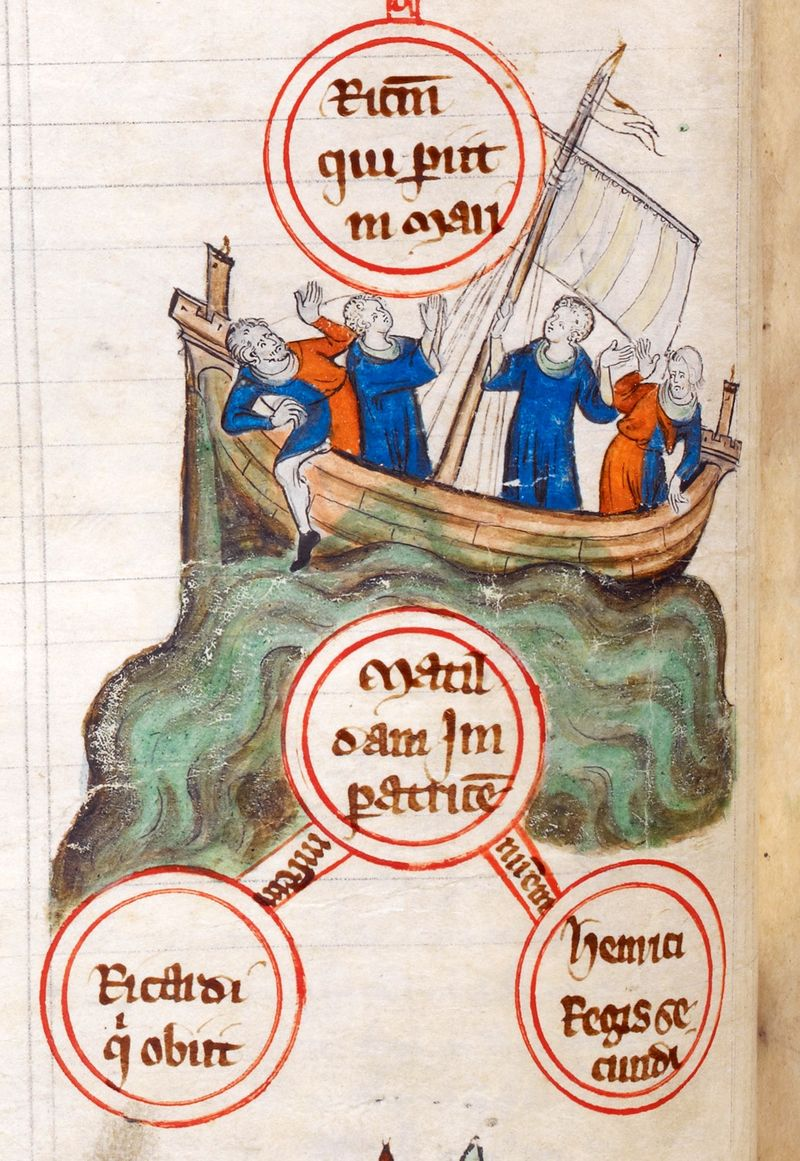
A 14th-century depiction of the White Ship sinking of 1120

In 1120, the English political landscape had changed dramatically after the White Ship disaster. Around three hundred passengers – including Matilda's brother William Adelin and many other senior nobles – embarked one night on the White Ship to travel from Barfleur in Normandy across to England. The vessel foundered just outside the harbour, possibly as a result of overcrowding or excessive drinking by the ship's master and crew, and all but two of the passengers died. William Adelin was among the casualties.

With William dead, the succession to the English throne was thrown into doubt. Rules of succession were uncertain in western Europe at the time; in some parts of France, male primogeniture was becoming more popular, in which the eldest son would inherit a title. It was also traditional for the king of France to crown his successor while he was still alive, making the intended line of succession relatively clear. This was not the case in England, where the best a noble could do was to identify what Professor Eleanor Searle has termed "a pool of legitimate heirs", leaving them to challenge and dispute the inheritance after his death. The problem was further complicated by the sequence of unstable Anglo-Norman successions over the previous sixty years. William the Conqueror had invaded England, his sons William Rufus and Robert Curthose had fought a war between them to establish their inheritance, and Henry I had only acquired control of Normandy by force. There had been no peaceful, uncontested successions.

Initially, Henry put his hopes in fathering another son. William and Matilda's mother, Matilda of Scotland, had died in 1118, and so Henry took a new wife, Adeliza of Louvain. Henry and Adeliza did not conceive any children, and the future of the dynasty appeared at risk. Henry may have begun to look among his nephews for a possible heir. He may have considered his sister Adela's son Stephen of Blois as a possible option and, perhaps in preparation for this, he arranged a beneficial marriage for Stephen to Matilda's wealthy maternal cousin, Matilda I, Countess of Boulogne. Theobald IV, Count of Blois, another nephew and close ally, possibly also felt that he was in favour with Henry. William Clito, the only son of Robert Curthose, was King Louis VI of France's preferred choice, but William was in open rebellion against Henry and was therefore unsuitable. Henry might have also considered his own illegitimate son, Robert of Gloucester, as a possible candidate, but English tradition and custom would have looked unfavourably on this. Henry's plans shifted when Empress Matilda's husband, Emperor Henry, died in 1125.

== Return to Normandy ==
=== Marriage to Geoffrey of Anjou ===
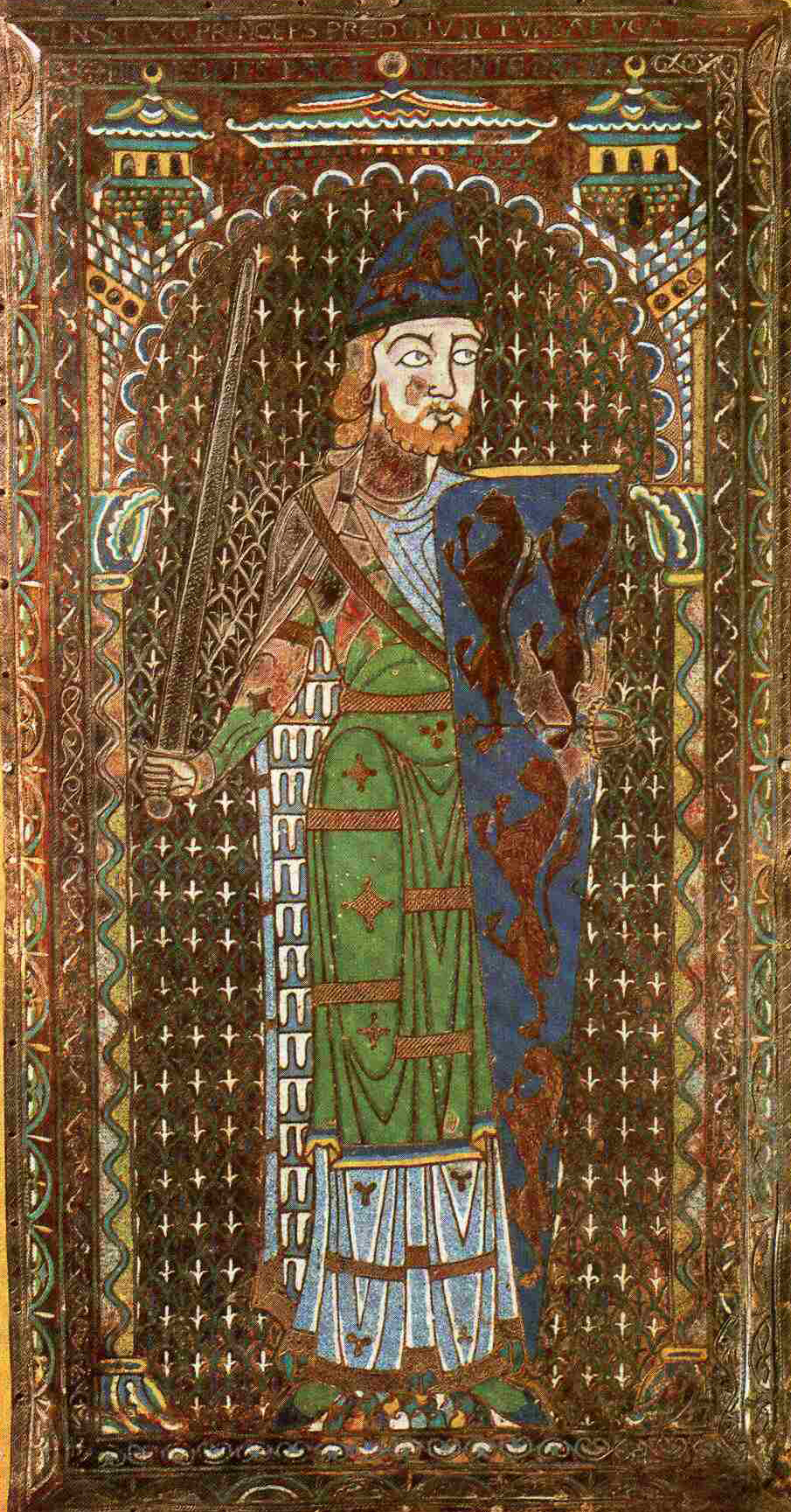
Contemporary depiction of Geoffrey of Anjou, Matilda's second husband

Matilda returned to Normandy in 1125 and spent about a year at the royal court, where her father was still hoping that his second marriage would generate a son. If this failed to happen, Matilda was Henry's preferred choice, and he declared that she was to be his rightful successor if he should not have another legitimate son. The Anglo-Norman barons were gathered together at Westminster on Christmas 1126, where they swore in January to recognise Matilda and any future legitimate heir she might have. (Note: Medieval chroniclers' accounts of this oath vary on the points of detail. William of Malmesbury stated that the nobles present recognised Matilda as the legitimate heir on the basis of her paternal and maternal royal descent; John of Worcester described the inheritance of England as being conditional on Matilda having a legitimate male heir; the Anglo-Saxon chronicle suggested that an oath was given concerning the inheritance of both England and Normandy; neither Orderic or Henry of Huntingdon recorded the event at all. Some chronicler accounts may have been influenced by Stephen's acquisition of the throne in 1135 and the later events of the Anarchy.)

Henry began to formally look for a new husband for Matilda in early 1127 and received various offers from princes within the Empire. His preference was to use Matilda's marriage to secure the southern borders of Normandy by marrying her to Geoffrey, the eldest son of Count Fulk V of Anjou. Henry's control of Normandy had faced numerous challenges since he had conquered it in 1106, and the latest threat came from his nephew William Clito, the new count of Flanders, who enjoyed the support of the French king. It was essential to Henry that he not face a threat from the south as well as the east of Normandy. William Adelin had married Fulk's daughter Matilda, which would have cemented an alliance between Henry and Anjou, but the White Ship disaster put an end to this. Henry and Fulk argued over the fate of the marriage dowry, and this had encouraged Fulk to turn to support William Clito instead. Henry's solution was now to negotiate the marriage of Matilda to Geoffrey, recreating the former alliance.

Matilda appears to have been unimpressed by the prospect of marrying Geoffrey of Anjou. She felt that marrying the son of a count diminished her imperial status, and she was probably also unhappy about marrying someone so much younger than she was; Matilda was 25 and Geoffrey was 13. Hildebert, the Archbishop of Tours, eventually intervened to persuade her to go along with the engagement. Matilda finally agreed, and she travelled to Rouen in May 1127 with Robert of Gloucester and Brian Fitz Count where she was formally betrothed to Geoffrey. Over the course of the next year, Fulk decided to depart for Jerusalem, where he hoped to become king, leaving his possessions to Geoffrey. Henry knighted his future son-in-law, and Matilda and Geoffrey were married a week later on 17 June 1128 in Le Mans by the bishops of Le Mans and Séez. Fulk finally left Anjou for Jerusalem in 1129, declaring Geoffrey the count of Anjou and Maine.

=== Disputes ===
The marriage proved difficult, as the couple did not particularly like each other. There was a further dispute over Matilda's dowry; she was granted various castles in Normandy by Henry, but it was not specified when the couple would actually take possession of them. It is also unknown whether Henry intended Geoffrey to have any future claim on England or Normandy, and he was probably keeping Geoffrey's status deliberately uncertain. Soon after the marriage, Matilda left Geoffrey and returned to Normandy. Henry appears to have blamed Geoffrey for the separation, but the couple were finally reconciled in 1131. Henry summoned Matilda from Normandy, and she arrived in England that August. It was decided that Matilda would return to Geoffrey at a meeting of the King's great council in September. The council also gave another collective oath of allegiance to recognise her as Henry's heir. (Note: The cause behind the soured relations is not fully known, though historian Marjorie Chibnall stated, "historians have tended to put the blame on Matilda ... This is a hasty judgement based on two or three hostile English chroniclers; such evidence as there is suggests Geoffrey was at least as much to blame".)

Matilda gave birth to her first son in March 1133 at Le Mans, the future Henry II. Henry I was delighted by the news and came to see her at Rouen. At Pentecost 1134, her second son, Geoffrey, was born in Rouen, but the childbirth was extremely difficult and Matilda appeared close to death. She made arrangements for her will and argued with her father about where she should be buried. Matilda preferred Bec Abbey, but Henry wanted her to be interred at Rouen Cathedral. Matilda recovered, and Henry was overjoyed by the birth of his second grandson, possibly insisting on another round of oaths from his nobility. (Note: Historians Jim Bradbury and Frank Barlow suggest that an oath was taken in 1131; Marjorie Chibnall is more doubtful that this occurred.)

From then on, relations became increasingly strained between Matilda and Henry. Matilda and Geoffrey suspected that they lacked genuine support in England for their claim to the throne, and proposed in 1135 that the King should hand over the royal castles in Normandy to Matilda and should insist that the Norman nobility immediately swear allegiance to her. This would have given the couple a much more powerful position after Henry's death, but the King angrily refused, probably out of a concern that Geoffrey would try to seize power in Normandy while he was still alive. A fresh rebellion broke out in southern Normandy, and Geoffrey and Matilda intervened militarily on behalf of the rebels.

In the middle of this confrontation, Henry unexpectedly fell ill and died near Lyons-la-Forêt. It is uncertain what, if anything, Henry said about the succession before his death. Contemporary chronicler accounts were coloured by subsequent events. Sources favourable to Matilda suggested that Henry had reaffirmed his intent to grant all his lands to his daughter, while hostile chroniclers argued that Henry had renounced his former plans and had apologised for having forced the barons to swear an oath of allegiance to her.

=== Road to war ===
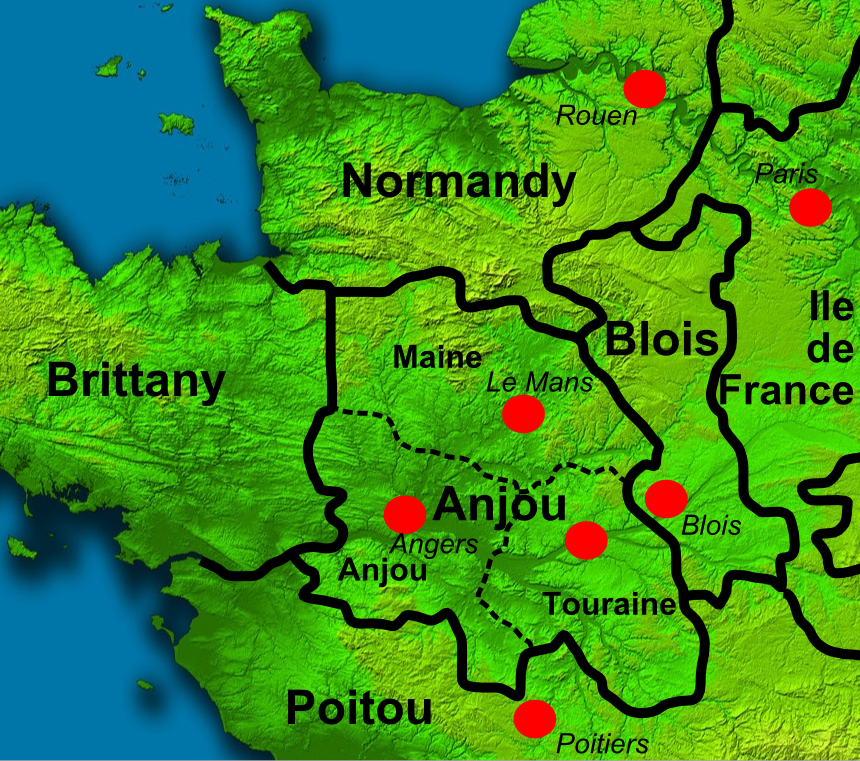
Northern France around the time of Henry's death; red circles mark major urban centres

When news began to spread of Henry I's death, Matilda and Geoffrey were in Anjou, supporting the rebels in their campaign against the royal army, which included a number of Matilda's supporters such as Robert of Gloucester. Many of these barons had taken an oath to stay in Normandy until the late king was properly buried, which prevented them from returning to England. Nonetheless, the couple took the opportunity to march into southern Normandy and seize a number of key castles around Argentan that had formed Matilda's disputed dowry. They then stopped, unable to advance further, pillaging the countryside and facing increased resistance from the Norman nobility and a rebellion in Anjou itself. Matilda was by now also pregnant with her third son, William; opinions vary among historians as to how much this affected her military plans. (Note: Opinions vary among historians as to the role of Matilda's third pregnancy in her decision not to advance further in 1135. Helen Castor, for example, argues that this was a major factor in Matilda's thinking, particularly given the complications in Matilda's earlier pregnancies; Marjorie Chibnall rejects this argument, putting the emphasis on the political and military problems that the Empress faced that year.)

Meanwhile, news of Henry's death had reached Stephen of Blois, conveniently placed in Boulogne, and he left for England, accompanied by his military household. Robert of Gloucester had garrisoned the ports of Dover and Canterbury and some accounts suggest that they refused Stephen access when he first arrived. Nonetheless Stephen reached the edge of London by 8 December and over the next week he began to seize power in England. The crowds in London proclaimed Stephen the new monarch, believing that he would grant the city new rights and privileges in return, and his brother Henry, Bishop of Winchester, delivered the support of the Church to Stephen. Stephen had sworn to support Matilda in 1127, but Henry convincingly argued that the late king had been wrong to insist that his court take the oath, and suggested that the King had changed his mind on his deathbed. (Note: Henry of Winchester was able to persuade Hugh Bigod, the late king's royal steward, to swear that the King had changed his mind about the succession on his deathbed, nominating Stephen instead. Modern historians, such as Edmund King, doubt that Hugh Bigod's account of Henry I's final hours was truthful.) Stephen's coronation was held at Westminster Abbey on 22 December.

Following the news that Stephen was gathering support in England, the Norman nobility had gathered at Le Neubourg to discuss declaring his elder brother Theobald king. The Normans argued that the count, as the eldest grandson of William the Conqueror, had the most valid claim over the kingdom and the Duchy, and was certainly preferable to Matilda. Their discussions were interrupted by the sudden news from England that Stephen's coronation was to occur the next day. Theobald's support immediately ebbed away, as the barons were not prepared to support the division of England and Normandy by opposing Stephen. (Note: The events in Normandy are less well recorded than elsewhere, and the exact sequence of events less certain. Historian Robert Helmerichs, for example, describes some of the inconsistencies in these accounts. Some historians, including David Crouch and Helmerichs, argue that Theobald and Stephen had probably already made a private deal to seize the throne when Henry died.)

Matilda gave birth to her third son William on 22 July 1136 at Argentan, and she then operated out of the border region for the next three years, establishing her household knights on estates around the area. Matilda may have asked Ulger, the bishop of Angers, to garner support for her claim with Pope Innocent II in Rome, but if she did, Ulger was unsuccessful. Geoffrey invaded Normandy in early 1136 and, after a temporary truce, invaded again later the same year, raiding and burning estates rather than trying to hold the territory. Stephen returned to the Duchy in 1137, where he met with Louis VI and Theobald to agree to an informal alliance against Geoffrey and Matilda, to counter the growing Angevin power in the region. Stephen formed an army to retake Matilda's Argentan castles, but frictions between his Flemish mercenary forces and the local Norman barons resulted in a battle between the two halves of his army. The Norman forces then deserted the King, forcing Stephen to give up his campaign. Stephen agreed to another truce with Geoffrey, promising to pay him 2,000 marks a year in exchange for peace along the Norman borders.

In England, Stephen's reign started off well, with lavish gatherings of the royal court that saw him give out grants of land and favours to his supporters. Stephen received the support of Pope Innocent II, thanks in part to the testimony of Louis and Theobald. Troubles rapidly began to emerge. Matilda's uncle David I of Scotland invaded the north of England on the news of Henry's death, taking Carlisle, Newcastle and other key strongholds. Stephen rapidly marched north with an army and met David at Durham, where a temporary compromise was agreed. South Wales rose in rebellion, and by 1137 Stephen was forced to abandon attempts to suppress the revolt. Stephen put down two revolts in the south-west led by Baldwin de Redvers and Robert of Bampton; Baldwin was released after his capture and travelled to Normandy, where he became a vocal critic of the King.

=== Revolt ===
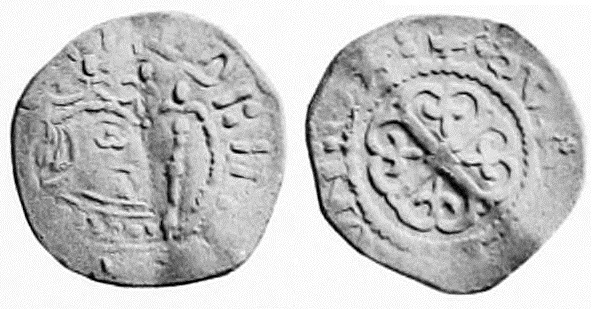
A Matilda silver penny, minted in Oxford

Matilda's half-brother, Robert of Gloucester, was one of the most powerful Anglo-Norman barons, controlling estates in Normandy as well as the Earldom of Gloucester. In 1138, he rebelled against Stephen, starting the descent into civil war in England. Robert renounced his fealty to the King and declared his support for Matilda, which triggered a major regional rebellion in Kent and across the south-west of England, although he himself remained in Normandy. Matilda had not been particularly active in asserting her claims to the throne since 1135 and in many ways it was Robert who took the initiative in declaring war in 1138. In France, Geoffrey took advantage of the situation by invading Normandy. David of Scotland also invaded the north of England once again, announcing that he was supporting the claim of Matilda to the throne, pushing south into Yorkshire. (Note: David I was the uncle of both Empress Matilda and Matilda of Boulogne.)

Stephen responded quickly to the revolts and invasions, paying most of his attention to England rather than Normandy. His wife Matilda was sent to Kent with ships and resources from Boulogne, with the task of retaking the key port of Dover, under Robert's control. A small number of Stephen's household knights were sent north to help the fight against the Scots, where David's forces were defeated later that year at the Battle of the Standard. Despite this victory, however, David still occupied most of the north. Stephen himself went west in an attempt to regain control of Gloucestershire, first striking north into the Welsh Marches, taking Hereford and Shrewsbury, before heading south to Bath. The town of Bristol itself proved too strong for him, and Stephen contented himself with raiding and pillaging the surrounding area. The rebels appear to have expected Robert to intervene with support, but he remained in Normandy throughout the year, trying to persuade the Empress Matilda to invade England herself. Dover finally surrendered to the Queen's forces later in the year.

By 1139, an invasion of England by Robert and Matilda appeared imminent. Geoffrey and Matilda had secured much of Normandy and, together with Robert, spent the beginning of the year mobilising forces for a cross-Channel expedition. Matilda also appealed to the papacy at the start of the year; her representative, Bishop Ulger, put forward her legal claim to the English throne on the grounds of her hereditary right and the oaths sworn by the barons. Arnulf of Lisieux led Stephen's case, arguing that because Matilda's mother had really been a nun, her claim to the throne was illegitimate. The Pope declined to reverse his earlier support for Stephen, but from Matilda's perspective the case usefully established that Stephen's claim was disputed.

== Civil war ==
=== Initial moves ===
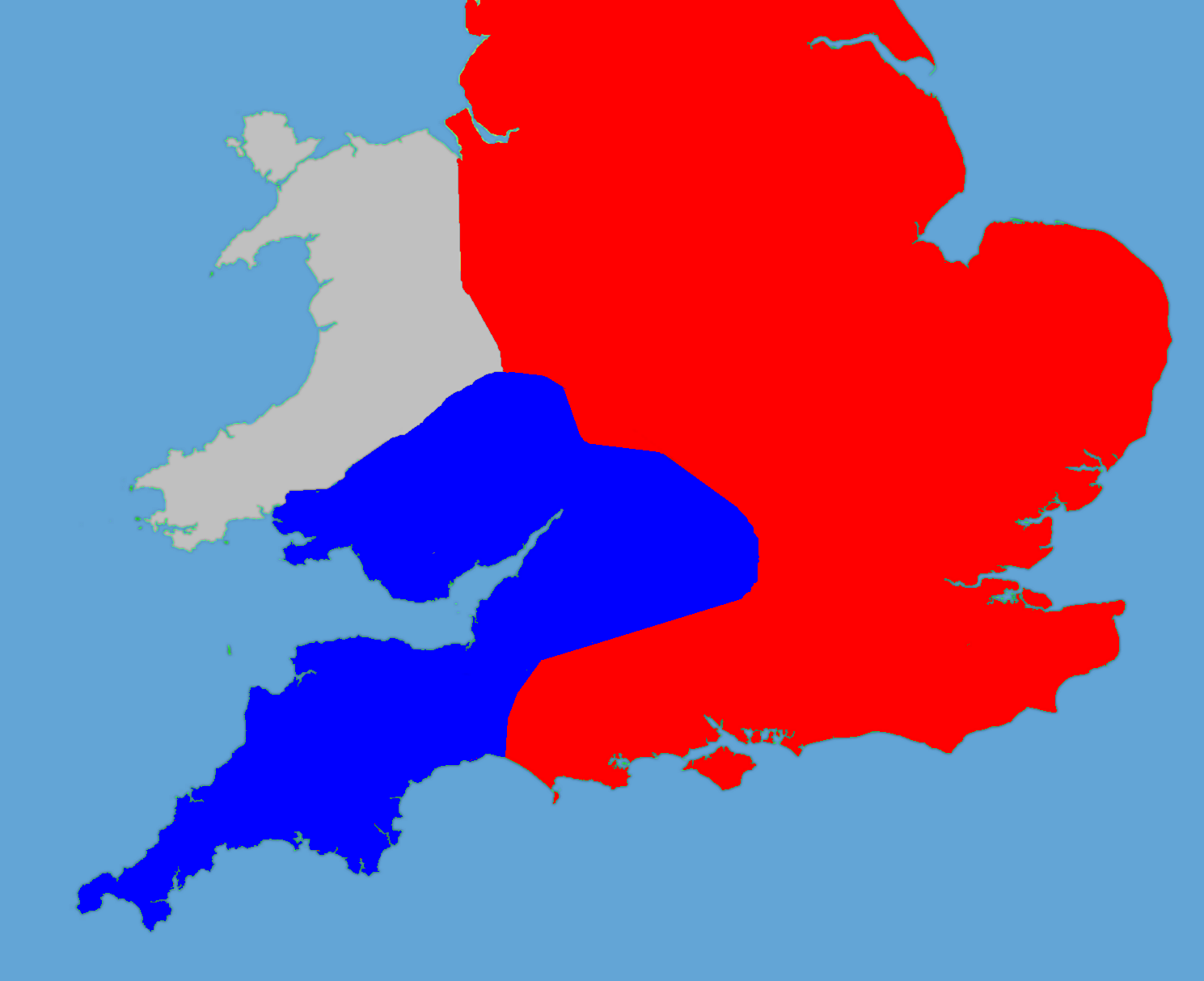
Political map of Wales and southern England in 1140; areas under Matilda's control (blue); Stephen's (red); Welsh (grey)

Empress Matilda's invasion finally began at the end of the summer of 1139. Baldwin de Redvers crossed over from Normandy to Wareham in August in an initial attempt to capture a port to receive Matilda's invading army, but Stephen's forces forced him to retreat into the south-west. The following month, the Empress was invited by her stepmother, Queen Adeliza, to land at Arundel instead, and on 30 September Robert and Matilda arrived in England with a force of 140 knights. (Note: Edmund King disagrees that the Empress received an invitation to Arundel, arguing that she appeared unexpectedly.) Matilda stayed at Arundel Castle, while Robert marched north-west to Wallingford and Bristol, hoping to raise support for the rebellion and to link up with Miles of Gloucester, who took the opportunity to renounce his fealty to the King and declare for Matilda.

Stephen responded by promptly moving south, besieging Arundel and trapping Matilda inside the castle. Stephen then agreed to a truce proposed by his brother Henry; the full details of the agreement are not known, but the results were that Matilda and her household of knights were released from the siege and escorted to the south-west of England, where they were reunited with Robert of Gloucester. The reasons for Matilda's release remain unclear. Stephen may have thought it was in his own best interests to release the Empress and concentrate instead on attacking Robert, seeing Robert, rather than Matilda, as his main opponent at this point in the conflict. Arundel Castle was also considered almost impregnable, and Stephen may have been worried that he risked tying down his army in the south whilst Robert roamed freely in the west. Another theory is that Stephen released Matilda out of a sense of chivalry; Stephen had a generous, courteous personality and women were not normally expected to be targeted in Anglo-Norman warfare. (Note: "Chivalry" was firmly established as a principle in Anglo-Norman warfare by the time of Stephen; it was not considered appropriate or normal to execute elite prisoners and, as historian John Gillingham observes, neither Stephen nor Matilda did so except where the opponent had already breached the norms of military conduct.)

After staying for a period in Robert's stronghold of Bristol, Matilda established her court in nearby Gloucester, still safely in the south-west but far enough away for her to remain independent of her half-brother. Although there had been only a few new defections to her cause, Matilda still controlled a compact block of territory stretching out from Gloucester and Bristol south into Wiltshire, west into the Welsh Marches and east through the Thames Valley as far as Oxford and Wallingford, threatening London. Her influence extended down into Devon and Cornwall, and north through Herefordshire, but her authority in these areas remained limited.

Matilda faced a counterattack from Stephen, who started by attacking Wallingford Castle which controlled the Thames corridor; it was held by Brian Fitz Count and Stephen found it too well defended. Stephen continued into Wiltshire to attack Trowbridge, taking the castles of South Cerney and Malmesbury en route. In response, Miles marched east, attacking Stephen's rearguard forces at Wallingford and threatening an advance on London. Stephen was forced to give up his western campaign, returning east to stabilise the situation and protect his capital.

At the start of 1140, Bishop Nigel of Ely joined Matilda's faction. Hoping to seize East Anglia, he established his base of operations in the Isle of Ely, then surrounded by protective fenland. Nigel faced a rapid response from Stephen, who made a surprise attack on the isle, forcing Nigel to flee to Gloucester. Robert's men retook some of the territory that Stephen had taken in his 1139 campaign. In an effort to negotiate a truce, Bishop Henry held a peace conference at Bath, at which Matilda was represented by Robert. The conference collapsed after Henry and the clergy insisted that they should set the terms of any peace deal, which Stephen's representatives found unacceptable.

=== Battle of Lincoln ===
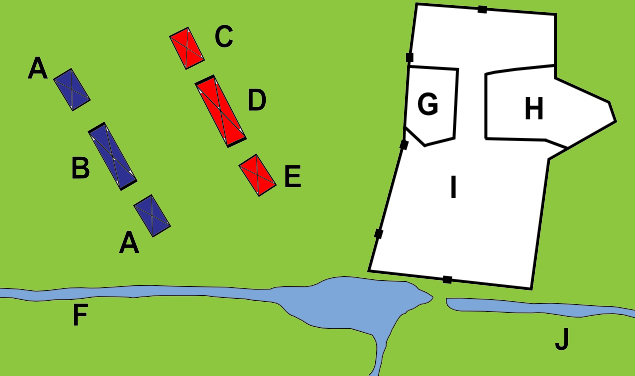
The Battle of Lincoln, 1141: A: Welsh forces; B: Robert; C: Alan; D: Stephen; E: William; F: Fosse Dyke; G: Lincoln Castle; H: Lincoln Cathedral; I: City of Lincoln; J: River Witham

Matilda's fortunes changed dramatically for the better at the start of 1141. Ranulf of Chester, a powerful northern magnate, had fallen out with the King over the winter and Stephen had placed his castle in Lincoln under siege. In response, Robert and Ranulf advanced on Stephen's position with a larger force, resulting in the Battle of Lincoln on 2 February 1141. The King commanded the centre of his army, with Alan of Brittany on his right and William of Aumale on his left. Robert and Ranulf's forces had a superiority in cavalry and Stephen dismounted many of his own knights to form a solid infantry block. (Note: David Crouch argues that in fact it was the royalist weakness in infantry that caused their failure at Lincoln, proposing the city militia was not as capable as Robert's Welsh infantry.) After an initial success in which William's forces destroyed the Angevins' Welsh infantry, the battle went well for Matilda's forces. Robert and Ranulf's cavalry encircled Stephen's centre, and the King found himself surrounded by the Angevin army. After much fighting, Robert's soldiers finally overwhelmed Stephen and he was taken away from the field in custody.

Matilda received Stephen in person at her court in Gloucester, before having him moved to Bristol Castle, traditionally used for holding high-status prisoners. Matilda now began to take the necessary steps to have herself crowned queen in his place, which would require the agreement of the Church and her coronation at Westminster. Henry of Winchester summoned a council at Winchester before Easter in his capacity as papal legate to consider the clergy's view. Matilda had made a private deal with Henry that he would deliver the support of the Church in exchange for being granted control over Church affairs. Henry handed over the royal treasury to her, which proved to be rather depleted except for Stephen's crown, and he excommunicated many of her enemies who refused to switch sides. Archbishop Theobald of Canterbury was unwilling to declare Matilda queen so rapidly, however, and a delegation of clergy and nobles, headed by Theobald, travelled to Bristol to see Stephen, who agreed that, given the situation, he was prepared to release his subjects from their oath of fealty to him.

The clergy gathered again in Winchester after Easter, on 7 April 1141, and the following day they declared that Matilda should be monarch in place of Stephen. She assumed the title "Lady of England and Normandy" (Latin: domina Anglorum, lit. 'Lady of the English') as a precursor to her coronation. Although Matilda's own followers attended the event, few other major nobles seem to have attended and the delegation from London procrastinated. Stephen's wife, Queen Matilda, wrote to complain and demand her husband's release. Nonetheless, Matilda then advanced to London to arrange her coronation in June, where her position became precarious. Despite securing the support of Geoffrey, Earl of Essex, who controlled the Tower of London, forces loyal to King Stephen and Queen Matilda remained close to the city and the citizens were fearful about welcoming the Empress. On 24 June, shortly before the planned coronation, the city rose up against the Empress and Geoffrey of Essex; Matilda and her followers fled just in time, making a chaotic retreat back to Oxford.

Meanwhile, Geoffrey of Anjou invaded Normandy again and, in the absence of Waleran of Beaumont, who was still fighting in England, Geoffrey took all the Duchy south of the River Seine and east of the Risle. No help was forthcoming from Stephen's brother Theobald this time either, who appears to have been preoccupied with his own problems with France—the new French king, Louis VII, had rejected his father's regional alliance, improving relations with Anjou and taking a more bellicose line with Theobald, which would result in war the following year. Geoffrey's success in Normandy and Stephen's weakness in England began to influence the loyalty of many Anglo-Norman barons, who feared losing their lands in England to Robert and the Empress, and their possessions in Normandy to Geoffrey. Many started to leave Stephen's faction. His friend and advisor Waleran was one of those who decided to defect in mid-1141, crossing into Normandy to secure his ancestral possessions by allying himself with the Angevins, and bringing Worcestershire into the Empress's camp. Waleran's twin brother, Robert, effectively withdrew from fighting in the conflict at the same time. Other supporters of the Empress were restored in their former strongholds, such as Nigel of Ely, and still others received new earldoms in the west of England. The royal control over the minting of coins broke down, leading to coins being struck by local barons and bishops across the country.

=== Rout of Winchester and the Siege of Oxford ===
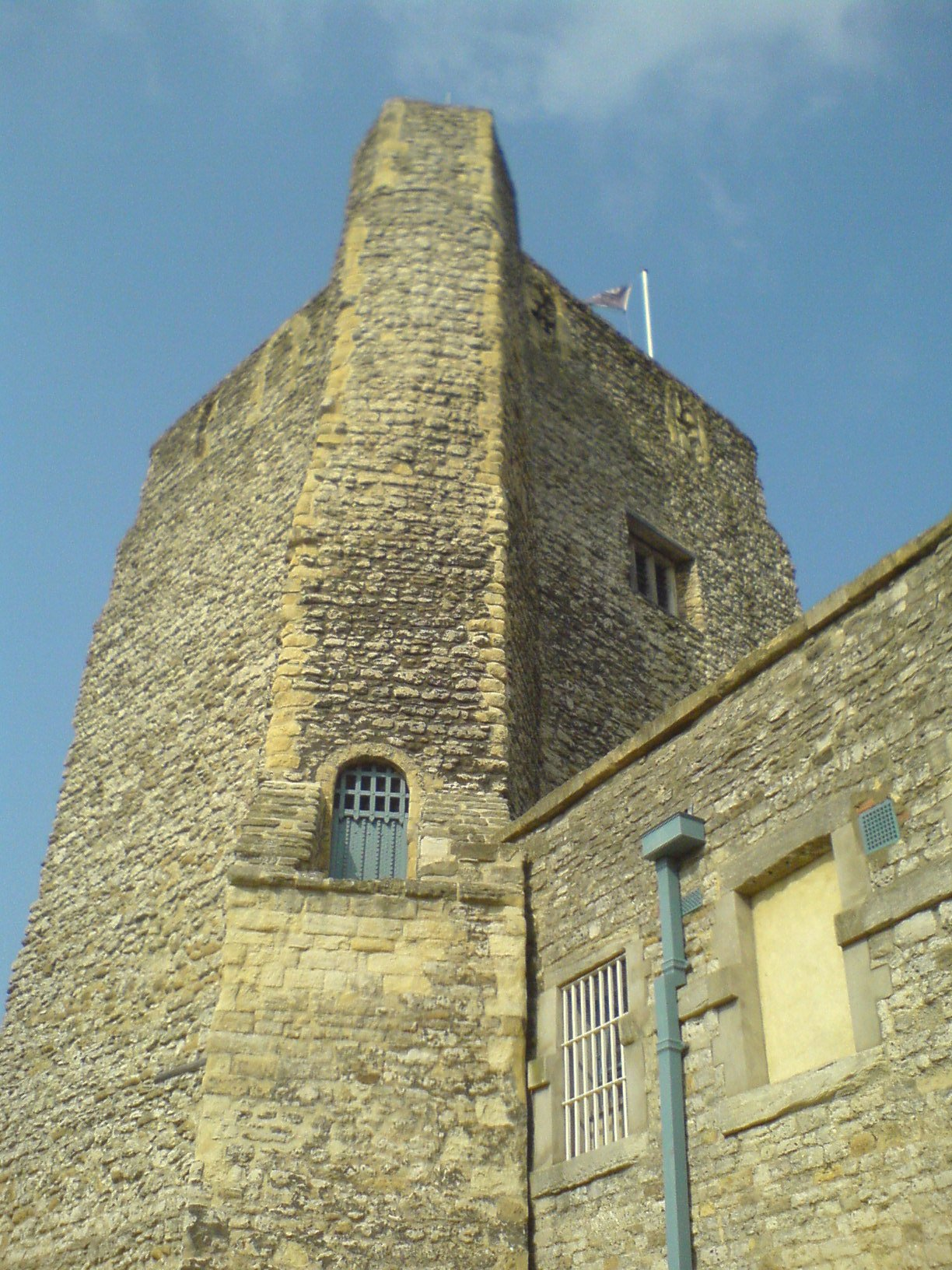
St George's Tower at Oxford Castle

Matilda's position was transformed by her defeat at the Rout of Winchester. Her alliance with Henry of Winchester proved short-lived and they soon fell out over political patronage and ecclesiastical policy; Henry transferred his support back to Stephen's cause. In response, in July the Empress and Robert of Gloucester besieged Henry in his episcopal castle at Winchester, using the royal castle in the city as the base for their operations. Queen Matilda had kept her husband's cause alive in the south-east of England, and the Queen, backed by her lieutenant William of Ypres and reinforced with fresh troops from London, took the opportunity to advance on Winchester. Their forces encircled Matilda's army. Matilda decided to escape from the city with Brian Fitz Count and Reginald, Earl of Cornwall, another of her half-brothers, while the rest of her army delayed the royal forces. In the subsequent battle the Empress's forces were defeated and Robert himself was taken prisoner during the retreat, although Matilda escaped, exhausted, to her fortress at Devizes.

With both Stephen and Robert held prisoner, negotiations were held to try to come to agreement on a long-term peace settlement, but Queen Matilda was unwilling to offer any compromise to the Empress, and Robert refused to accept any offer to encourage him to change sides to Stephen. Instead, in November the two sides simply exchanged the two leaders, Stephen returning to his queen, and Robert to the Empress in Oxford. Henry held another church council, which reversed its previous decision and reaffirmed Stephen's legitimacy to rule, and the King and Queen were crowned anew at Christmas 1141. Stephen travelled north to raise new forces and to successfully persuade Ranulf of Chester to change sides once again. Stephen then spent the summer attacking some of the new Angevin castles built the previous year, including Cirencester, Bampton and Wareham.

During the summer of 1142 Robert returned to Normandy to assist Geoffrey with operations against some of Stephen's remaining followers there, before returning in the autumn. Matilda came under increased pressure from Stephen's forces and was surrounded at Oxford. Oxford was a secure town, protected by walls and the River Isis, but Stephen led a sudden attack across the river, leading the charge and swimming part of the way. Once on the other side, the King and his men stormed into the town, trapping Matilda in the castle. Oxford Castle was a powerful fortress and, rather than storming it, Stephen decided to settle down for a long siege. Just before Christmas, Matilda sneaked out of the castle with a handful of knights (probably via a postern gate), crossed the icy river and made her escape past the royal army on foot to Abingdon-on-Thames and then riding to safety at Wallingford, leaving the castle garrison to surrender the next day. (Note: Most chroniclers suggest Matilda probably escaped from Oxford Castle via a postern gate, although one suggests she climbed down the walls using a rope.) Matilda and her companions reportedly wore white to camouflage themselves against the snow.

=== Stalemate ===
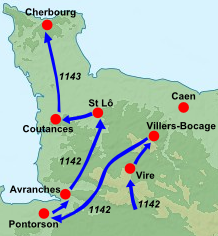
Geoffrey of Anjou's invasion of Normandy, 1142–43

In the aftermath of the retreat from Winchester, Matilda rebuilt her court at Devizes Castle in Wiltshire, a former property of the Bishop of Salisbury that had been confiscated by Stephen. She established her household knights on the surrounding estates, supported by Flemish mercenaries, ruling through the network of local sheriffs and other officials. Many of those that had lost lands in the regions held by the King travelled west to take up patronage from Matilda. Backed by the pragmatic Robert of Gloucester, Matilda was content to engage in a drawn-out struggle, and the war soon entered a stalemate.

At first, the balance of power appeared to move slightly in Matilda's favour. Robert besieged Stephen in 1143 at Wilton Castle, an assembly point for royal forces in Herefordshire. Stephen attempted to break out and escape, resulting in the Battle of Wilton. Once again, the Angevin cavalry proved too strong, and for a moment it appeared that Stephen might be captured for a second time, before finally managing to escape. Later in the year, Geoffrey of Essex rose up in rebellion against Stephen in East Anglia. Geoffrey based himself from the Isle of Ely and began a military campaign against Cambridge, with the intention of progressing south towards London. Ranulf of Chester revolted once again in the summer of 1144. Meanwhile, Geoffrey of Anjou finished securing his hold on southern Normandy, and in January 1144 he advanced into Rouen, the capital of the Duchy, concluding his campaign. Louis VII recognised him as Duke of Normandy shortly after.

Despite these successes, Matilda was unable to consolidate her position. Miles of Gloucester, one of the most talented of her military commanders, had died while hunting over the previous Christmas. Geoffrey of Essex's rebellion against Stephen in the east ended with his death in September 1144 during an attack on Burwell Castle in Cambridgeshire. As a result, Stephen made progress against Matilda's forces in the west in 1145, recapturing Faringdon Castle in Oxfordshire. Matilda authorised Reginald of Cornwall to attempt fresh peace negotiations, but neither side was prepared to compromise.

=== Conclusion of the war ===
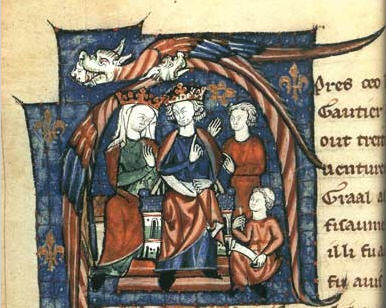
12th-century depiction of Matilda's eldest son Henry II and his wife Eleanor holding court

The character of the conflict in England gradually began to shift; by the late 1140s, the major fighting in the war was over, giving way to an intractable stalemate, with only the occasional outbreak of fresh fighting. Several of Matilda's key supporters died: in 1147 Robert of Gloucester died peacefully, and Brian Fitz Count gradually withdrew from public life, probably eventually joining a monastery; by 1151 he was dead. Many of Matilda's other followers joined the Second Crusade when it was announced in 1145, leaving the region for several years. Some of the Anglo-Norman barons made individual peace agreements with each other to secure their lands and war gains, and many were not keen to pursue any further conflict.

Matilda's eldest son Henry slowly began to assume a leading role in the conflict. He had remained in France when his mother first left for England. He crossed over to England in 1142, before returning to Anjou in 1144. Geoffrey of Anjou expected Henry to become the King of England and began to involve him in the government of the family lands. In 1147, Henry intervened in England with a small mercenary army but the expedition failed, not least because Henry lacked the funds to pay his men. Henry asked his mother for money, but she refused, stating that she had none available. In the end Stephen himself ended up paying off Henry's mercenaries, allowing him to return home safely; his reasons for doing so remain unclear. (Note: One potential explanation is Stephen's general courtesy to a member of his extended family; another is that he was starting to consider how to end the war peacefully, and saw this as a way of building a relationship with Henry.)

Matilda decided to return to Normandy in 1148, partially due to her difficulties with the Church. She had occupied the strategically essential Devizes Castle in 1142, maintaining her court there, but legally it still belonged to Josceline de Bohon, Bishop of Salisbury, and in late 1146 Pope Eugene III intervened to support his claims, threatening Matilda with excommunication if she did not return it. Matilda first played for time, then left for Normandy in early 1148, leaving the castle to Henry, who then procrastinated over its return for many years. Matilda re-established her court in Rouen, where she met with her sons and husband and probably made arrangements for her future life in Normandy, and for Henry's next expedition to England. Matilda chose to live in the priory of Notre Dame du Pré, situated just south of Rouen, where she lived in personal quarters attached to the priory and in a nearby palace built by Henry.

Matilda increasingly devoted her efforts to the administration of Normandy, rather than to the war in England. Geoffrey sent the bishop of Thérouanne to Rome in 1148 to campaign for Henry's right to the English throne, and opinion within the English Church gradually shifted in Henry's favour. Matilda and Geoffrey made peace with Louis VII, who in return supported Henry's rights to Normandy. Geoffrey died unexpectedly in 1151, and Henry claimed the family lands. Henry returned to England once again at the start of 1153 with a small army, winning the support of some of the major regional barons. Neither side's army was keen to fight, however, and the Church brokered a truce; a permanent peace followed, under which Henry recognised Stephen as king, but became Stephen's adopted son and successor. Meanwhile, Normandy faced considerable disorder and the threat of baronial revolt, which Matilda was unable to totally suppress. Stephen died the next year, and Henry assumed the throne; his coronation used the grander of the two imperial crowns that Matilda had brought back from Germany in 1125. Once Henry had been crowned, the troubles facing Matilda in Normandy died away.

== Later life ==
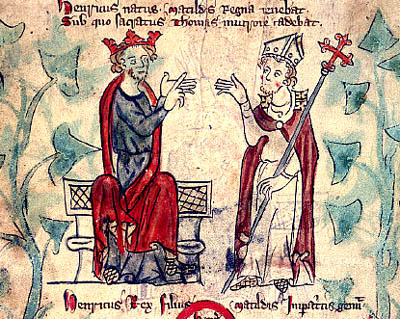
Early 14th-century representation of Henry II and Thomas Becket, arguing

Matilda spent the rest of her life in Normandy, often acting as Henry's representative and presiding over the government of the Duchy. Early on, Matilda and her son issued charters in England and Normandy in their joint names, dealing with the various land claims that had arisen during the wars. Particularly in the initial years of his reign, the King drew on her for advice on policy matters. Matilda was involved in attempts to mediate between Henry and his Chancellor Thomas Becket when the two men fell out in the 1160s. Matilda had originally cautioned against the appointment, but when the Prior of Mont St Jacques asked her for a private interview on Becket's behalf to seek her views, she provided a moderate perspective on the problem. Matilda explained that she disagreed with Henry's attempts to codify English customs, which Becket opposed as well, but also condemned poor administration in the English Church and Becket's own headstrong behaviour.

Matilda helped to deal with several diplomatic crises. The first of these involved the Hand of St James, the relic which Matilda had brought back with her from Germany many years before. Holy Roman Emperor Frederick I considered the hand to be part of the imperial regalia and requested that Henry return it to Germany. Matilda and Henry were equally insistent that it should remain at Reading Abbey, where it had become a popular attraction for visiting pilgrims. Frederick was bought off with an alternative set of expensive gifts from England, including a huge, luxurious tent, probably chosen by Matilda, which Frederick used for court events in Italy. She was also approached by Louis VII of France in 1164, and helped to defuse a growing diplomatic row over the handling of Crusading funds.

In her old age Matilda paid increasing attention to Church affairs and her personal faith, although she remained involved in governing Normandy throughout her life. Matilda appears to have had particular fondness for her youngest son William. She opposed Henry's proposal in 1155 to invade Ireland and give the lands to William, however, possibly on the grounds that the project was impractical, and instead William received large grants of land in England. Matilda was more easy-going in her later life than in her youth, but the chronicler of Mont St Jacques, who met her during this period, still felt that she appeared to be "of the stock of tyrants".

== Death ==
Matilda died on 10 September 1167 in Rouen, and her remaining wealth was given to the Church. (Note: The chronicler Geoffrey of Vigeois stated that Matilda had become a nun at the time of her death, but he appears to have confused the Empress with Matilda of Anjou.) She was buried under the high altar at the abbey of Bec-Hellouin in a service led by Rotrou, the archbishop of Rouen. Her tomb's epitaph included the lines "Great by birth, greater by marriage, greatest in her offspring: here lies Matilda, the daughter, wife, and mother of Henry", which became a famous phrase among her contemporaries. (Note: The original Latin of the phrase runs Ortu magna, viro major, sed maxima partu, hic jacet Henrici filia, sponsa, parens.) This tomb was damaged in a fire in 1263 and later restored in 1282, before finally being destroyed by an English army in 1421. In 1684 the Congregation of St Maur identified some of her remaining bones and reburied them at Bec-Hellouin in a new coffin. Her remains were lost again after the destruction of Bec-Hellouin's church by Napoleon, but were found once more in 1846 and this time reburied at Rouen Cathedral, where they remain.

== Matilda as ruler ==
=== Government, law and court ===
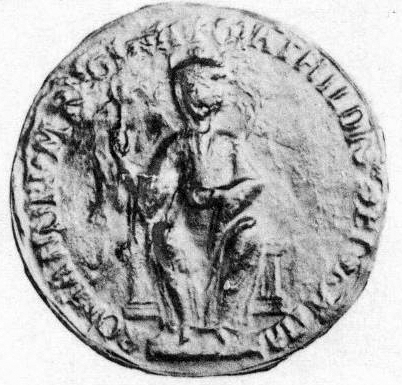
Matilda's great seal, the image possibly an accurate likeness of her

In the Holy Roman Empire, the young Matilda's court included knights, chaplains and ladies-in-waiting, although, unlike some queens of the period, she did not have her own personal chancellor to run her household, instead using the imperial chancellor. When acting as regent in Italy, she found the local rulers were prepared to accept a female ruler. Her Italian administration included the Italian chancellor, backed by experienced administrators. She was not called upon to make any major decisions, instead dealing with smaller matters and acting as the symbolic representative of her absent husband, meeting with and helping to negotiate with magnates and clergy.

The Anglo-Saxon queens of England had exercised considerable formal power, but this tradition had diminished under the Normans: at most their queens ruled temporarily as regents on their husbands' behalf when they were away travelling, rather than in their own right. On her return from Germany to Normandy and Anjou, Matilda styled herself as empress and the daughter of King Henry. As an imperatrix, 'empress', her status was elevated in medieval social and political thought above all men in England and France. On arrival in England, her charters' seal displayed the inscription Mathildis dei gratia Romanorum Regina, 'Matilda by the grace of God, Queen of the Romans'. Matilda's enthroned portrait on her circular seal distinguished her from elite English contemporaries, both women – whose seals were usually oval with standing portraits – and men, whose seals were usually equestrian portraits. The seal did not depict her on horseback, however, as a male ruler would have been. During the civil war for England, her status was uncertain; these unique distinctions were intended to overawe her subjects. Matilda also remained Henrici regis filia, 'daughter of King Henry', a status that emphasised her claim to the crown was hereditary and derived from her male kin, being the only legitimate offspring of King Henry and Queen Matilda. It further advertised her mixed Anglo-Saxon and Norman descent and her claim as her royal father's sole heir in a century in which feudal tenancies were increasingly passed on by heredity and primogeniture.

In contrast with her rival Stephen and his wife Matilda of Boulogne — styled respectively rex Anglorum, 'King of the English' and regina Anglorum, 'Queen of the English' — Empress Matilda employed the title domina Anglorum. Several interpretations of the title (Latin: domina, lit. 'mistress'), are possible. Domina, is the feminine equivalent of the title dominus, the meaning of which ranged from head of a household to an imperial title and translated as "master" or "lord". Whereas the Old English: cwen, lit. 'queen' carried the implication of a king's wife only, the Old English: hlaefdige, lit. 'lady' was used of a woman exercising temporal powers in her own right, as had Æthelflæd of Mercia. Notably, Matilda's husband Geoffrey never adopted the equivalent dominus Anglorum. Initially between 1139 and 1141 Matilda referred to herself as acting as a feme sole, "a woman [acting] alone", highlighting her autonomy and independence from her spouse. Additionally, it was also conventional that newly elected kings use dominus until their coronation as rex, 'king', the interval being counted as an interregnum. Since she was never crowned at Westminster, during the rest of the war she appears to have used this title rather than that of the queen of England, although some contemporaries referred to her by the royal title. In spring and summer 1141, as Matilda was de facto queen regnant, some royal charters including titles of lands granted to Glastonbury Abbey and Reading Abbey described her as regina Anglorum, while another mentions coronae meae, 'my crown' and regni mei, 'my kingdom'. While Marjorie Chibnall believed the Glastonbury and Reading Abbeys' instances of regina Anglorum are either errors for domina Anglorum or else inauthentic; David Crouch judged this unlikely to be a scribal error and pointed out that Stephen's supporters had used rex Anglorum before his formal coronation, that she was hailed as regina et domina at Winchester in March 1141, and that she "gloried in being called" the royal title. Nonetheless, the style domina Anglorum, now rendered as "Lady of the English", remained more common in documents. The chronicler William of Malmsebury calls her domina only.

Matilda presented herself as continuing the English tradition of centralised royal government, and attempted to maintain a government in England parallel to Stephen's, including a royal household and a chancellor. Matilda gathered revenues from the royal estates in the counties under her control, particularly in her core territories where the sheriffs were loyal to her cause. She appointed earls to rival those created by Stephen. She was unable to operate a system of royal law courts, however, and her administrative resources were extremely limited, although some of her clerks went on to become bishops in Normandy. Matilda issued two types of coins in her name during her time in England, which were used in the west of England and Wales. The first were initially minted in Oxford during her stay there, and the design was then adopted by her mints at Bristol, Cardiff and Wareham after her victory at the Battle of Lincoln. A second design was minted at Bristol and Cardiff during the 1140s.

On returning to Normandy for the last time in 1148, Matilda ceased to use the title Lady of the English, simply styling herself as empress again; she never adopted the title of Countess of Anjou. Matilda's household became smaller, and often merged with Henry's own court when the two were co-located in Rouen. She continued to play a special role in the government of the area around Argentan, where she held feudal rights from the grants made at the time of her second marriage.

=== Relations with the Church ===
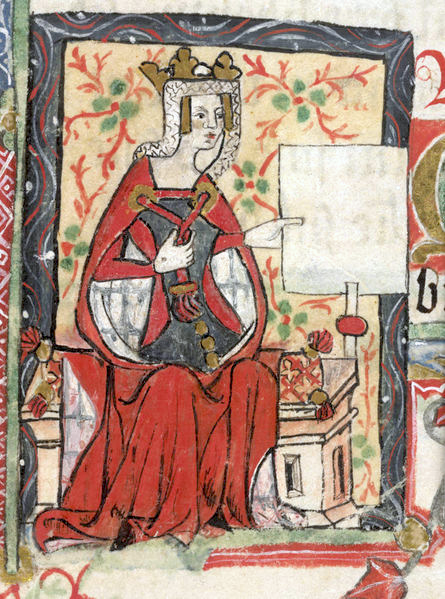
15th century portrait of Matilda in the donor list of the Abbey of St Albans

It is unclear how strong Matilda's personal piety was, although contemporaries praised her lifelong preference to be buried at the monastic site of Bec rather than the grander but more worldly Rouen, and believed her to have substantial, underlying religious beliefs. Like other members of the Anglo-Norman nobility, she bestowed considerable patronage on the Church. Early on in her life, she preferred the well-established Benedictine monastery of Cluny alongside some of the newer Augustinian orders, such as the Victorines and Premonstratensians. As part of this patronage, she re-founded the abbey of Notre-Dame-du-Vœu near Cherbourg.

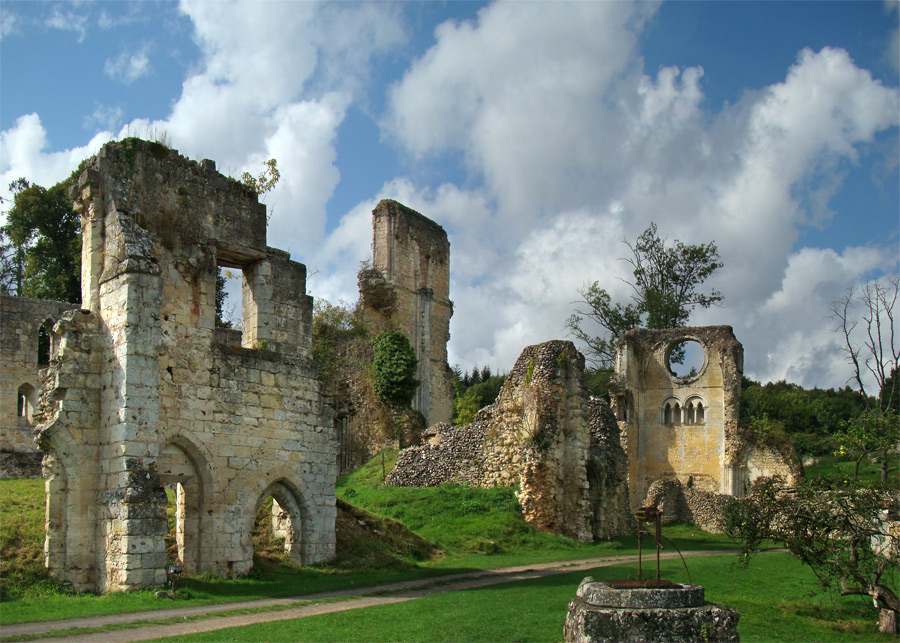
Mortemer Abbey in Normandy, which received financial support from Matilda

As time went by, Matilda directed more of her attention to the Cistercian order. This order was very fashionable in England and Normandy during the period, and was dedicated to the Virgin Mary, a figure of particular importance to Matilda. She had close links to the Cistercian Mortemer Abbey in Normandy, and drew on the house for a supply of monks when she supported the foundation of nearby La Valasse. She encouraged the Cistercians to build at Mortemer on a grand scale, with guest houses to accommodate a range of visitors of all ranks, and may have played a part in selecting the paintings for the monastic chapels.

== Legacy ==
=== Historiography ===
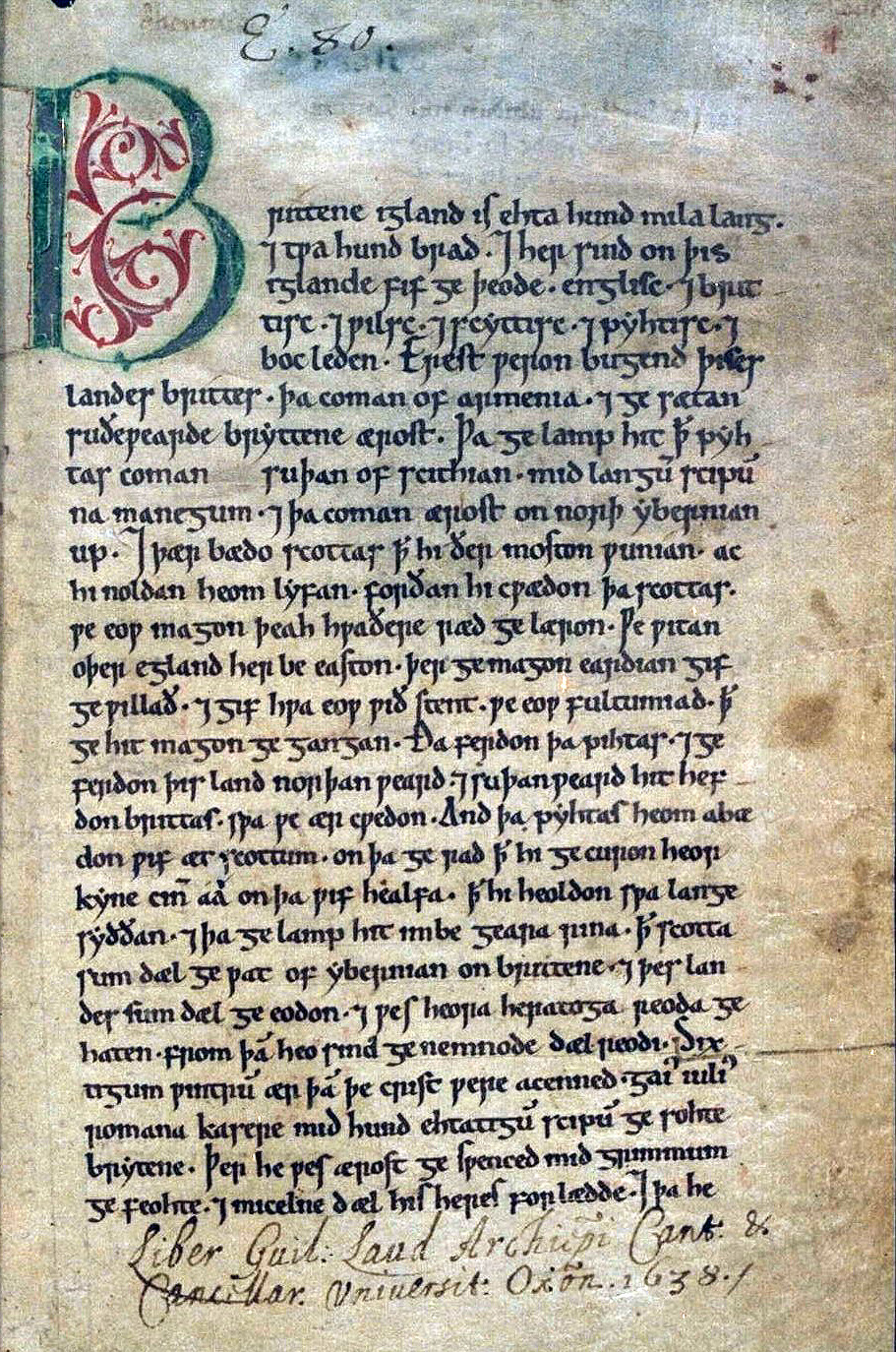
The first page of the Peterborough element of the Anglo-Saxon Chronicle, written around 1150, one of the chronicler accounts that describe Matilda's role during the Anarchy

Contemporary chroniclers in England, France, Germany and Italy documented many aspects of Matilda's life, although the only biography of her, apparently written by Arnulf of Lisieux, has been lost. The chroniclers took a range of perspectives on her. In Germany, the chroniclers praised Matilda extensively and her reputation as the "good Matilda" remained positive. During the years of the Anarchy, works such as the Gesta Stephani took a much more negative tone, praising Stephen and condemning Matilda. Once Henry II assumed the throne, the tone of the chroniclers towards Matilda became more positive. Legends spread in the years after Matilda's death, including the suggestion that her first husband, Henry, had not died but had in fact secretly become a hermit – making Matilda's second marriage illegitimate – and a tale that Matilda had an affair with Stephen, resulting in the conception of Henry II.

Tudor scholars were interested in Matilda's right of succession. According to 16th-century standards, Matilda had a clear right to the English throne, and academics therefore struggled to explain why Matilda had acquiesced to her son Henry's kingship at the end of the war, rather than ruling directly herself. By the 18th century, historians such as David Hume had a much better understanding of the irregular nature of 12th-century law and custom and this question became less relevant. By the 19th century, the archival sources on Matilda's life, including charters, foundation histories, and letters, were being uncovered and analysed. Historians Kate Norgate, Sir James Ramsay and J. H. Round used these to produce new, richer accounts of Matilda and the civil war; Ramsay's account, using the Gesta Stephani, was not complimentary, while Norgate, drawing on French sources, was more neutral in tone. The German academic Oskar Rössler's 1897 biography drew heavily on German charters, not extensively used by Anglophone historians.

Matilda has attracted relatively little attention from modern English academics, being treated as a marginal figure in comparison to other contemporaries, particularly her rival Stephen, in contrast to the work carried out by German scholars on her time in the Empire. Popular, but not always accurate, biographies were written by the Earl of Onslow in 1939 and Nesta Pain in 1978, but the only major academic biography in English remains Marjorie Chibnall's 1991 work. Interpretations of Matilda's character have shifted over time, but there is, as Chibnall describes, a "general agreement that she was either proud or at least keenly conscious of the high status of an empress". Like both Henry I and Henry II, Matilda had a certain autocratic grandeur, which was combined with a firm moral belief in her cause; ultimately however she was limited by the political conventions of the 12th century. The treatment of Matilda by modern historians has been challenged by feminist scholars, including Fiona Tolhurst, who believe some traditional assumptions about her role and personality show gender bias. In this interpretation, Matilda has been unfairly criticised for showing qualities that have been considered praiseworthy when seen in her male contemporaries.

=== Popular culture ===
The civil war years of Matilda's life have been the subject of historical fiction. Matilda, Stephen and their supporters feature in Ellis Peters's historical detective series about Brother Cadfael, set between 1137 and 1145. Peters paints the Empress as proud and aloof, in contrast to Stephen, a tolerant man and a reasonable ruler. Matilda's martial reputation may also have contributed to Alfred, Lord Tennyson's decision to entitle his 1855 battle poem "Maud". Matilda served as the inspiration for A Song of Ice and Fire character of Rhaenyra Targaryen.

== Family tree ==
Matilda's family tree:

Matilda of Flanders	William the Conqueror
Margaret of Wessex	Malcolm III of Scotland
Adela of Normandy	David I of Scotland	Mary of Scotland	Matilda of Scotland	Henry I of England
Theobald II of Champagne	Henry of Blois	Stephen of England	Matilda of Boulogne	Empress Matilda	William Adelin	Robert of Gloucester

== Bibliography ==
- Amt, Emilie (1993), The Accession of Henry II in England: Royal Government Restored, 1149–1159, Woodbridge, UK: Boydell Press, ISBN 978-0-85115-348-3
- Barlow, Frank (1999), The Feudal Kingdom of England, 1042–1216 (5th ed.), Harlow, UK: Pearson Education, ISBN 978-0-582-38117-9
- Beem, Charles (2009), Levin, Carole; Bucholz, R. O. (eds.), Queens and Power in Medieval and Early Modern England, Lincoln, US: University of Nebraska Press, ISBN 978-0-8032-2968-6
- Bennett, Matthew (2000), "The Impact of 'Foreign' Troops in the Civil Wars of Stephen's Reign", in Dunn, Diana E. S. (ed.), War and Society in Medieval and Early Modern Britain, Liverpool, UK: Liverpool University Press, ISBN 978-0-85323-885-0
- Blackburn, Mark (1994), "Coinage and Currency", in King, Edmund (ed.), The Anarchy of King Stephen's Reign, Oxford, UK: Clarendon Press, ISBN 978-0-19-820364-3
- Bradbury, Jim (2009), Stephen and Matilda: the Civil War of 1139–53, Stroud, UK: The History Press, ISBN 978-0-7509-3793-1
- Carpenter, David (2004), The Struggle for Mastery: The Penguin History of Britain 1066–1284, London, UK: Penguin, ISBN 978-0-14-014824-4
- Castor, Helen (2010), She-Wolves: the Women Who Ruled England Before Elizabeth, London, UK: Faber and Faber, ISBN 978-0-571-23706-7
- Chibnall, Marjorie (1991), The Empress Matilda: Queen Consort, Queen Mother and Lady of the English, London, UK: Basil Blackwell, ISBN 978-0-631-15737-3
- Chibnall, Marjorie (1999), "The Empress Matilda and her Sons", in Parsons, John Carmi; Wheeler, Bonnie (eds.), Medieval Mothering, New York, US and London, UK: Garland Publishing, pp. 279–294, ISBN 978-0-8153-3665-5
- Crouch, David (1994), "The March and the Welsh Kings", in King, Edmund (ed.), The Anarchy of King Stephen's Reign, Oxford, UK: Clarendon Press, ISBN 978-0-19-820364-3
- Crouch, David (2002), The Normans: The History of a Dynasty, London, UK: Hambledon Continuum, ISBN 978-1-85285-595-6
- Crouch, David (2008a), The Beaumont Twins: the Roots and Branches of Power in the Twelfth Century, Cambridge, UK: Cambridge University Press, ISBN 978-0-521-09013-1
- Crouch, David (2008b), "King Stephen and Northern France", in Dalton, Paul; White, Graeme J. (eds.), King Stephen's Reign (1135–1154), Woodbridge, UK: Boydell Press, ISBN 978-1-84383-361-1
- Davis, Ralph Henry Carless (1977), King Stephen (1st ed.), London, UK: Longman, ISBN 978-0-582-48727-7
- Gillingham, John (1994), "1066 and the Introduction of Chivalry into England", in Garnett, George; Hudsdon, John (eds.), Law and Government in Medieval England and Normandy: Essays in Honour of Sir James Holt, Cambridge, UK: Cambridge University Press, ISBN 978-0-521-43076-0
- Green, Judith (2009), Henry I: King of England and Duke of Normandy, Cambridge, UK: Cambridge University Press, ISBN 978-0-521-74452-2
- Hallam, Elizabeth M.; Everard, Judith A. (2001), Capetian France, 987–1328 (2nd ed.), Harlow, UK: Longman, ISBN 978-0-582-40428-1
- Hanley, Catherine (2019), Matilda, Yale University Press, ISBN 978-0-300-22725-3
- Helmerichs, Robert (2001), "'Ad tutandos partriae fines': The Defense of Normandy, 1135", in Abels, Richard Philip; Bachrach, Bernard S. (eds.), The Normans and Their Adversaries at War, Woodbridge, UK: Boydell Press, ISBN 978-0-85115-847-1
- Hollister, C. Warren (2003), Frost, Amanda Clark (ed.), Henry I, New Haven, US and London, UK: Yale University Press, ISBN 978-0-300-09829-7
- Huscroft, Richard (2005), Ruling England, 1042–1217, Harlow, UK: Pearson, ISBN 978-0-582-84882-5
- King, Edmund (2010), King Stephen, New Haven, US: Yale University Press, ISBN 978-0-300-11223-8
- Leyser, Karl (1982), Medieval Germany and Its Neighbours, 900–1250, London, UK: Hambledon Press, ISBN 978-0-631-15737-3
- Lovelace, Timothy J. (2003), The Artistry and Tradition of Tennyson's Battle Poetry, London, UK: Routledge, ISBN 978-0-203-49079-2
- Newman, Charlotte A. (1988), The Anglo-Norman Nobility in the Reign of Henry I: the Second Generation, Philadelphia, US: University of Pennsylvania Press, ISBN 978-0-8122-8138-5
- Ortenberg, Veronica (2006), In Search of the Holy Grail: the Quest for the Middle Ages, London, UK: Hambledon Continuum, ISBN 978-1-85285-383-9
- Pain, Nesta (1978), Empress Matilda: Uncrowned Queen of England, London, UK: Butler & Tanner, ISBN 978-0-297-77359-7
- Rielly, Edward J. (2000), "Ellis Peters: Brother Cadfael", in Browne, Ray Broadus; Kreiser, Lawrence A. (eds.), The Detective as Historian: History and Art in Historical Crime, Bowling Green, US: Bowling Green State University Popular Press, ISBN 978-0-87972-815-1
- Songer, Marcia J. (1998), "Stephen or Maud: Brother Cadfael's Discernment", in Kaler, Anne K. (ed.), Cordially Yours, Brother Cadfael, Bowling Green, US: Bowling Green State University Popular Press, pp. 98–108, ISBN 978-0-87972-774-1
- Stringer, Keith J. (1993), The Reign of Stephen: Kingship, Warfare and Government in Twelfth-Century England, London, UK: Routledge, ISBN 978-0-415-01415-1
- Thompson, Kathleen (2003), "Affairs of State: the Illegitimate Children of Henry I", Journal of Medieval History, 29 (2): 129–151, doi:10.1016/S0304-4181(03)00015-0, ISSN 0304-4181, S2CID 144398531
- Tolhurst, Fiona (2013), Geoffrey of Monmouth and the Translation of Female Kingship, New York, US: Palgrave Macmillan, ISBN 978-1-137-27784-8
- Vincent, Nicholas (2006), The Holy Blood: King Henry III and the Westminster Blood Relic, Cambridge, UK: Cambridge University Press, ISBN 978-0-521-02660-4
- White, Graeme J. (2000), Restoration and Reform, 1153–1165: Recovery From Civil War in England, Cambridge, UK: Cambridge University Press, ISBN 978-0-521-55459-6

Empress Matilda House of Normandy Born: February 1102 Died: 10 September 1167
Regnal titles
Preceded by Stephen as King of England	— TITULAR — Lady of the English; 8 April 1141 – 1148	Succeeded by Stephen as King of England
German royalty
Preceded by Constance of Sicily	Queen consort of the Romans; 1110–1125	Succeeded by Richenza of Northeim
Preceded by Eupraxia of Kiev	Empress consort of the Holy Roman Empire; 1110–1125	Succeeded by Richenza of Northeim
