= Hailes Abbey =

Ruined abbey in Hailes, Gloucestershire, England

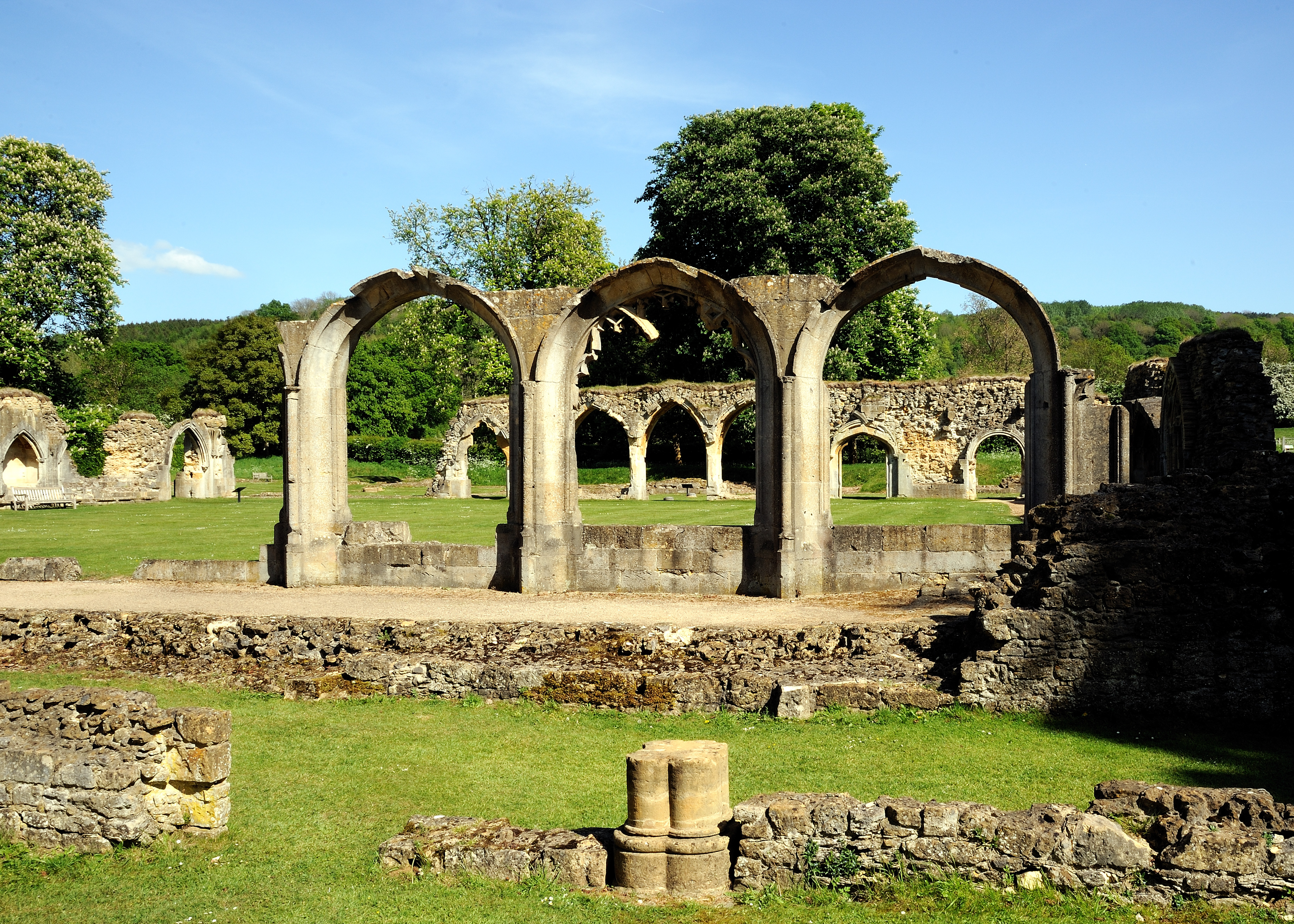
- The ruins of Hailes Abbey (2011)
- Interactive map of Hailes Abbey

Monastery information
- Order: Cistercian
- Established: 1246
- Disestablished: Christmas Eve 1539
- Mother house: Beaulieu Abbey

People
- Founder: Richard, Earl of Cornwall
- Abbot: First: Jordan of Beaulieu; Last: Stephen Sagar

Site
- Location: Parish of Stanway, Gloucestershire, England
- Coordinates: 51°58′6″N 1°55′41″W
- Public access: Yes: the ruins are owned by the National Trust but managed by English Heritage.

Scheduled monument
- Official name: Hailes Abbey and ringwork
- Designated: 1 October 1936
- Reference no.: 1018070

Listed Building – Grade I
- Official name: Hailes Abbey
- Designated: 4 July 1960
- Reference no.: 1154262

Hailes Abbey is a former Cistercian abbey, in the small village of Hailes, two miles northeast of Winchcombe, Gloucestershire, England. It was founded in 1246 as a daughter establishment of Beaulieu Abbey in Hampshire. The abbey was dissolved by Henry VIII in 1539. Little remains of the abbey. It is a Grade I listed building and a scheduled monument.

The site is owned by the National Trust but managed by English Heritage. There is a museum on the site holding many artefacts from the Abbey.

== History ==
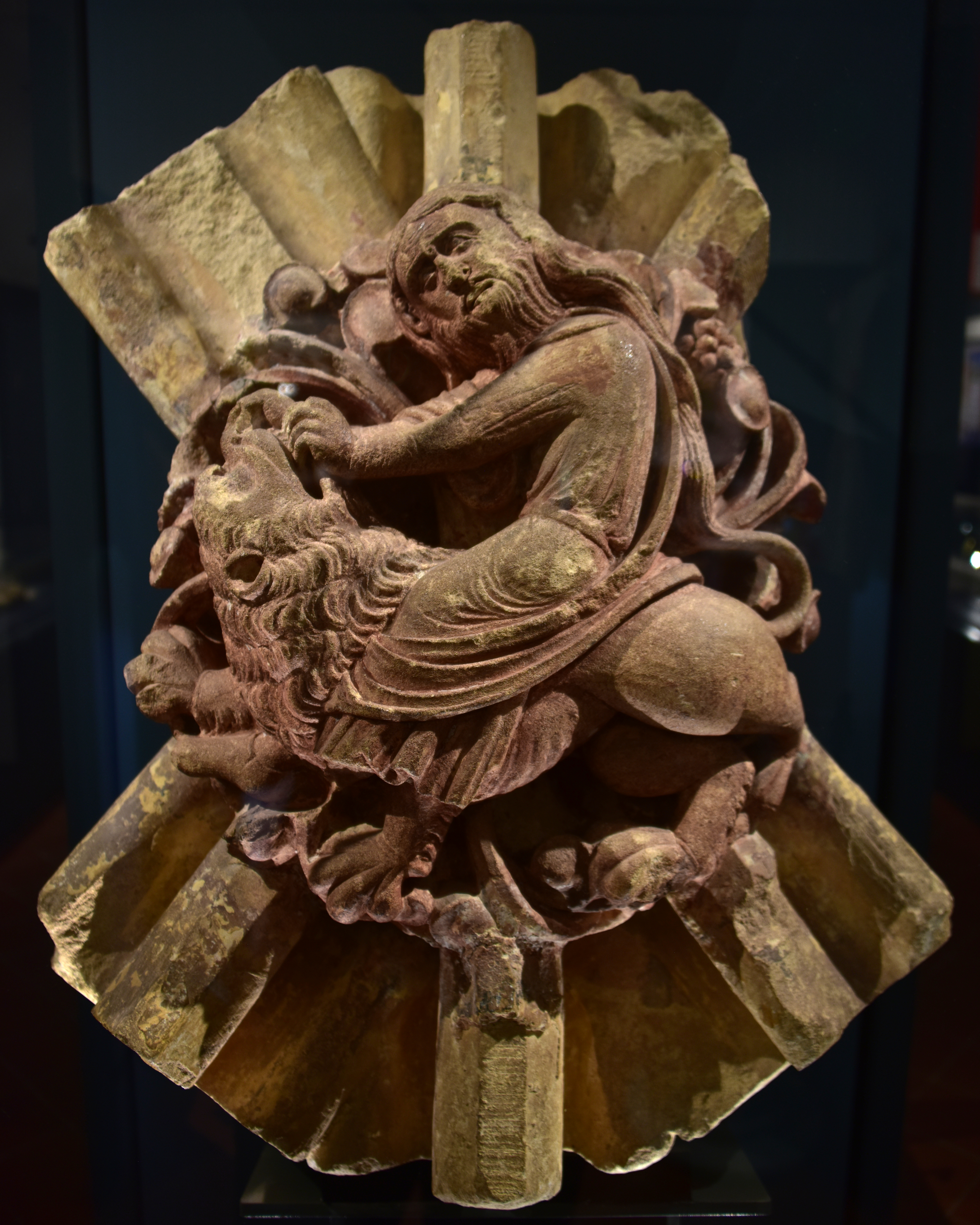
Boss of Samson wrestling a lion, from Hailes Abbey

The abbey was founded in 1246 by Richard of Cornwall, the younger brother of Henry III. Richard was elected by the German Princes as Holy Roman Emperor but Pope Alexander IV refused him use of the title, henceforth he was styled King of the Romans. Richard founded the abbey to thank God after surviving a shipwreck. Richard had been granted the manor of Hailes by King Henry, and settled it with a group of twenty Cistercian monks and ten lay brothers, led by Prior Jordan, from Beaulieu Abbey in Hampshire. The great Cistercian abbey was entirely built in a single campaign in 1277, and was consecrated in a royal ceremony that included the King and Queen and 15 bishops. It was one of the last Cistercian houses to be founded in England.

Hailes Abbey became a site of pilgrimage after Richard's son Edmund donated to the Cistercian community a phial of the Holy Blood, purchased in Germany, in 1270. Such a relic of the Crucifixion was a considerable magnet for pilgrimage. From the proceeds, the monks of Hailes were able to rebuild the Abbey on a magnificent scale. One Abbot of Hailes was executed as a rebel after the Battle of Bramham Moor, in 1408.

Though King Henry VIII's commissioners declared the famous relic to be nothing but the blood of a duck, regularly renewed, and though the Abbot, Stephen Sagar, admitted that the Holy Blood was a fake in hope of saving the Abbey, Hailes Abbey was one of the last religious institutions to acquiesce following the Suppression of Religious Houses Act 1535. The Abbot and his monks finally surrendered their abbey to Henry's commissioners on Christmas Eve 1539.

Following the Dissolution, the west range consisting of the Abbot's own apartments was converted into a house and was home to the Tracy family in the seventeenth century, but these buildings were later demolished and now all that remains are a few low arches in a meadow with outlines in the grass. Surviving remains include the small church for the disappeared parish, with unrestored medieval wall-paintings.

In 1937 the site was donated to the National Trust and in 1948 the Ministry of Works, a predecessor of English Heritage, assumed responsibility for the abbey.

== Burials ==
Among those buried at the Abbey were the founder, Richard of Cornwall, his second wife, Sanchia of Provence, and his sons, Edmund, 2nd Earl of Cornwall and Henry of Almain.

== Hailes Church ==
Hailes Church
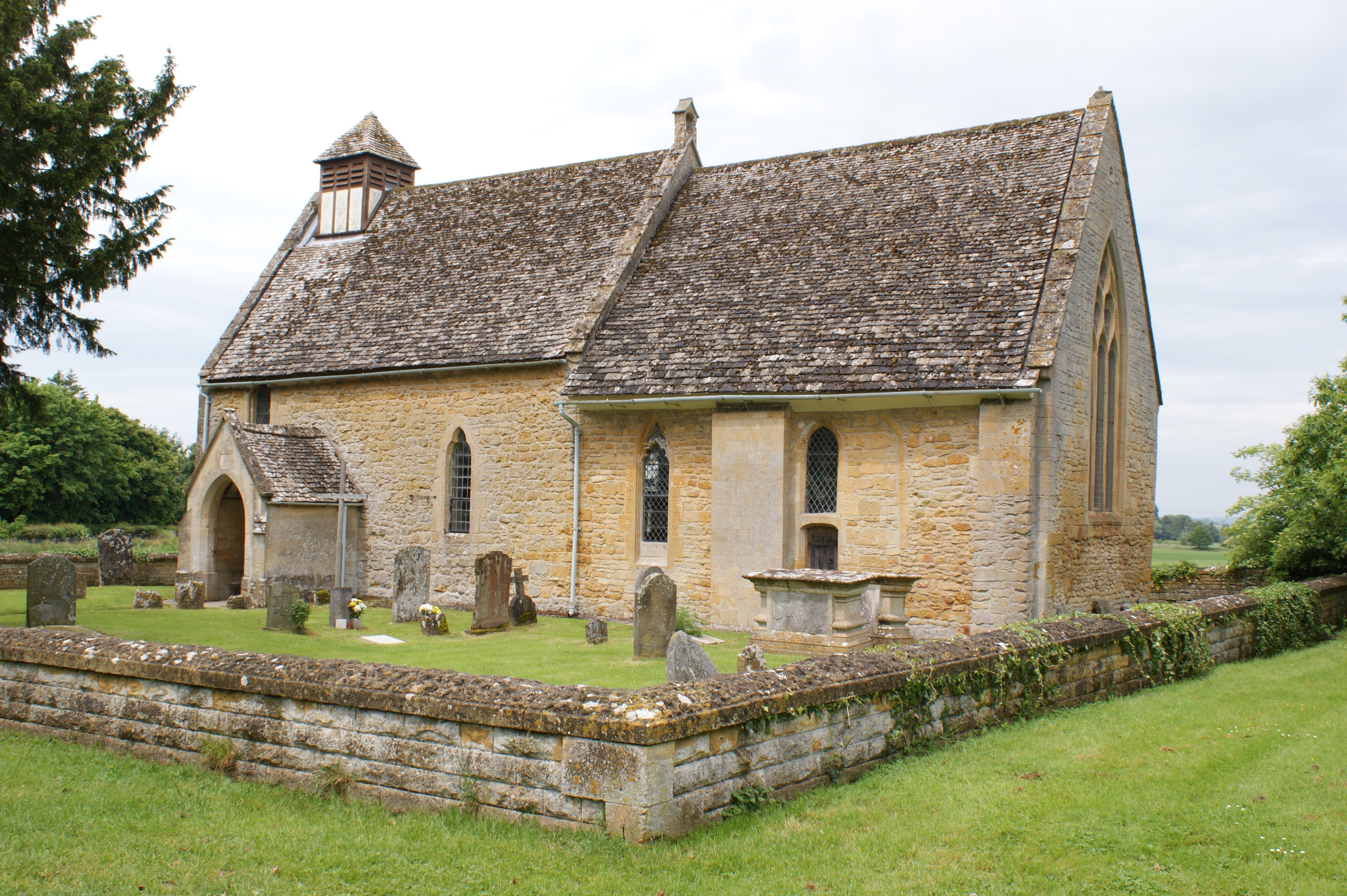
- Hailes Church
- Interactive map of Hailes Church

History
- Built: 1175

Listed Building – Grade I
- Official name: Church (dedication unknown)
- Designated: 4 July 1960
- Reference no.: 1154315

Outside the remains of the Abbey is Hailes Church. The church is older than the abbey, and was consecrated in 1175. It later served as the capella ante portas (Latin for 'chapel outside the gates') to the Abbey until the Abbey's dissolution in 1539. Inside the church are fine 14th-century wall paintings depicting St Catherine and St Christopher, on the north wall, and St Margaret and coursing scenes, on the south. The church is also a Grade I listed building. The church is part of the Eastern Parishes benefice, north of Winchcombe, and occasional services are held.

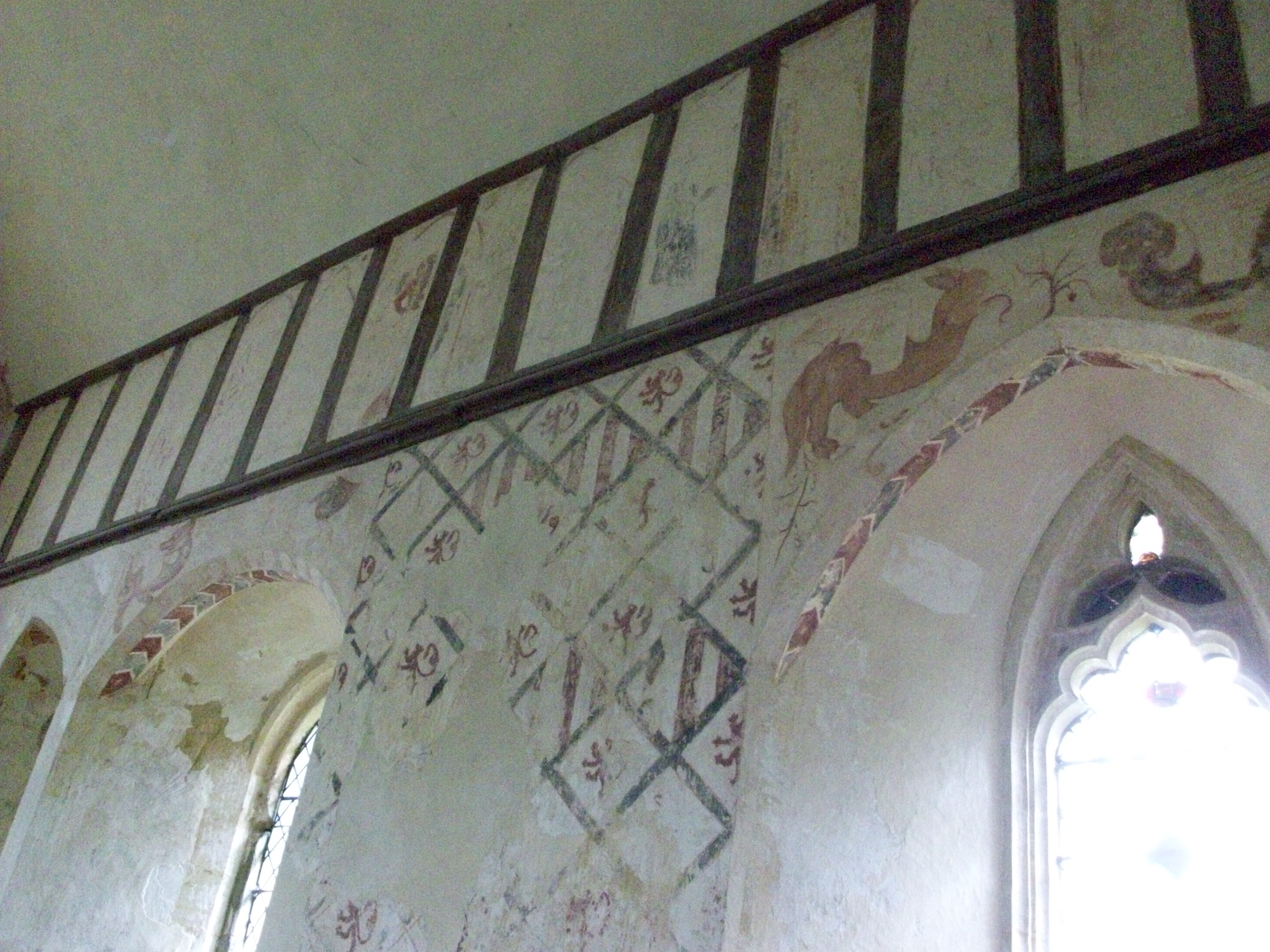
Hailes Church's medieval paintings

== See also ==
- Ashridge Priory, Hertfordshire which also received a relic of the Holy Blood
- Hailes Castle, Gloucestershire
- Hayles Abbey Halt railway station
