= Matilda de Bailleul =

Flemish abbess (c. 1132 – 1212)

- Born: c. 1132
- Died: 14 December 1212 (aged 79–80); Wherwell Abbey
- Other name: Maud
- Occupation: Abbess
- Known for: a transforming abbess of Wherwell Abbey
- Successor: Euphemia de Walliers

Matilda de Bailleul aka Maud (c.1132 – 14 December, 1212) was a Flemish abbess of the English Wherwell Abbey. She arrived in 1173 and transformed the abbey that had few nuns following damage done by William of Ypres years before. She annotated and then gifted an illuminated psalter to her successors which is known as the Saint Bertin psalter.

== Life ==
She was born in about 1132. Matilda de Bailleul came from a noble family. Her father Baldwin and her brother also Baldwin were castellans of Bailleul, Ypres, and Oudenburg. Her mother Euphemia was a grand daughter of a Castellan of St Omer and her family had included the founding Knight Templar Godfrey de Saint-Omer.

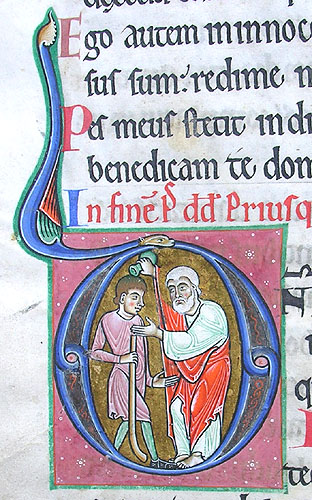
Samuel anointing David - an illumination of Psalm 26 from her Saint Bertin Psalter

In about 1173, Matilda de Bailleul arrived from Flanders at Wherwell. She made good on the damage done by William of Ypres during the Anarchy in 1141. The damage had been done despite the fortifications added by Empress Matilda. King Stephen's troops burnt the abbey after Matilda's men retreated into it.

de Bailleul organised a funding system for the abbey. Thomas a Beckett had been murdered in 1173 and after he died the abbey had a silver goblet and a gilded chalice that were noted because they had been used by Thomas a Beckett. As the abbey had no relics it is speculated that these drinking vessels were used to attract funding. Matilda is said to have installed lighting as well as ornaments in the abbey.

On 21 May 1194 the pope Celestine III wrote to de Bailleul and the nuns at the Abbey. He acknowledged the reversal in the abbey's fortunes and he required others to respect the achievement and the Abbey.

By 1200, she had a psalter in her personal possession which is believed to have been made by scribes and an artist associated with St Albans Abbey in Hertfordshire. It is not clear how it came into her possession or who it was made for. It may have been made for her maternal great uncle, Osto of Saint-Omer. She added details to the psalter of her relatives obituaries and prayers.

== Death and legacy ==
She died in 1212 and by that time the number of nuns had grown from not many to forty. The psalter was passed down to her spiritual successors who also added annotations. The psalter is now in the possession of St John's College, Cambridge.

Matilda was succeeded by Euphemia de Walliers. Euphemia was Matilda's niece and she also came from Flanders. She would serve as Abbess until 26 April 1257.
