= Rout of Winchester =

Conflict within the Anarchy (civil war)

Coordinates: 51°03′38″N 1°18′45″W

- Part of The Anarchy
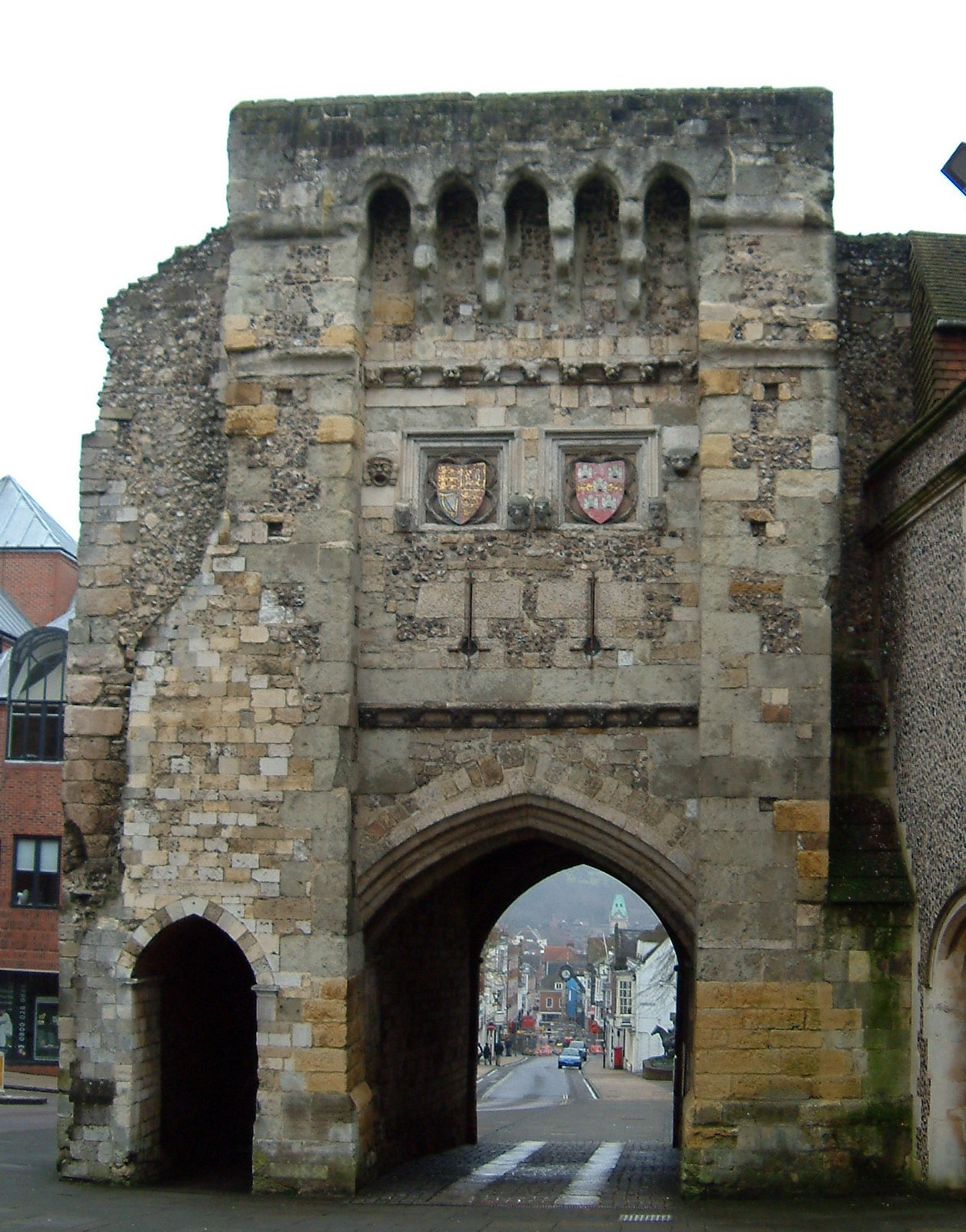
- West Gate, Winchester, Hampshire
Date	14 September 1141
Location	Winchester, England
Result	Blesevin victory

Belligerents
House of Blois	Angevins

Commanders and leaders
Queen Matilda; Henry of Blois; William of Ypres	Empress Matilda; Robert of Gloucester (POW); Reginald of Cornwall

Strength
Unknown	Unknown

Casualties and losses
Light	Main body destroyed, rear guard captured

In the Rout of Winchester (14 September 1141) the army of imprisoned King Stephen of England, led by his wife, Queen Matilda, Stephen's brother Bishop Henry of Winchester, and William of Ypres, faced the army of Stephen's cousin Empress Matilda, whose forces were commanded by her half-brother Earl Robert of Gloucester. After Empress Matilda's army besieged a castle on the edge of Winchester, Queen Matilda's army arrived and blockaded the Angevin army within the city. Cut off from supplies, the Angevin army gave up the siege, then was crushed as it began to retreat. Robert of Gloucester was captured and was subsequently exchanged for Stephen, who was returned to the throne of England. However, the civil war known as The Anarchy dragged on with neither side gaining an advantage.

== Background ==
=== Stephen usurps the throne ===
When William Adelin drowned in the White Ship, King Henry I of England was left with no male heirs. A second marriage to 18-year-old Adeliza of Louvain would produce no children, leaving the widowed Empress Matilda as his only legitimate surviving child. Henry declared Matilda his heir and the English nobility agreed. The first person to swear fealty to Matilda was Stephen of Blois who was the son of Adela of Normandy, the daughter of William the Conqueror. Henry arranged for Matilda to marry the much younger Geoffrey Plantagenet, Count of Anjou, and though the marriage was stormy, it finally produced a son, Henry Plantagenet.

When King Henry died in the Duchy of Normandy he reiterated that Empress Matilda was his heir. Nevertheless, Stephen immediately set out for England. He crossed the English Channel from Wissant to Dover and then made his way to London with a few retainers. The people of London acclaimed him king, followed by the nobility and the dead king's ministers. Stephen was crowned on Christmas Eve 1135. During this time, Empress Matilda was powerless to act because her husband Count Geoffrey was busy trying to put down a rebellion in Anjou. Very soon, Stephen's leadership attracted enemies. A Scottish army under King David I invaded the north but was defeated at the Battle of the Standard in August 1138. Empress Matilda and Robert of Gloucester, an illegitimate son of Henry I, landed at Portsmouth with 140 men.

=== Civil War ===
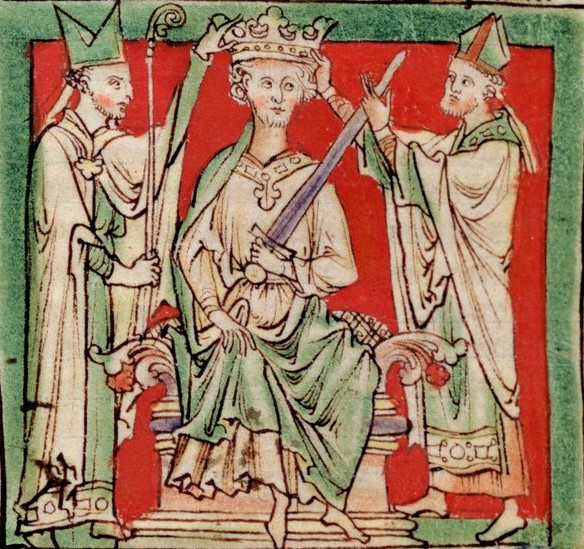
King Stephen's coronation

Empress Matilda and her party took refuge at Arundel Castle where they were welcomed by King Henry's widow Adeliza and her new husband William d'Aubigny. Robert of Gloucester rode to Bristol to rally support for the empress. Stephen quickly assembled an army and surrounded Arundel Castle, demanding that the empress be handed over to him. Though her garrison was weak, Adeliza sent word that she would fight it out. At this point Stephen committed an astonishing blunder by giving Empress Matilda a safe-conduct pass to Bristol and withdrawing his army. When his enemy reached safety, the civil war broke out in full fury. While London and the east remained loyal to Stephen, the west declared for the empress. Stephen hired a body of Flemish mercenaries under William of Ypres, antagonizing his English subjects. The system of justice established under Henry I went to pieces and the common people suffered under the harsh demands of local noblemen and officials.

In December 1140, Stephen began the siege of Lincoln Castle which had been captured by the rebel Earl Ranulf of Chester. Ranulf slipped away and got in contact with Robert of Gloucester, his father-in-law. Robert and Ranulf quickly gathered an army and marched to Lincoln. Until too late Stephen refused to believe that his enemies would make a move in winter. On 2 February 1141 in the Battle of Lincoln Stephen's army was defeated and he was captured. Empress Matilda entered London but her arrogant and hostile conduct soon alienated the people. On 24 June, the people of London chased the empress from the city. The forces of Stephen's queen, also named Matilda (Matilda of Boulogne), soon occupied London. Stephen's brother, Henry of Blois, the Bishop of Winchester, who had earlier defected to Empress Matilda's Angevin faction, changed sides again to support Queen Matilda.

== Siege and Battle ==
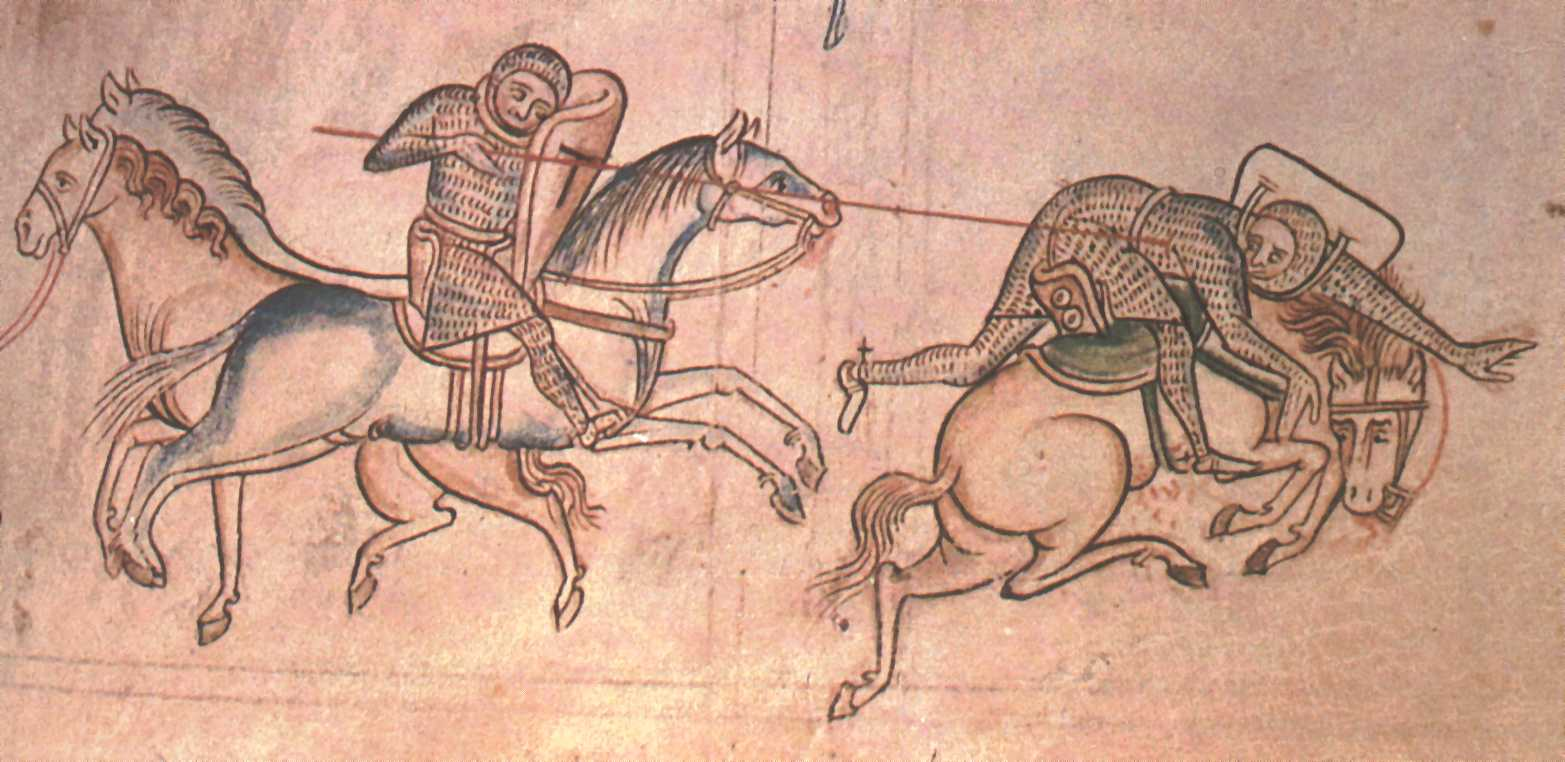
Mounted combat in the 1100s

Bishop Henry took a force to Winchester where he laid siege to the royal castle which was garrisoned by Angevins. Winchester's royal castle was located on the southwest side of the city, while an episcopal castle was on the southeast side. Only two other English cities at the time had more than one castle, London with three and York with two. When she heard of the bishop's incursion Empress Matilda determined to strike back. She gathered an army of her adherents and sortied from her base at Oxford around 28 July 1141. When the empress appeared before Winchester on 31 July it was a complete surprise. Bishop Henry fled the city while his soldiers retreated to Wolvesey Castle, the one belonging to the church.

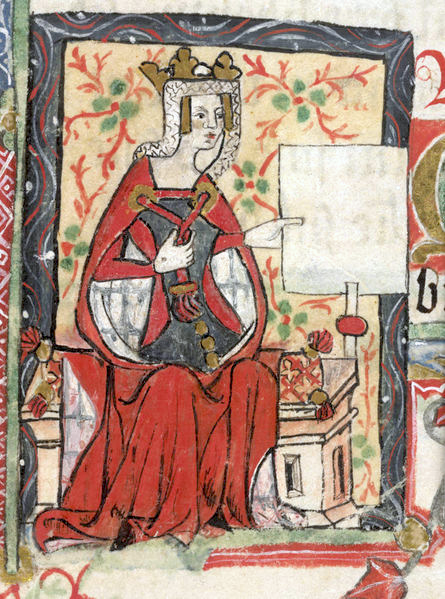
Empress Matilda

While the Angevin host placed Wolvesey Castle under siege, Empress Matilda set up her headquarters in the royal castle and Robert of Gloucester established his command post near Winchester Cathedral (then Saint Swithun's). On August 2, the bishop's men set fire to Winchester, destroying a large part of the city. Wolvesey was a tough nut to crack. It was erected in 1138 and being in the corner of the city walls, could easily contact the outside world. Nevertheless, the Angevins put strong pressure on its defenders.

Queen Matilda quickly assembled an army of relief that included mercenaries hired by Bishop Henry, a levy of the queen's feudal tenants from the County of Boulogne, the nearly 1,000-strong London militia, William of Ypres' Flemish mercenary cavalry and other supporters of Stephen. The queen's army set up camp on the east side of Winchester and proceeded to blockade Empress Matilda's forces in the city. While the queen's army was well-provisioned, the Angevin forces soon began to suffer from lack of food. To weaken the blockade, Robert of Gloucester attempted to fortify Wherwell Abbey, six miles to the north of the city, but William of Ypres defeated the Angevins with heavy losses.

The supply situation convinced Robert of Gloucester that he must quit Winchester so he planned an orderly withdrawal. Earl Reginald of Cornwall and Brian fitz Count led an advance guard composed of crack troops designed to protect Empress Matilda. The main body guarded the baggage while Robert commanded the rearguard. On 14 September, the Angevins exited from the west side of Winchester on the road to Salisbury. Ahead of them, about 8.5 miles (13.7 km) to the northwest, the road crossed the River Test at Stockbridge.

As soon as the Angevin host left the city the queen's army attacked. They pressed past the rearguard to attack the main body. The advance guard avoided the trap and delivered Empress Matilda safely to Gloucester, but the queen's army destroyed the Angevin main body as an effective fighting force; only remnants managed to escape. Robert of Gloucester's soldiers held together, but when his soldiers reached the Test they could go no further. Surrounded by a part of the queen's troops under William of Surrey and facing a bridge choked with panicked Angevins, Robert surrendered with his men.

== Result ==
Queen Matilda offered to exchange Robert of Gloucester for her husband Stephen, but Empress Matilda refused to give up her royal prisoner. She would swap Robert for 12 earls and some gold, but not for the king. Therefore, the queen contacted Robert's wife Amabel, who had custody of Stephen. Behind the empress' back, the two wives determined to exchange their two husbands, and both Stephen and Robert were released.

The civil war went on with neither side gaining an advantage. Meanwhile, the common people suffered under the oppression of the local barons, who took the law into their own hands. It was said that, "God and all His saints were asleep" during these grim years. Robert of Gloucester died on 31 October 1147. With her best leader gone, Empress Matilda retired to Anjou and there was a lull in the fighting. Queen Matilda died on 3 May 1152 and was buried at Faversham Abbey. In January 1153, the empress' son Henry landed in England and began seeking combat with Stephen. At Wallingford another battle was averted when the two parties agreed that Stephen would remain king during his lifetime, but that Henry Plantagenet would succeed him. Stephen died on 25 October 1154.
