= Euphemia de Walliers =

Flemish Benedictine nun and abbess

- Born: 1100s
- Died: 26 April 1257
- Occupation: Nun
- Known for: Abbess of Wherwell Abbey
- Predecessor: Matilda de Bailleul

Euphemia de Walliers (1100s – 26 April 1257), also known as Euphemia of Wherwell, was a Benedictine nun of Flemish descent who became the abbess of Wherwell Abbey. She is known for building and rebuilding at the abbey whilst the number of nuns rose by 40 to 80 during her management.

== Background ==
Her mother was Margaret de Walliers and her father is considered to be Theodore de Walliers although her birthplace and birthday are unknown. In 1212 she was a nun at Wherwell Abbey when her aunt, Matilda de Bailleul, died. Matilda is regarded to have been Euphemia's maternal aunt, with Euphemia being named after Matilda's mother, Euphemia of St. Omer. Her aunt had been the abbess and de Walliers was elected as her replacement. She became head of an abbey with four prebends with forty nuns and she was also given a psalter which had belonged to her predecessor. She served as the abbess from 1213 to her death in 1257. The Saint Bertin psalter is still extant and Euphemia was the second abbess to add annotation and details to it. This is why the name of her mother is known and her father's name can be implied.

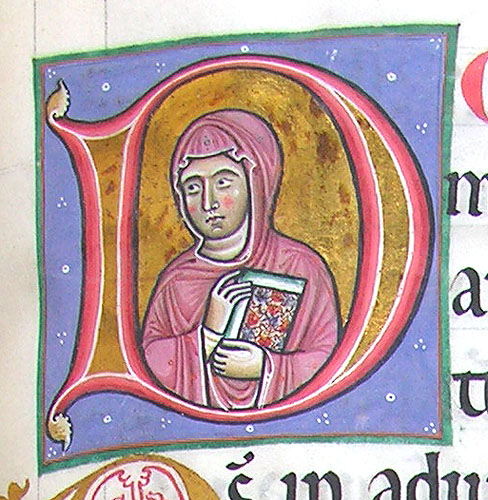
Virgin Mary Illumination from the Abbess's Saint Bertin Psalter

Her predecessor, Maud/Matilda de Bailleul, had reestablished the abbey after it was burned during the Anarchy in 1141. Continuing her aunt's work, de Walliers constructed a great number of buildings for and expanded the abbey during her time as abbess. Euphemia was often complimented on her "manly spirit."

== Abbess of Wherwell ==
Construction and Reconstruction of Wherwell Abbey

As the surviving cartulary records, Euphemia built a new farmery, dorter and latrines with running water, all away from the main buildings, and nearby a chapel of the Blessed Virgin, with a large enclosed garden. By the river bank, she constructed other buildings leaving access to the river for the nuns. She cleared older buildings and built a new hall for the manor court, and further away a new efficient mill. She completely rebuilt the dilapidated manor house at Middleton, and she took similar measures at Tufton. She was attentive to charitable works and in providing hospitality.

She embellished the Norman church that had replaced the original Saxon church with crosses, reliquaries, precious stones, vestments, and books. When the decaying bell tower collapsed on to the dorter in the early hours, narrowly missing the nuns, she built a tall and handsome replacement that matched the remaining buildings and in her old age she had dismantled and rebuilt with 12-foot deep foundations the sanctuary of the church.

Euphemia is also responsible for the construction of "The Stables," a building that upon archaeological evaluation of the roofing, floorplan, and location is considered to have been an infirmary. This evaluation included coring the very sooted section of roof timbers which yielded the years of 1250 and 1280, indicating two different construction stages. This finding contradicted the initial belief that both of the current structures of the Wherwell Priory and "The Stables" had been built during the 18th century at the earliest. Evidence from the length of "The Stables" indicates the first construction stage in 1250 would have had at least seven bays and in 1280 there would have been at least ten, concluding that "The Stables" would have been a quite large infirmary for the time. In 1387, the bishop William of Wykeham imposed on the Wherwell Abbey that the "hospital", infirmary and hospital being virtually synonymous during this time period, should keep certain rations only for poor women and prioritize caring for the poor over the affluent.

Beneath the infirmary, there was a water channel that could have aided the infirmary by removing toxins per medieval understandings of health.

Nun Literacy

Euphemia herself is considered to have been literate in Latin. Furthermore, there is existence of changes made to the Wherwell Psalter and Lat.Q.v.I.62 and writing of Euphemia's obituary serve as evidence that other Wherwell Abbey nuns were literate in Latin.

== Medieval Medical Practitioner ==
Another facet of Euphemia's life as a nun and abbess was her role as a medieval female physician and medic. The definition of a physician or medic is significantly different for medieval figures than modern figures; however, in addition to Euphemia's work in creating a good environment to care for people, she is also described in the cartulary as caring for everyone and providing any necessities. The gardens she grew at the abbey also offered the ingredients for herbal remedies for use in the infirmary.

== Death and legacy ==
She died on 26 April 1257 and it is presumed that she was buried in the Abbey's church. de Walliers had added details of her relatives' obituaries and prayers to the psalter given to her by her predecessor, Matilda. The psalter continued to be passed down and it is now in St John's College, Cambridge. Her legacy of charity and hospitality continued after her death as her final act as abbess was to provide from the nuns and the poor, and the infirmary continued to serve those in need.
