= Wherwell Abbey =

Abbey of Benedictine nuns in Wherwell, Hampshire, England

- Interactive map of Wherwell Abbey

Monastery information
- Other names: St. Cross, Wherwell
- Established: 986
- Disestablished: 1539

People
- Founders: Ælfthryth, widow of King Edgar

Site
- Location: Wherwell, Hampshire, England
- Coordinates: 51°09′56″N 01°26′30″W
- Visible remains: none

Wherwell Abbey was an house of Benedictine nuns in Wherwell, Hampshire, England. It was founded in the mid-tenth century and continued until the Dissolution of the Monasteries in 1539.

== Foundation ==
It is not known when the nunnery was founded. The earliest contemporary reference is in a charter of Æthelred the Unready in 1002 granting land to the abbey and Abbess Heanflæd. According to the twelfth-century historian William of Malmesbury, Queen Ælfthryth was responsible for the murder of her stepson, King Edward the Martyr in 978, and she founded Wherwell in penance, and this is supported a fourteenth-century Wherwell cartulary. Some historians accept this account, but others are sceptical. Pauline Stafford states that Ælfthryth took control of Wherwell and ousted the abbess when she was given responsibity for nunneries in about 970, and Sarah Foot argues that "new light" is thrown on Wherwell's origins by a petition from the abbey to the king in 1344 which states that it was founded by Alfred, son of Osgar, in 962, before Ælfthryth became queen. "Osgar" may be an error for Ælfthryth's father Ordgar.

In 1051 King Edward the Confessor repudiated his wife Edith and sent her to the abbess of Wherwell, who was his sister but whose name is not known. Wherwell benefited from strong connections with the West Saxon royal house in the tenth and eleventh centuries, but at the time of the Norman Conquest it was one of the poorest nunneries in the country.

== Later history ==
During the Anarchy in 1141, the Empress Matilda's forces fortified the abbey, but they were defeated by King Stephen's troops. Matilda's men fled into the abbey, which was then burned by Stephen's troops commanded by William of Ypres. Traces of the earthworks built by the Empress Matilda's forces are visible today.

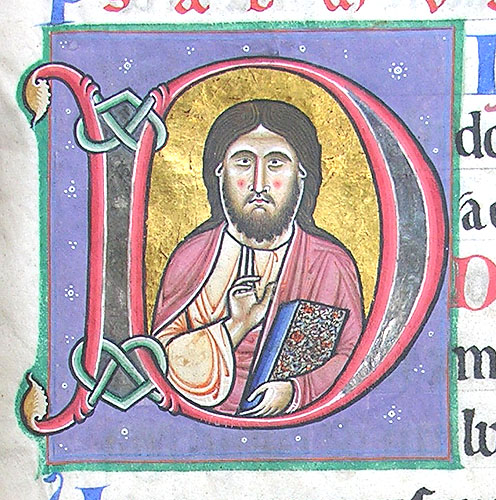
Christ holding a book, with his hand raised in blessing - An illumination from the Saint Bertin Psalter passed down to Wherwell abbesses by Matilda de Bailleul

In about 1173 Matilda de Bailleul (aka Maud.) arrived from Flanders. She made good on the damage done by William of Ypres. She organised a funding system for the abbey establishing four prebends. Thomas Becket had been murdered in 1170 and after he died the abbey had a silver goblet and a gilded chalice that were noted because they had been used by revered Thomas a Becket. As the abbey had no relics it is speculated that these drinking vessels were used to attract funding. Matilda is said to have installed lighting as well as ornaments in the abbey.

On 21 May 1194 the pope Celestine III wrote to de Bailleul and the nuns at the Abbey, acknowledging the reversal in the abbey's fortunes. By then the abbess had had a psalter in her possession which is believed to have been made by two scribes and an artist associated with St Albans Abbey in Hertfordshire. She added details to the psalter of her relatives obituaries and prayers.

Matilda died in 1212 and by that time the number of nuns had grown from not many to forty. Matilda was succeeded by her niece Euphemia de Walliers. Matilda's psalter was passed down to her spiritual successors who also added annotations. The psalter is now in the possession of St John's College, Cambridge. Euphemia was Matilda's niece and she also came from Flanders. She would serve as Abbess until 26 April 1257.

Euphemia seems to have been a veritable whirlwind. Events include many undated charters relating to small gifts or grants was made. Like Matilda (Maud?), she seems to have been well loved by the nuns, as the surviving cartulary records. Euphemia built a new farmery, dorter and areas for other functions, such as latrines with running water, all away from the main buildings, and nearby a chapel of the Blessed Virgin, with a large enclosed garden. By the river bank, she constructed other practical buildings, but left access to the river for the nuns. She cleared sordid older buildings that were a fire risk and built a new hall for the manor court, and further away a new and efficient mill She rebuilt from the ground up the dilapidated manor house at Middleton, and took similar measures at Tufton. She was attentive to charitable works and in providing hospitality.

She embellished the Norman church that had replaced the original Saxon church after the Conquest with crosses, reliquaries, precious stones, vestments, and books. When the decaying bell tower collapsed on to the dorter in the early hours, narrowly missing the nuns, she built a tall and handsome replacement that matched the remaining buildings and in her old age she had dismantled and rebuilt with 12-foot deep foundations the sanctuary of the church.

Abbess Euphemia also oversaw a significant expansion in the size of the community with the number of nuns being housed reaching 80. The Black Death later cut this number to single figures.

In 1291 the temporalities of the Wherwell Abbey were valued at a very considerable £201 18s. 5½d., in addition to which the abbess received pensions of £1 10s. from the church of Wallop and £1 6s. 8d. from the church of Berton.

That same year, on 12 August, Pope Nicholas IV granted a relaxation of one year and forty days to penitents practising imposed penance who visited the Abbey church of Wherwell, on the four feasts of the Blessed Virgin, and on that of the Holy Cross and its octave.

In larger monastic houses of both men and women, the sacristan held a highly responsible post and at Wherwell was the beneficiary of specific income from dedicated rents. During the time of another abbess Maud (1333-1340) an inventory of the valuables in the sacristan’s custody was compiled. It detailed two precious chalices donated by Abbess Maud herself and Abbess Ellen de Percy and nine other chalices, several for use on a specific altar, two with depictions of St Thomas Becket on the foot, a number of silver and silver gilt ciboria and pyxes to hold the sacred hosts, one in the form of a tower. There were also crosses, basins, cruets for wine and water, candlesticks, censers, incense boats with their spoons, and two crowns (perhaps for crowning a statue of the Virgin), all in silver or silver gilts. This indicates not idle riches, but a certain level of income plus an attention to the dignity of the liturgical services as already seen a century earlier under Abbess Euphemia.

== Other burials ==
- Benjamin Lethieullier
- Cecily Shirley West, wife of Thomas West, 3rd Baron De La Warr

== Dissolution ==
After having been in substance harassed for some years, the abbey was left with no option but to surrender at the Dissolution of the monasteries to the crown on 21 November 1539. The abbess received an annual pension of £40, the prioress one of £6, and twenty-three nuns received pensions of from £5 to £2 13s. 4d.

== Post-dissolution ==
It was originally intended that the site and estates be granted to John Kingsmill, brother of the abbess, but in fact they were granted to Thomas West, 9th Baron De La Warr, after he successfully petitioned Cromwell for it. The manor house of Wherwell Priory was built on the site.

== Present day ==
The abbey has disappeared, but in 1997 a geophysical survey by archaeologists from Southampton University located the foundations under the lawn of the eighteenth-century Wherwell Priory.

A building associated with the Abbey now known as the Stables survives. It is raised isle construction and may originally have been an infirmary. Timbers in the roof date from 1250 and 1280. Originally around 43 meters long nearly half of it has been lost.
