= Baldwin of Clare =

French noble (fl. 1141)

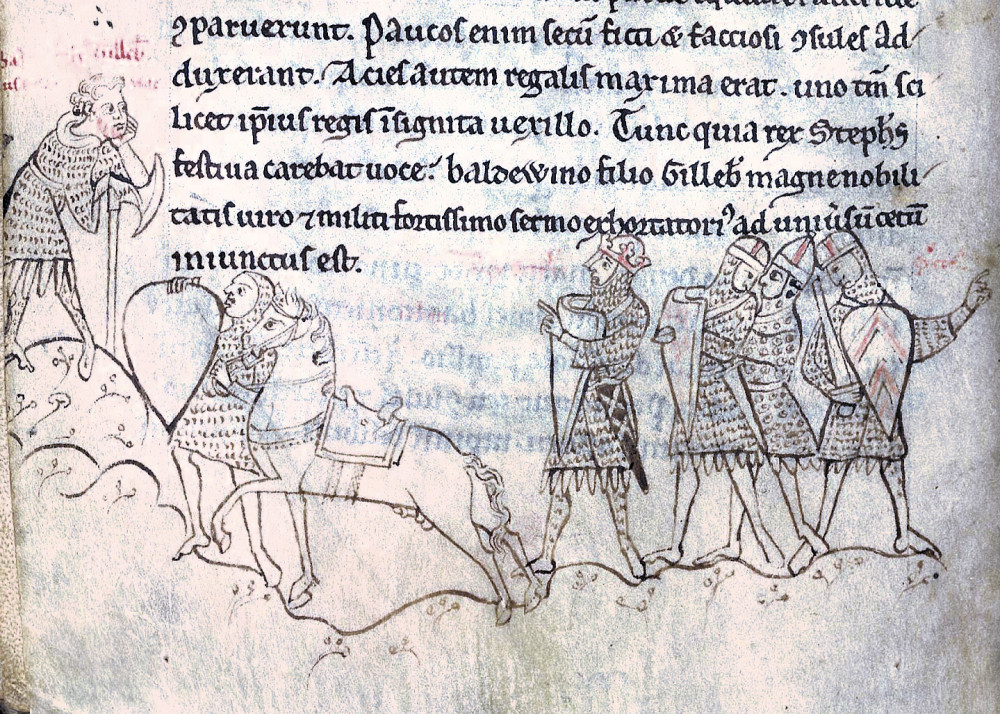
Near-contemporary illustration of the battle of Lincoln; King Stephen (fourth from the right) is listening to Baldwin of Clare orating a battle speech (left).

Baldwin of Clare (fl. 1141) was the youngest son of Gilbert Fitz Richard (de Clare), of the elder branch of the line of Gilbert, count of Eu, grandson of Richard the Fearless.

Baldwin's mother was Adeliza, daughter of the count of Claremont, though William of Jumièges does not mention him among her sons. The manor of Clare, from which Baldwin and others of his family took their name, was one of the estates held by his grandfather Richard in Suffolk. Baldwin's father, Gilbert, received the grant of Ceredigion (Cardiganshire) from Henry I in 1107.

On the death of Henry, Richard, the eldest brother of Baldwin, was slain, and his lands were harried by Morgan ap Owen. King Stephen gave Baldwin a large sum of money to enable him to hire troops for the relief of the lands of his house. Baldwin, however, retreated without, as it seems, striking a single blow. When, in 1141, Stephen's army was drawn up before the battle of Lincoln, the king, because his own voice was weak, deputed Baldwin to make a speech to the host. The Arundel MS. of the History of Henry of Huntingdon (twelfth or thirteenth century) contains an outline drawing of Baldwin addressing the royal army in the presence of the king.

In this speech, Baldwin set forth the goodness of the cause of Stephen and the evil character of his enemies, reviling Robert, Earl of Gloucester, as having the heart of a hare. In this battle, however, Baldwin fought bravely and received many wounds. He stood by the king to the last and was taken prisoner with him.

Baldwin was a benefactor of the abbey of Bec.

Richard (Earl of Striguil), the invader of Ireland, was the son of his brother, Gilbert.

== Family ==
Baldwin married Adeline de Rollos and had a daughter, Emma, who married Hugh Wake, and by him had sons Baldwin, Geoffrey and Hugh.
