= Marie of Boulogne =

Countess, English princess, and abbess (1136–1182)

Marie

Countess of Boulogne
- Reign: 1160–1169
- Predecessor: William I
- Successor: Matthew
- Born: 1136
- Died: 1182 (aged 45–46)
- Spouse: Matthew of Alsace (m. 1160; ann. 1170)
- Issue: Ida, Countess of Boulogne; Matilda, Duchess of Brabant
- House: House of Blois
- Father: Stephen, King of England
- Mother: Matilda I, Countess of Boulogne

Marie (1136–1182), also called Mary of Blois, was an English princess and nun and the countess of Boulogne in the 1160s. The daughter of King Stephen and Matilda of Boulogne, she was dedicated to the Church as a child and made prioress of Higham. In the late 1150s, she was elected abbess of Romsey. Upon the death of her brother William in 1159, she became heir to the County of Boulogne in northern France. The following year, she was taken from her abbey by Matthew of Alsace, who married her and claimed the county. The couple separated in 1169 after intense pressure from the Church. She then returned to religious life, but remained involved in the governance of the county and the upbringing of their daughters, Ida and Matilda.

== Family ==
Mary was born in or near London in late 1136. She was the last child born to Stephen of Blois and Matilda of Boulogne, the newly crowned king and queen of England. She was named after her maternal grandmother, Mary of Scotland, countess of Boulogne. Two of her siblings, Matilda and Baldwin, died in childhood, leaving her with two brothers, Eustace and William. Queen Matilda had inherited the County of Boulogne in northern France from her father, Count Eustace III, setting the precedent for female succession. The other mainland possession of Mary's parents, the Duchy of Normandy, was lost in the Anarchy, their struggle with their cousin Empress Matilda, who also claimed the English throne.

== Religious life ==
Mary's parents were avid patrons of monastic orders, and she was dedicated to the Church already as a child. She spent some time at the Abbey of Saint-Sulpice-la-Forêt, a Benedictine convent near Rennes in Brittany. Its cartulary names her as an abbess, but gives impossible dates; it seems to be a coincidence that Saint-Sulpice's abbess, who held the office from at least 1124 to her death in 1159, was also named Mary. In Brittany, King Stephen's daughter was safely distanced from the Anarchy. By 1148, she and a group of nuns from Saint-Sulpice had moved to Saint Leonard's Priory in Stratford-by-Bow near London. This may have coincided with the death of Empress Matilda's chief supporter, Earl Robert of Gloucester, in 1147. Saint Leonard's was easily accessible to Queen Matilda, whose vast English estates—the honour of Boulogne—were centered in its area. Mary's parents donated a manor, Lillechurch, to the priory when Mary and her companions joined it.

Mary was unhappy at Saint Leonard's. The nuns who came from Brittany complained about the austerity of life at their new house. At some point between 1148 and 1152, Mary's parents intervened. Her mother mediated in the dispute alongside Archbishop Theobald of Canterbury, Bishop Hilary of Chichester, and Abbot Clarembald of Faversham. An agreement was reached by which the Stratford nuns renounced Lillechurch under the condition that it would be used to establish a new house for the rebel nuns; this led to the founding of Higham Priory, with Mary as its first prioress.

Mary's brother Eustace was made count of Boulogne in 1147. After the death of Queen Matilda in 1152, King Stephen agreed to be succeeded by Empress Matilda's son Henry of Anjou. Eustace died childless in 1153, whereupon Boulogne and the Boulonnais estates in England passed to Mary's last surviving brother, William. When their father died in 1154, Henry II became king of England, while William inherited the County of Mortain in Normandy and the English honours of Lancaster and Eye. Like Eustace before him, William supported Mary's priory, which quickly became prosperous.

Between early 1156 and early 1158, Mary left Lillechurch to become abbess of the prestigious Romsey Abbey. The abbey may have sought a highborn abbess who could further its ambition for expansion. In addition to her royal heritage, Mary could count on the support of her powerful uncle Henry of Blois, bishop of Winchester and abbot of Glastonbury. The clergyman Edward Berthon and art historian Fil Hearn attribute to Mary much of the work on the abbey church, while the archaeologist Ian Scott dates the work to the early 12th century. King Henry made a number of grants to Romsey during this time, stressing his kinship with Mary.

== Countess ==
Mary's brother, William, died childless in October 1159. Constance of France—widow of Eustace and by then wife of Henry's enemy Count Raymond V of Toulouse—claimed Boulogne, arguing that it was her dower. In 1160, Henry removed Mary from Romsey and arranged for her to marry his cousin Matthew, the second son of Count Thierry of Flanders. Charters and pipe roll evidence indicate that Mary was recognized as heir to the County of Mortain and at least a part of the honour of Boulogne but renounced her claim to the honours of Eye and Lancaster.

As a nun, Mary was seen as a bride of Christ, and her marriage scandalized chroniclers. Robert of Torigni wrote that Matthew "in an unheard of event led away the abbess of Romsey, who was the daughter of King Stephen, and with her seized the County of Boulogne". Later commentators went further, relating that Matthew abducted Mary. Mary herself is almost exclusively portrayed as a victim. A 13th-century chronicler, Matthew Paris, blames Mary equally, writing that she was "seduced by sophistical letters". Modern historians do not discount the possibility of her collusion. Her kinsman Pharamus of Boulogne urged Henry to write to Pope Alexander III and seek an absolution from monastic vows for Mary. Henry's chancellor, Thomas Becket, condemned the marriage. In response to the marriage, Count Thierry attacked and seized Lens, part of the Boulonnais inheritance. Matthew reconciled with his father in 1161, but Lens was forfeited; Mary and Matthew retained Boulogne as Thierry's vassals. Compared with their predecessors, Mary and Matthew had a smaller sphere of influence.

Mary and Matthew had two daughters, both named after Mary's maternal ancestors. Mary delivered the firstborn, Ida, around 1161. The younger, Matilda, followed around 1162. Matthew was excommunicated by the Church because of his marriage to Mary and their lands were placed under an interdict. When the local tensions subsided, the count and countess became generous patrons of the Church, donating to—among others—Clairmarais Abbey and the Abbey of Saint Wulmer in Samer. Their rule over Boulogne does not appear to have been hampered by ecclesiastical sanctions, and Matthew even demanded Mortain from Henry as Mary's inheritance. Between 1162 and 1164, Henry confiscated the Boulonnais estates in England. In 1167, the couple raised a fleet to raid the English coast. Henry gave them an annual pension in 1168 in return for renouncing Mortain.

Henry, king of England, has sent his ambassadors to the emperor ... The returning ambassadors passed through my territories, and I spoke with them, and well I perceived from their words that the English king ceases not, day nor night, to devise mischief against you. Wherefore I thought it fitting to ... give you the necessary forewarning, that you may take counsel with your wise men, and act as is most fitting, lest the impetuous presumption of the fraudulent king should inflict violent injury upon you. — From Mary's letter to King Louis

Pope Alexander remained determined to separate Mary and Matthew. In 1168, he had announced his support for Countess Constance's claim to Boulogne and gave Mary and Matthew three months to leave Boulogne under the threat of an interdict and excommunication of both. Around this time, Mary reached out to King Louis VII of France, offering intelligence about King Henry's overtures to Louis's enemy Emperor Frederick Barbarossa, which she had picked up from Henry's ambassadors as they passed through her land. Louis held influence with Alexander, whose claim to papacy was challenged by Frederick's candidate, Victor IV, and was also Constance's brother; the language of the letter, Mary's only surviving piece of correspondence, shows Mary to have been bitterly hostile to Henry.

== Return to nunnery ==
Mary's union with Matthew officially ended in 1169. By 1170, they had reached a compromise with the Church. Their marriage was dissolved, but Pope Alexander declared their daughters legitimate. Matthew remained in charge of the county in their name, while Mary returned to monastic life under the pope's protection. She entered the nearby Montreuil Abbey; Desiderius, bishop of Thérouanne, states in a charter that Mary became a nun, but Matthew's charter explains that "the lady Mary" chose Montreuil because "it pleases her", casting her as a laywoman living in a nunnery rather than being veiled.

Around May 1170, Thomas Becket—by then the archbishop of Canterbury—wrote to a nun, referred to as Idonea, about the need to thwart the coronation of Henry II's son Henry the Young King, and instructed her to deliver a letter to the archbishop of York, Roger of Bishop's Bridge, in return for remission of her sins. The historian Anne Duggan proposes that this nun may be Mary.

Even after her resumption of monastic life, Mary retained authority over Boulogne. Matthew required her because she was the heir to the county, and she ratified his charters and negotiated with the Abbey of Saint-Josse when he wanted to build a castle on their land. In 1171, he married Eleanor of Vermandois. On 25 July 1173, he was shot by a crossbow while assisting Henry the Young King in a rebellion against Henry II. As he lay dying, on 8 August 1173, he issued a grant to the Abbey of Saint-Josse with the consent of Mary and their daughters; in the document, witnessed by his brother Philip, Mary's kinsman Pharamus, and Church officials, he still refers to Mary as his wife and countess. Philip took up guardianship over Matthew and Mary's underage daughters. Mary left her nunnery, without papal approval, to take charge of the girls' upbringing and education. She returned after they married, probably in 1177, and Ida became countess. Upon her second return to religious life, Mary established prayers for Matthew. She retained ties with Lillechurch, issuing a grant to her former priory in 1182; she died the same year. She was buried at Montreuil Abbey.

The literary scholar Antoinette Knapton suggests that Mary is the poet Marie de France, citing the poet's familiarity with both courtly and monastic life as well as similarities of Mary's life with the poet's characters: Le Fresne leaves her convent to marry, while Eliduc's wife enters a convent to allow her husband to marry another. The hypothesis has been criticized on the grounds that Mary loathed Henry II, to whom the lais of Marie de France are presumably dedicated, and because of the dating of the Legend of the Purgatory of Saint Patrick to the period after 1189.

Preceded by William I	Countess of Boulogne; 1159–1170 from 1160 with Matthew of Alsace	Succeeded by Matthew
