= Matilda of Boulogne =

Queen of England from 1135 to 1152

Matilda
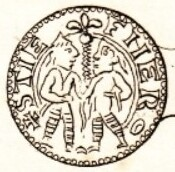
- Matilda and Stephen on their coin

Queen consort of England
- Tenure: 22 December 1135 – 3 May 1152
- Coronation: 22 March 1136

Countess of Boulogne
- Reign: 1125 – 3 May 1152
- Predecessor: Eustace III
- Successor: Eustace IV
- Born: Between 1102 and 1110
- Died: 3 May 1152 (aged 41–50); Hedingham Castle, Essex, England
- Burial: Faversham Abbey
- Spouse: Stephen, King of England (m. 1125)
- Issue more...: Eustace IV, Count of Boulogne; Marie I, Countess of Boulogne; William I, Count of Boulogne
- House: Flanders
- Father: Eustace III, Count of Boulogne
- Mother: Mary of Scotland

Matilda of Boulogne (c. 1105 – 3 May 1152) was the countess of Boulogne in her own right from 1125 and queen of England as the wife of King Stephen from 1135 until her death. She supported Stephen in his struggle for the English throne against their mutual cousin Empress Matilda, a period known as the Anarchy. Historians attribute Stephen's continued hold on the throne to her courage and determination.

Matilda was the daughter of Count Eustace III of Boulogne, from whom she inherited the French County of Boulogne as well as vast estates in England. Her maternal uncle King Henry I of England arranged for her to marry his nephew Stephen of Blois. Henry had intended to be succeeded by his daughter Empress Matilda, but when he died in 1135, Stephen took the throne. Matilda of Boulogne was consequently crowned queen in 1136. Civil war broke out in 1138 when Earl Robert of Gloucester declared for his half-sister Empress Matilda, renouncing his allegiance to King Stephen. Queen Matilda joined her husband in an attempt to quell the rebellion, leading a successful siege of Dover. The conflict intensified in 1139 when Empress Matilda arrived in England to press her claim. Queen Matilda's initial role in the war was primarily that of a diplomat: she brokered peace with her uncle King David I of Scotland and concluded an alliance with King Louis VII of France.

After Stephen's capture at the battle of Lincoln in 1141, Matilda took up the leadership of their faction and began assembling an army. Despite her efforts, the kingdom's clergy recognized the empress as ruler. The empress established herself in London and was on the verge of victory when the queen allied with dissatisfied citizenry and led her army to retake the capital. The queen soon besieged the empress in Winchester and, in the subsequent rout, captured Robert of Gloucester, crippling the empress's war effort. By the end of 1141, she had traded Robert for Stephen.

Matilda continued to advise Stephen and take part in his government, and came to involve herself closely with church affairs. She patronized a variety of religious orders and founded the abbeys of Coggeshall, Faversham, and Lillechurch, as well as Cressing Temple, Temple Cowley and the hospital of St Katharine's by the Tower. She probably pushed Stephen to secure the succession of their son Eustace; after she died, Stephen recognized the empress's son Henry as his heir, ending the Anarchy.

== Early life ==
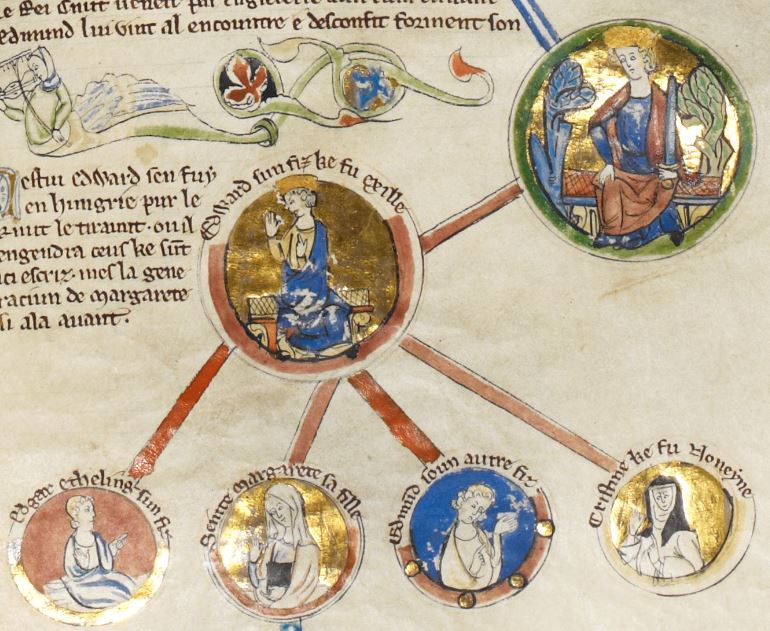
Matilda descended from the Anglo-Saxon king Edmund II of England.

Matilda was born between 1102 and 1110. (Note: Matilda's parents married in 1102. Her mother died in 1115 or in April 1116 at the latest. Because Matilda married probably in 1125, she was most likely born between 1102 and 1110.) She was the only known child of the count of Boulogne, Eustace III, and Mary of Scotland. As such, she was the heir to the counties of Boulogne and Lens in northern France and estates in England known as the Honour of Boulogne. Eustace had taken part in the First Crusade and was the elder brother of the first two rulers of the Kingdom of Jerusalem, Godfrey of Bouillon and King Baldwin I. Matilda was influenced by the memory of her grandmothers, Margaret of Wessex and Ida of Lorraine, who were both venerated for the sanctity of their lives. On her mother's side, she descended from the royal family of Scotland and was a great-great-granddaughter of King Edmund II of England, thus descending from the Anglo-Saxon monarchs who were supplanted by the Normans in 1066. Matilda's father had at least two illegitimate sons, Ralph and Eustace.

It is likely that Matilda spent much of her childhood in England; its queen, Matilda of Scotland, was her mother's sister, and her father regularly participated in King Henry I's military actions and witnessed royal charters. The young Matilda was probably educated at a monastery, perhaps Wilton Abbey, under the supervision of Countess Mary or Queen Matilda, who had both received their education there. King Henry and Queen Matilda had two children: Empress Matilda, who lived in Germany as a result of her marriage to Emperor Henry V, and William Adelin, who was expected to succeed his father as king of England and duke of Normandy. Countess Mary died in 1115 or 1116; the death of Queen Matilda followed in 1118.

When his brother Baldwin died in 1118, Eustace was a candidate for the kingship of Jerusalem and set off to Palestine to claim the throne; because he was far away, the kingdom's nobles elected Baldwin II instead, and Eustace returned to Boulogne. In 1123, Baldwin II was captured in battle, and his vassals began seeking a new king. Eustace was by this time old and his heir, Matilda, unmarried; the nobles desired a king who could lead their army in the field and turned to Charles the Good.

The deaths of Matilda's half-brothers, Ralph and Eustace, cemented her position as heir. Around 1125, Count Eustace and King Henry arranged for Matilda to marry Henry's nephew Stephen of Blois. Since the death of William Adelin in the White Ship disaster in 1120, Stephen was one of the potential successors to King Henry; the others were Henry's illegitimate son Earl Robert of Gloucester and nephews Count Theobald IV of Blois and William Clito. Stephen's claim was strengthened by Matilda's descent from the Anglo-Saxon kings. Though not related to one another, both Stephen and Matilda were first cousins of King Henry's daughter Empress Matilda, Stephen paternally and Matilda maternally.

Matilda's relationship with contemporary leaders

Edmund II of England
William I of England	Matilda of Flanders	Edward the Exile	Agatha
Robert II of Normandy	Malcolm III of Scotland	Margaret of Wessex	Eustace II of Boulogne	Ida of Lorraine
William Clito	Henry I of England	Matilda of Scotland	David I of Scotland	Mary of Scotland	Eustace III of Boulogne	Godfrey of Bouillon	Baldwin I of Jerusalem	Adela of England
Robert of Gloucester	Matilda of England	William Adelin	Henry of Northumberland	Matilda I of Boulogne	Stephen of England	Theobald IV of Blois	Henry of Winchester
Henry II of England	Eustace IV of Boulogne	William I of Boulogne	Mary I of Boulogne

== Countess ==
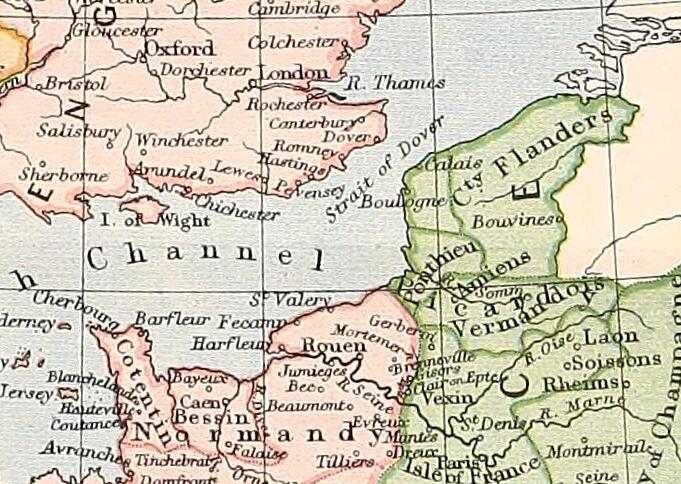
Matilda's inheritance straddled the Dover strait; the rich and strategic County of Boulogne was paired with extensive estates in England.

Count Eustace renounced his titles in 1125 and died as a monk. Matilda became countess of Boulogne in her own right, with Stephen's authority as count deriving from their marriage. Matilda's inheritance included Boulogne and Wissant, the principal continental ports on the shortest route across the Channel to England and a key artery of northern European trade. The administrative center of her English estates was in Colchester, Essex. With Matilda's lands added to Stephen's County of Mortain and the honours of Eye and Lancaster, the couple became central figures in Anglo-Norman politics and leading magnates in southeast England. They governed their lands together and struck coinage with both portraits, but it was Matilda who assumed primary responsibility for day-to-day administration.

The same year Matilda and Stephen married, King Henry's daughter Empress Matilda returned to him as a widow. The king began taking steps to ensure her succession. He had Stephen and other magnates attending his court in January 1127 swear to recognize her as heir; Stephen did so grudgingly. King Louis VI of France recognized William Clito as the new count of Flanders in 1127. Henry sought to prevent William from solidifying his hold on Flanders for fear that he would claim the English throne. He sent Matilda and Stephen to Boulogne to campaign against William; at the same time, he sent the empress to wed Geoffrey of Anjou. The Angevin alliance was unwelcome to much of the Anglo-Norman nobles, including Matilda and Stephen, whose family were rivals of the counts of Anjou. William died in July 1128; Henry, Stephen, and Matilda had good relations with the new count of Flanders, Thierry of Alsace.

The first decade of Matilda and Stephen's marriage saw the birth of most of their children. Their eldest son, Eustace, was born around 1127. The second son, Baldwin, followed around 1131; alternatively, he may have been the twin of a daughter named Matilda, who was born in 1134. Her youngest son, William, was born in December 1135. Geoffrey of Auxerre narrates how, during a difficult pregnancy, Matilda expected to die in childbirth and made arrangements for her funeral, but safely delivered a son–almost certainly William–after meeting with Abbot Bernard of Clairvaux. The story is corroborated by Bernard, who wrote that he considered the child partly his own. Bernard remained Matilda's spiritual mentor and likely a friend.

== Queen ==
=== Initial years ===
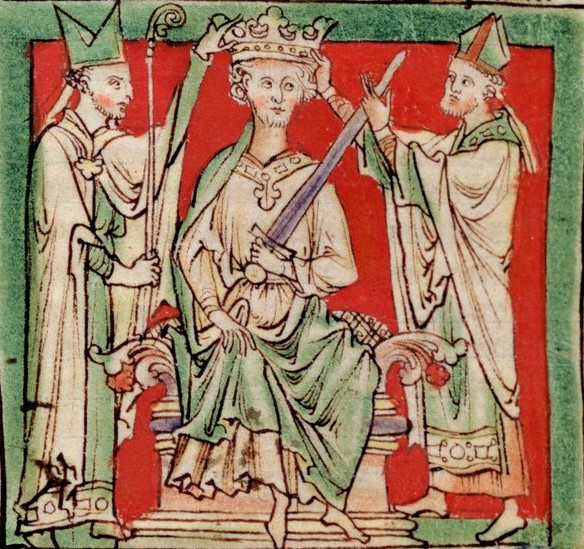
Matilda's husband had himself crowned in spite of his oath to recognize their cousin Empress Matilda as heir.

King Henry I died on 1 December 1135. Stephen was in Boulogne when he received the news of his uncle's death and at once sailed to England, while Matilda stayed behind to recover from childbirth. The king's daughter Empress Matilda, to whom succession had been promised, immediately marched to Normandy and took Argentan, Exmes, Domfront, Sées, and other castles. King David I of Scotland, uncle of both the countess and the empress, invaded England in support of the empress's claim. The citizens of London acclaimed Stephen king and his brother Henry, bishop of Winchester, secured the support of the Church. Hugh Bigod, the royal steward, swore that King Henry had changed his mind on his deathbed and had nominated Stephen instead. Stephen was crowned on 22 December 1135. In February, he marched to Durham and concluded a treaty with David who recognized him as king in return for Carlisle and the confirmation of David's son Henry of Scotland as the earl of Huntingdon.

With Stephen's coronation, Matilda became queen consort. She had arrived in England by Easter 1136 and was crowned in Westminster Abbey on 22 March. At the Easter court, the couple's daughter Matilda was betrothed to Count Waleran IV of Meulan. The queen was pregnant and did not accompany her husband while he marched to pacify the kingdom, probably remaining in or near London; she gave birth to her last child, Mary, in late 1136.

Because no letters from Matilda survive, her religious beliefs and relationship with the Church can be gleaned only from her patronage. She patronised a variety of orders, but favored reformed ones. She was particularly fond of anchorites: in 1136, probably on a visit to Corfe Castle, she visited Wulfric of Haselbury, who chastised her for having been unkind to a local noblewoman and predicted that the queen would find herself scrambling for friends. In March or April 1137–shortly after Stephen suppressed the rebellion of Baldwin de Redvers with the siege of Exeter–Matilda founded her first religious house: she ceded a piece of her land in Essex to the Order of the Temple for the erection of Cressing Temple. This and subsequent grants to the Temple reflected the importance of crusading to Matilda's family identity. A large number of foundations followed, perhaps in emulation of Matilda of Scotland, who was famous for her patronage; Matilda explicitly associated herself with her aunt in one of her grants.

Compared with earlier queens, Matilda enjoyed unusual freedom of action because she could draw on both her own landed power and the authority that came with her marriage to the crowned ruler. She spent much of 1137 in Normandy, but returned to England to take charge in Stephen's stead while he campaigned on the continent. Two of their children–Matilda and Baldwin–died around this time.

=== The Anarchy ===
==== Outbreak of war ====
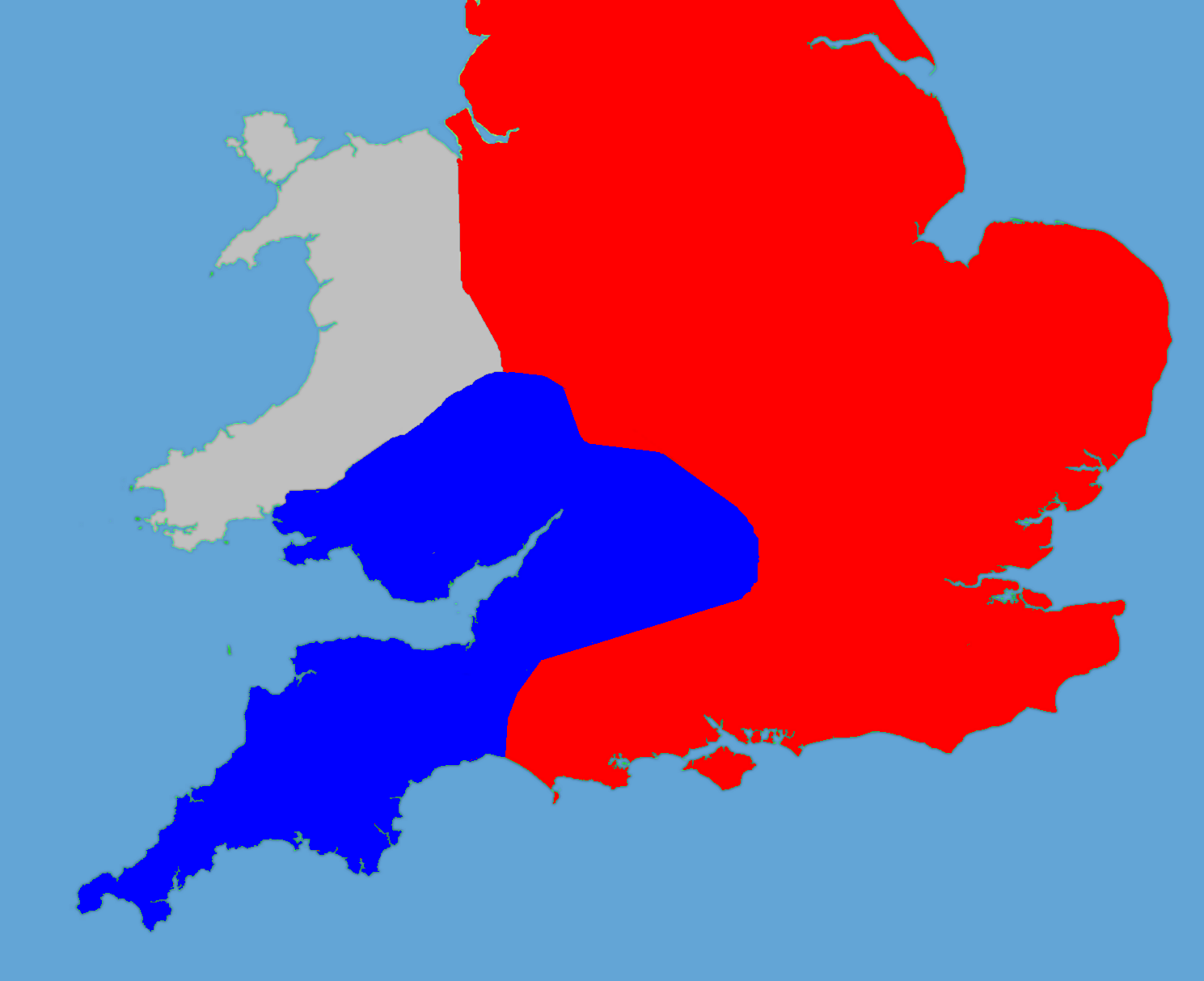
By 1140, England had been split between the supporters of King Stephen (red) and Empress Matilda (blue).

Matilda's active involvement in the political affairs of the realm began in earnest with the outbreak of the Anarchy in 1138. King David of Scotland invaded again, and the defection of Robert of Gloucester to the cause of his half-sister Empress Matilda ignited a massive rebellion against Stephen. The king lost Hereford, Bristol, Leeds Castle in Kent, Castle Cary, Dudley, Dunster, Wareham, Malton, Dover, and Shrewsbury. Matilda and Stephen set about recovering the lost castles. In mid-1138 the queen laid siege to Dover with a large army on land and at the same time had her allies, relatives, and followers from Boulogne cut Dover off by sea. The rebel Walkelin Maminot surrendered to Matilda in late August or early September. The papal legate Alberic of Ostia arrived in October, and with him Matilda set about brokering peace between her husband and her Scottish uncle. Stephen at first spurned them both, but Matilda persisted; she oversaw the signing of the Treaty of Durham on 9 April 1139.

At some point between October 1138 and September 1139, Matilda founded another Templar preceptory, Temple Cowley in Oxfordshire. This transfer of land may have been calculated to deny control of the property to the imperialist party, while still securing Matilda's leverage and authority in Oxfordshire. Like her other grants to the Temple, this gift was made at a time of unrest and may have served as atonement for her involvement in bloodshed. Between 1139 and 1141, Matilda issued a charter granting land to the Savignac order for the foundation of Coggeshall Abbey, which she established jointly with Stephen and their eldest son, Eustace.

The arrival in England of Empress Matilda on 30 September 1139 sparked fresh rebellion against King Stephen. Queen Matilda took diplomatic initiative with her brothers-in-law Henry and Theobald of Blois and arranged for her son Eustace to marry Constance, sister of King Louis VII of France. Matilda escorted her new daughter-in-law to England. A peace conference was held in Bath in August 1140, with Queen Matilda, Bishop Henry, and Archbishop Theobald of Canterbury representing the king and the earl of Gloucester representing the empress; it failed because Stephen would not agree to the clerics' demand that the Church should set the peace terms. Henry came to resent Stephen's refusal to be guided by him.

==== Imperialist advance ====
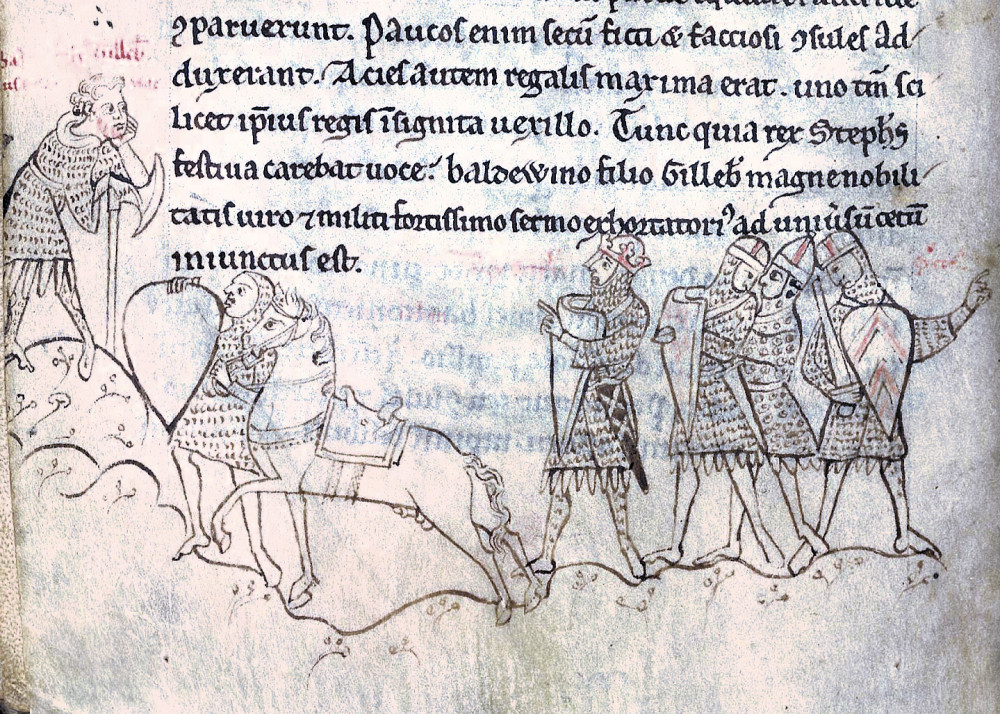
Stephen was captured in the battle of Lincoln, after which Matilda assumed leadership of their faction.

Stephen's settlement of Carlisle on the Scots angered Ranulf, earl of Chester, who had held lands there. Matilda uncovered Ranulf's plot to ambush Henry of Scotland and prevailed on Stephen to intervene on Henry's behalf. Stephen marched north, leaving Matilda and their daughter-in-law Constance in the Tower of London for their protection. The king was captured in the ensuing battle of Lincoln on 2 February 1141 and taken to Bristol into the custody of Robert of Gloucester. The news of his capture reached Matilda within a week. She left for Kent, but Geoffrey de Mandeville, earl of Essex and commander of the Tower, did not allow her to take Constance with her; the historian Catherine Hanley presumes that he wished to keep Constance as a bargaining chip. Matilda was indignant but could not prevent this.

Stephen's capture put both him and Empress Matilda in an anomalous position: he was the anointed king, but could not rule; and her rule could not be legitimized as long as the anointed king lived. Queen Matilda suggested that her husband abdicate and leave England to become either a monk or a crusader in Palestine; in either case, she would have accompanied him. The empress rejected any suggestion of Stephen's abdication and intended to keep him imprisoned for life. Basing herself in Kent, Queen Matilda became the leader of the opposition to her cousin. Count Waleran of Meulan, William de Warenne, earl of Surrey, and Simon de Senlis, earl of Northampton, were among the magnates who swore loyalty to her and the king's cause.

The bishop of Winchester, Stephen's brother Henry, called a council on 3 March 1141 and convinced the clergy to accept Empress Matilda as their lady. A delegation from London, led by the supporters of the empress but also containing royalist men, arrived on the last day of the council in early April. A clerk read a letter from the queen imploring the clergy to restore Stephen to the throne, and the Londoners left the council without recognizing the empress's claim. While the empress advanced towards London, the queen rallied her husband's supporters. Her rump government was aided by her friends and kin, including William of Ypres and Faramus of Boulogne.

Geoffrey de Mandeville, Aubrey de Vere, and Hugh Bigod–southern lords whose ambitions were threatened by the queen's honourial lands–switched their allegiance to the empress. Empress Matilda then received a second delegation from London, who decided to admit her into the city, while the queen continued to gather an army in Kent. At this point, chroniclers praise the conduct of both women, but the empress's demeanor and decisions after she began ruling from London drew sharp criticism from contemporary writers; she acted arbitrarily and harshly, disregarded counsel, and alienated her allies. She also appears to have begun the process of dispossessing the queen of her patrimonial lands, promising them to her military retainers. Both the queen and her brother-in-law the bishop of Winchester pleaded that Eustace be allowed to inherit the land she and Stephen had held before Stephen's coronation, but the empress brusquely refused.

==== Royalist resurgence ====
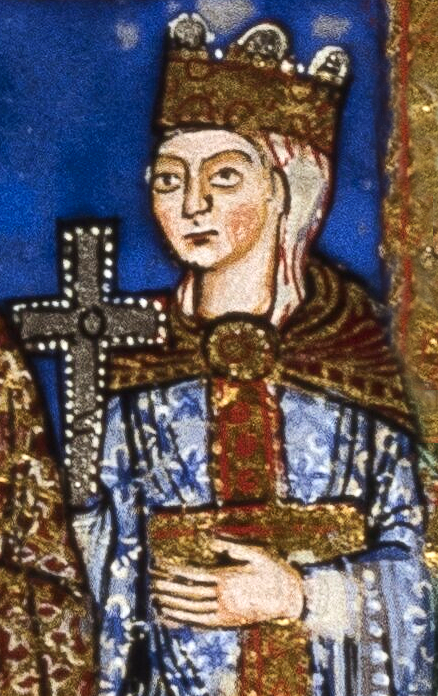
Empress Matilda waged a war for the English throne against her cousins King Stephen and Queen Matilda.

Taking advantage of her rival's failings, Matilda decided to obtain by force what she could not by supplication. She took her army to London and adopted what Hanley describes as the stick and carrot approach: she ordered that the lands of the Londoners be burned and ravaged while also offering to open to them the trade routes she controlled as countess of Boulogne. Realizing that their best option was to side with the queen, the citizens sent representatives and agreed to assist her. On 24 June 1141, the day before the empress was to stage her royal entry into the city ahead of her planned coronation, the citizens rang bells, attacked the imperial party, and opened the gates for the queen's troops. Empress Matilda had to flee in an instant, leaving her dinner still warm; she barely escaped to Oxford with King David and Earl Robert, while Bishop Henry made for Winchester.

The momentum gained by capturing London allowed Matilda to attract supporters. She made peace with Geoffrey de Mandeville, securing the Tower; and she took the opportunity to exhort her brother-in-law Bishop Henry and the lords across England to return her husband to her. Ranulf, earl of Chester, made overtures to the queen, but she distrusted him; he then found that the empress did not want him either. The queen pleaded with Bishop Henry, and he declared once more for Stephen. Around the end of July 1141, Empress Matilda advanced with her army towards the bishop's Wolvesey Castle in Winchester. Henry sent to Queen Matilda for help and fled the palace. She and William of Ypres arrived with an impressive force and besieged the empress's army in Winchester as they in turn held Wolvesey Castle under siege. Cut off from supplies, the empress and her men tried to retreat, but were routed on 14 September and the earl of Gloucester was captured. He was first brought before the queen and then taken to Rochester in Kent.

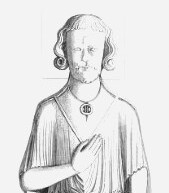
Queen Matilda was able to secure her husband's release after capturing Earl Robert, chief partisan of Empress Matilda.

Empress Matilda struggled after losing Robert of Gloucester, her chief commander. Queen Matilda treated her prisoner with courtesy. In an attempt to induce him to switch sides, she offered him a place in her husband's government. When he refused, she threatened him with imprisonment for life in Boulogne, but he did not think this likely; his wife, Countess Mabel, had custody of King Stephen. Finally, the queen started negotiating with Mabel about exchanging Robert for Stephen. The women were making progress when Robert objected to the exchange, insisting that a king was too exalted to be exchanged for one mere earl; but the queen's men objected to releasing their own captives alongside Robert. Robert then declared that the exchange could only take place with the consent of his half-sister Empress Matilda. After she gave her permission, Stephen and Robert were released; but neither side trusted each other by this point, and so Stephen's wife, one of their sons and two lords took his place in Bristol while Robert and Mabel's son William took his father's place in Rochester. After the earl reached Bristol, the queen and the other hostages were released; and when they reached Westminster, Robert's son was released as well.

==== Stalemate ====
After Stephen's release and return to politics, Matilda stepped back into the role of consort, peacemaker and mother. She took part in the recrowning of her husband, wearing her own crown, on Christmas Day in Canterbury Cathedral. From 1142, Stephen and Matilda held little authority in the Midlands and northern England and none in the west. In June 1142, Matilda travelled to Boulogne and Lens to raise troops, funds, and support. At this time, she became a major patron of Clairmarais Abbey in Flanders; calling herself "Matilda, by the grace of God queen of the English and countess of Boulogne", she gave the monks land to build a new abbey, thus competing in patronage with Count Thierry, brother-in-law of Empress Matilda. She soon decided not to antagonize Thierry, lest he decide to aid her enemies. By 1144, Empress Matilda's husband, Count Geoffrey V of Anjou, had conquered Normandy. In late 1146, the queen took part in peace negotiations that ultimately failed.

Between 1142 and 1148, while Stephen was campaigning against the empress's supporters, Matilda exercised authority in London and the south-east and carried out routine government business. She probably oversaw royal administration and revenue collection and ensured the continuation of trade with Dover, Wissant, and Calais, which supplied money and mercenaries for Stephen’s war effort. Almost all surviving charters issued by Matilda as queen concern the Honour of Boulogne, which remained distinct from the crown lands despite Stephen's accession. Matilda involved their eldest son, Eustace, in the governance of her lands, possibly to give him practical experience of rule. In early 1147, Eustace was made count of Boulogne, although Matilda continued to issue grants and writs. (Note: Stephen's biographer Edmund King argues that none of the charters in which Eustace is titled count of Boulogne can be reliably dated to Matilda's lifetime and that the source, Gesta Stephani, says only that in 1147 Eustace was raised to comital rank.) While Empress Matilda and her supporters shifted their focus on promoting the rights of her son Henry, King Stephen and Queen Matilda started working to ensure Eustace's succession to the English throne.

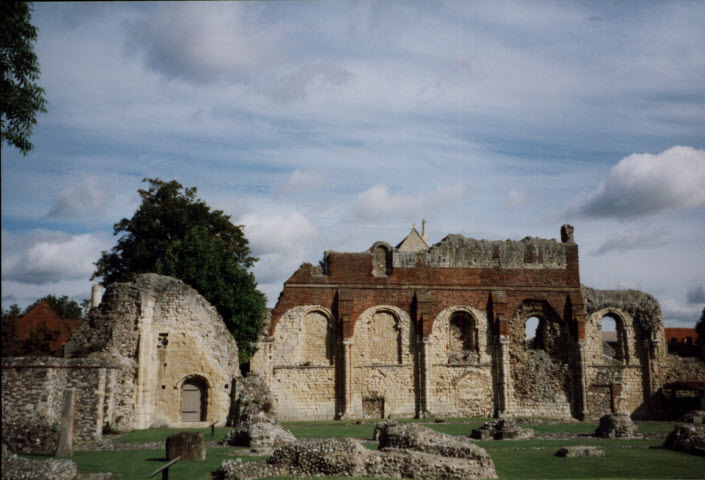
After 1147, Matilda chose to reside within the walls of St Augustine's Abbey, now in ruins.

Robert of Gloucester died in 1147; the following year, Empress Matilda left England for Normandy, preferring to reside in a monastery near Rouen. Conforming to the same ideal of devout queenship, Matilda soon established a residence at St Augustine's Abbey outside the walls of Canterbury. She did not live cloistered, however, and was displeased by the unsociability of the abbey's monks, who took strict vows of silence. She and Stephen maintained a close relationship with the Holy Trinity Priory in Aldgate; their children Matilda and Baldwin were buried there, and the couple made a grant to the house in 1147 or 1148 in memory of their children. She was particularly close to its prior, Ralph, who became her personal confessor. The royal couple's single most favored house was St. Martin's Le Grand, which was both the traditional focus of patronage of Matilda's family and a focal point of 12th-century royal governance.

As queen, Matilda was expected to intercede with her husband, especially on behalf of the Church. Pope Eugene III sought her and Stephen's acceptance of Empress Matilda's appointment of Robert de Sigello as bishop of London. In the 1140s, Stephen clashed with Bernard of Clairvaux over the appointment of the archbishop of York, and Bernard appealed to Matilda. Eugene sided with Bernard and invited Archbishop Theobald to discuss the matter at the Council of Reims in 1148. Theobald went despite Stephen's prohibition; when he returned, Stephen exiled him to France. Matilda called Theobald to stay with her in Saint Omer to facilitate communication and his reconciliation with the king.

==== Succession efforts ====
In 1148, Matilda and Stephen exchanged Lillechurch from her lands in Kent for William of Ypres's manor at Faversham and granted the land to the Cluniac order, founding Faversham Abbey. The abbey equalled Canterbury Cathedral in size and was meant to serve as the royal family's mausoleum. Matilda took a close interest in its construction and endowment. Around the same time, Matilda founded St Katharine's by the Tower, a monastic hospital dependent on the Holy Trinity Priory. At some point between 1148 and 1152, Matilda intervened on behalf of a group of Benedictine nuns from Stratford-by-Bow, who found life there too austere; this group included her youngest child, Mary. For these nuns, Matilda founded her last religious house, a convent in Lillechurch, and Mary became its prioress.

The historian David Crouch dates a charter Matilda gave at Steenvorde, on the border of the counties of Boulogne and Flanders, to 1148 at the earliest; (Note: The historian R. H. C. Davis dates this charter to no later than 1146.) he argues that Matilda accompanied her brother-in-law Henry on a diplomatic mission to King Louis VII of France in 1150. Matilda was at Stephen's side at the church council of 1151. Stephen pressed the Church to crown Eustace king while Stephen lived–a French custom that ensured the succession of the king's son–but the clergy refused.

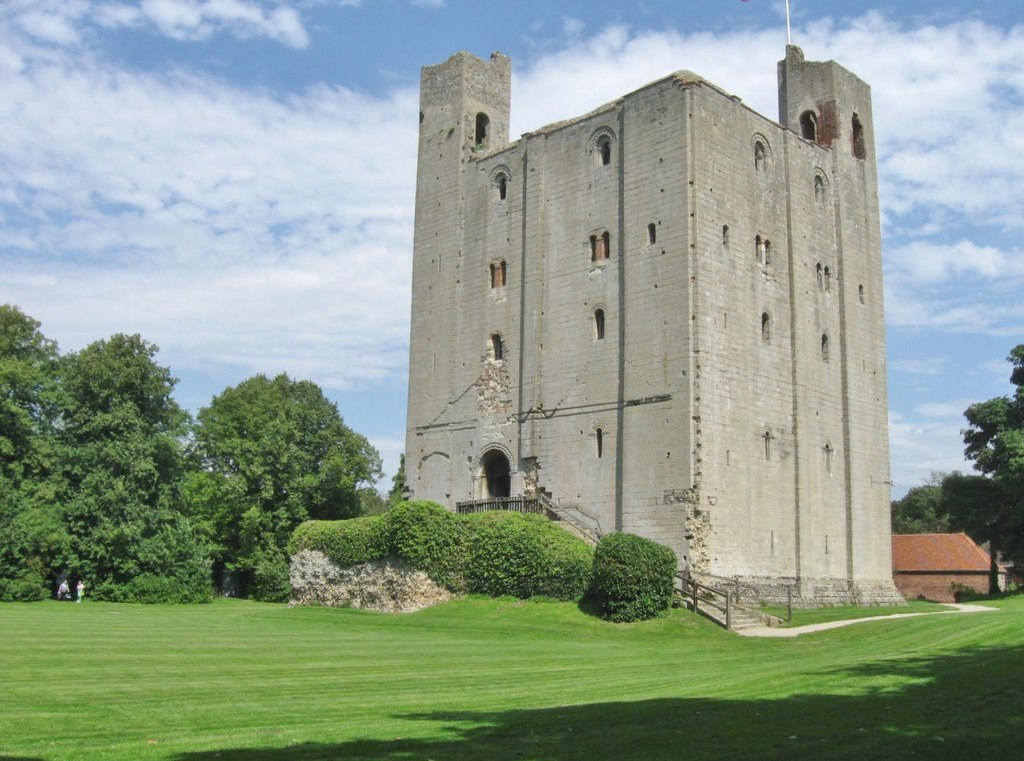
Matilda died at Hedingham Castle while visiting a friend.

In April 1152, Matilda attended Stephen's general council in London, at which Stephen formally declared his wish to be succeeded by Eustace. After the council, Matilda visited her friend and former lady-in-waiting Euphemia, countess of Oxford, at Hedingham Castle in Essex. There she was struck down by a terminal illness around 1 May, and Prior Ralph of the Holy Trinity Priory was summoned to administer the last rites. It is likely that Stephen and Eustace were present when she died on 3 May. She was buried at Faversham Abbey. Her epitaph described her as "happy wife of King Stephen ... distinguished by character and honors ... a true worshiper of God and a supporter of the poor..."

Matilda's death was an emotional and political blow to Stephen. Crouch considers it likely that it was she who had pushed Stephen to fight for Eustace's coronation; the matter was not pursued after her death, and after Eustace's death in 1153, the claim of her younger son William was not considered. It is probably Matilda's death that led Stephen to become closer with his brother Bishop Henry, who advocated for a peaceful resolution to the Anarchy: the succession of Empress Matilda's son Henry II after Stephen's death in 1154.

== Assessment ==
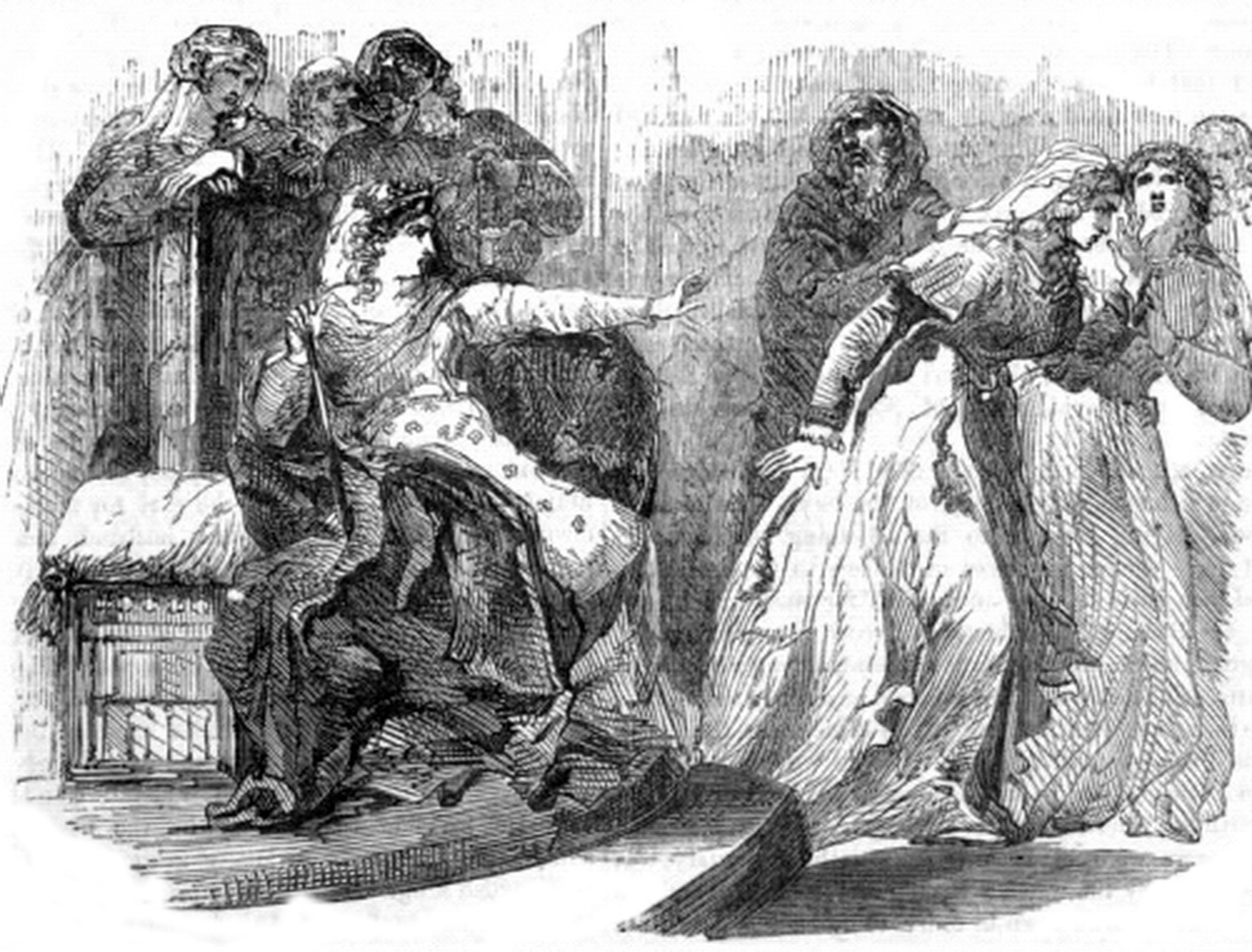
A 19th-century illustration depicts a domineering Empress Matilda rejecting Queen Matilda's meek plea for her husband's release.

King Stephen's biographers attribute his success in retaining the throne to Queen Matilda. R. H. C. Davis believes that it was clear to everyone that Stephen only saw liberty in 1141 "due to her courage and determination"; Crouch writes that he was freed "only because she refused to give up in the face of what looked like defeat". Crouch describes her as "a dauntless and decisive woman" and "a great queen ... a regent, a diplomat and even a war leader for her husband, and ... accomplished in all she did."

While generally biased in favor of either King Stephen or Empress Matilda, none of the principle narrative sources of the Anarchy–William of Malmesbury, Henry of Huntingdon, Robert of Torigni, John of Worcester, Orderic Vitalis, and the author of the Gesta Stephani–disapprove of the actions or character of Queen Matilda. When Henry and Robert framed the crisis of 1141 in moral terms, their criticism was aimed solely at the empress's pride, with the queen passing unremarked.

Patricia Dark and Catherine Hanley, biographers of Queen Matilda and Empress Matilda, respectively, argue that the queen was favorably received by contemporary chroniclers because–in contrast to the empress–she acted in defence of her male relatives and their interests rather than her own claim. To this their colleague Heather Tanner adds Matilda's careful conformity to contemporary ideals of feminine conduct: she sought mercy, offered counsel, accepted advice, and argued her case persuasively. Unlike her cousin, Queen Matilda was thus regarded by contemporaries as exercising good lordship, successfully aligning political action with prevailing gender expectations; she was, in the words of Gesta Stephani, "a woman of subtlety and a man's resolution", who "bore herself with the valour of a man".

== Notes ==
Regnal titles
Preceded by Eustace III	Countess of Boulogne; 1125 – 1152 with Stephen	Succeeded by Eustace IV
English royalty
Preceded by Adeliza of Louvain	Queen consort of England; 22 December 1135 – 3 May 1152	Vacant Title next held by Eleanor of Aquitaine
