= Reginald I of Dammartin =

French count

Reginald I
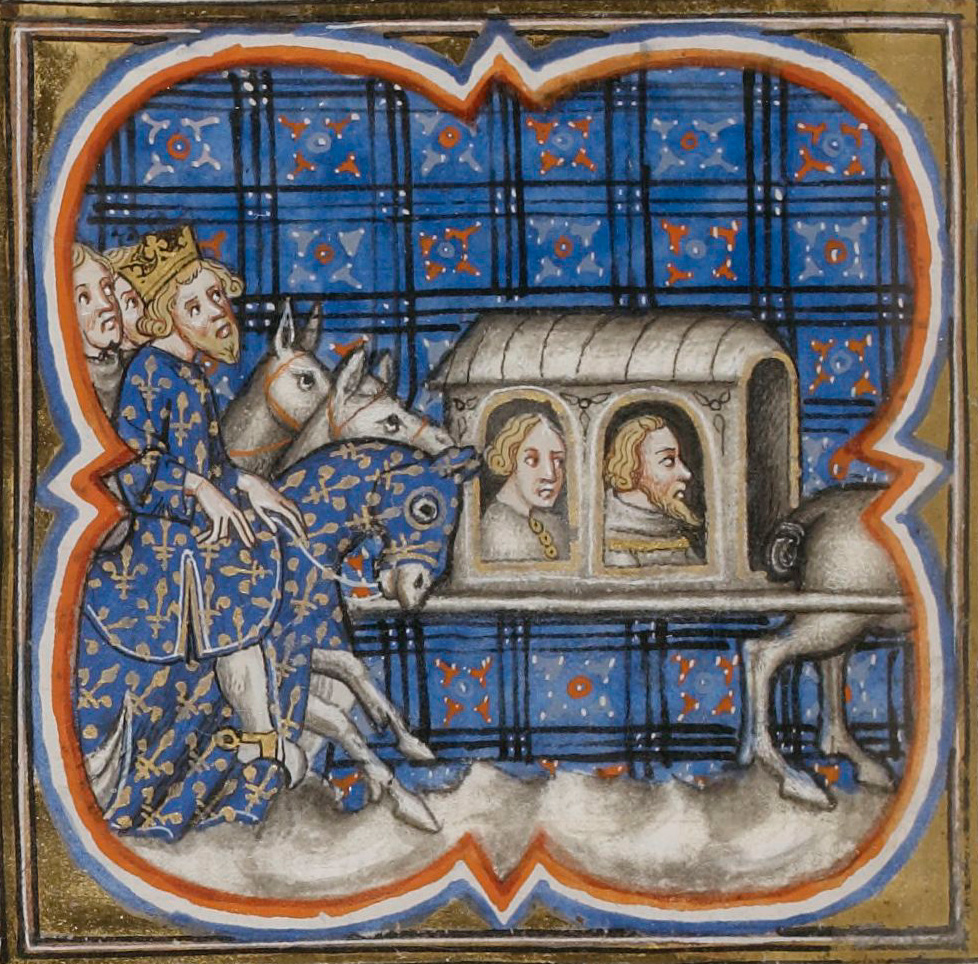
- Born: c. 1165
- Died: 1227 (aged 61–62); Péronne, France
- Noble family: Dammartin
- Spouses: Marie de Châtillon; Ida, Countess of Boulogne
- Issue: Matilda II, Countess of Boulogne
- Father: Alberic III of Dammartin
- Mother: Mathilde of Clermont

Reginald I (French: Renaud; c. 1165 – 1227) was the count of Boulogne from 1190, count of Dammartin from 1200 to 1214 and count of Aumale from 1204 to 1214. He was the eldest son of Alberic III of Dammartin and Matilda of Clermont.

Brought up at the French court, he was a childhood friend of Philip Augustus. At his father's insistence he fought for the Plantagenets. Received back into Philip's favour, he married Marie of Châtillon, daughter of Guy II of Châtillon and Adèle of Dreux, a royal cousin.

In 1191, Reginald's father, Alberic, kidnapped and had Dammartin marry Ida, Countess of Boulogne. The County of Boulogne thereby became vassal to the French king, rather than the count of Flanders. While this marriage made Reginald a power, it also made enemies in the Dreux family and that of the count of Guînes, who had been betrothed to Ida.

In 1203, Reginald and his wife gave a merchant's charter to Boulogne. This was probably made for a financial consideration. Philip made Reginald count of Aumale the following year, but Reginald began to detach himself. Following the acquisition of Normandy in April 1204, King Philip granted Reginald the county of Mortain and the honour of Warenne which was centred on the fortresses of Mortemer and Bellencombre. Both Mortain and Warenne had been held by William I of Boulogne and it would appear that King Philip recognised the Boulogne claim to them.

In 1211, he refused to appear before Philip in a legal matter, a suit with Philippe de Dreux, bishop of Beauvais. Philip II seized his lands and on 4 May 1212 at Lambeth, Dammartin made an agreement with King John who had also lost possessions to Philip. Reginald brought other continental nobles, including the count of Flanders, into a coalition with John against Philip. In return he was given several fiefs in England and an annuity. Each promised not to make a separate peace with France.

With Emperor Otto IV and Count Ferdinand of Flanders, he took part in the attack on France in 1214 culminating in the Battle of Bouvines. Commanding the Brabançons, he was on the losing side, but was one of the last to surrender, and refused submission to Philip Augustus. His lands were taken away, and given to Philip Hurepel. Reginald was kept imprisoned at Péronne for the rest of his life, which ended in suicide. The historian Jim Bradbury has described Reginald's last years:

Renaud languished in prison, and in pitiful conditions. He was chained to a heavy log, which two men had to lift every time he wanted to go to the toilet. Unaided, he could only move half a pace in his chains. His county was granted to Philip's illegitimate son, Philip Hurepel, who saw to it that Renaud would never regain his lands. All those years later, when Ferrand was released, Renaud's hopes of freedom were again dashed. He realized he was to remain in prison for ever.

His daughter Matilda II was married to Philip Hurepel.

== Sources ==
- Baldwin, John W. (2002). Aristocratic Life in Medieval France: The Romances of Jean Renart and Gerbert de Montreuil, 1190-1230. The Johns Hopkins University Press.
- Bradbury, Jim (1996). Philip Augustus: King of France 1180–1223. Florence: Taylor and Francis. ISBN 978-1-315-84582-1.
- Grant, Lindy (2005). Architecture and society in Normandy 1120-1270. Yale University Press.
- Handyside, Philip D. (2015). The Old French William of Tyre. Brill.
