= Matthew of Alsace =

Count of Boulogne

Matthew

Count of Boulogne
- Reign: 1160–1173
- Predecessor: William I
- Successor: Ida
- Born: c. 1137
- Died: 1173 (aged c. 36)
- Noble family: House of Alsace
- Spouses: Marie of Boulogne; Eleanor of Vermandois
- Issue: Ida, Countess of Boulogne; Matilda, Duchess of Brabant
- Father: Thierry, Count of Flanders
- Mother: Sibylla of Anjou

Matthew of Alsace (c. 1137–1173) was the count of Boulogne from 1160. A second son of Count Thierry of Flanders, Matthew was selected by his cousin King Henry II of England to marry Mary of Blois, heiress to Boulogne, Lens, and Mortain as well as vast estates in England. Because Mary was an abbess, the marriage was opposed by the Church and led to Matthew's excommunication. As Henry refused to cede Mortain, Matthew allied with King Louis VII of France against him. He finally separated from Mary in 1170, but continued to rule Boulogne in the name of their daughters, Ida and Matilda. The following year, he married Eleanor of Vermandois. In 1173, he allied with Henry's son Henry the Young King and together with his brother Count Philip I of Flanders invaded Normandy, where he was mortally wounded.

== Illicit marriage ==
Matthew was the second son of Count Thierry of Flanders and Sibylla of Anjou. He was a first cousin of King Henry I of England. Upon the death of Count William I of Boulogne, son of King Stephen, in October 1159, Henry seized William's vast lands in England and Normandy, including the County of Mortain in Normandy. Only the counties of Boulogne and Lens remained unclaimed. Because both William and his older brother, Eustace IV, died childless, their sister Mary, abbess of Romsey, became heir to Boulogne and Lens. King Henry arranged for her to be removed from Romsey and married to Matthew in 1160.

Because Mary was a nun, Matthew's marriage scandalized chroniclers and enraged the Church. Robert of Torigni writes that Matthew "in an unheard of event led away the abbess of Romsey, who was the daughter of King Stephen, and with her seized the County of Boulogne". Late 12th- and early 13th-century writers allege that Matthew abducted Mary from Romsey. According to Matthew Paris, Matthew seduced Mary "by sophistical letters". Matthew's father was not consulted about his marriage and reacted with fury. He and Matthew's older brother, Philip, invaded Boulogne and Lens and seized the latter. Father and son were reconciled by the bishop of Cambrai, Nicholas of Chièvres, in March 1161. Matthew and Mary forfeited Lens to his father and recognized him as overlord of Boulogne. Although they retained Boulogne and held at least a part of the associated honour in England, they had less influence in the region than the previous counts and countesses.

The Church proved more difficult to placate. The archbishop of Reims, Samson of Mauvoisin, excommunicated Matthew. Pope Alexander III was aghast to find out that Matthew had ejected two abbots from Boulogne. In 1162, he learned from Samson's successor, Henry, that "the son of our dear son the noble count of Flanders, had illicitly joined himself with a nun dedicated to God, and an abbess, at his soul's peril". He never accepted Matthew as Mary's husband or count. The archbishop of Canterbury, Thomas Becket, also condemned the marriage and made enemies with Matthew, who reportedly tried to assassinate him as he passed through Boulogne in 1164. Mary and Matthew had two daughters in the early 1160s, Ida and Matilda. Tensions with the local ecclesiastical authorities eventually subsided, and the couple became generous patrons of the Church. Among the recipients of their benefactions were Clairmarais Abbey and the Abbey of Saint Wulmer in Samer.

== Struggles ==
Besides Boulogne, Matthew claimed other lands of Mary's deceased brother William as her inheritance, especially the County of Mortain. Matthew's brother Philip met King Henry in 1166 to negotiate a money fief for Matthew, but failed to obtain it. The next year, Matthew prepared a fleet of 600 ships to attack Henry's coast and joined Philip and King Louis VII of France in attacking Henry's lands in the Vexin. Matthew switched sides in 1168, abandoning his claim to Mortain after Henry offered him a substantial payment. At Henry's request, he attacked Count John I of Ponthieu. At this point, King Louis's sister Constance, widow of Mary's brother Eustace, made a claim to Pope Alexander that Boulogne belonged to her as her dower.

Pope Alexander remained determined to separate Matthew from Mary and drive them from Boulogne. In 1168, he gave Matthew and Mary three months to cede Boulogne to Constance before they would be excommunicated. The same year, Matthew's father died and the County of Flanders passed to Philip. In 1169, Matthew and Mary officially separated. By 1170, they had worked out a compromise with the Church by which Mary returned to monastic life, while Matthew continued to rule Boulogne on behalf of their daughters, who were legitimized. Matthew generously supported Montreuil Abbey, Mary's new home. His authority still derived from her and she remained involved in his rule. Because Philip and his wife, Countess Elizabeth of Vermandois, had no children, Matthew was heir presumptive to Philip. Probably in an effort to solidify the family's hold on the County of Vermandois, Matthew married Elizabeth's sister Eleanor in 1171.

== Death ==
Matthew remained closely allied with Philip throughout his countship. In 1173, King Louis invited the brothers to a council in Paris and convinced them to support the rebellion of Henry II's son Henry the Young King. Matthew was won over by the promise of all of Mary's patrimony, including Mortain and the lucrative honour of Eye. The brothers invaded Normandy. On 25 July 1173, Matthew was wounded by a crossbow at the siege of Driencourt. On his deathbed, he issued a grant to the Abbey of Saint-Josse with the consent of Mary and their daughters; in the charter, dated 8 August, he names Mary his wife. After Matthew's death, the rebellion collapsed.

Matthew was buried at Saint-Josse. His tomb, made of black Belgian marble and relocated to the Museum of Boulogne-sur-Mer, shows him wearing chain mail, surrounded by two dogs.

Preceded by William I	Count of Boulogne; 1160–1173 with Marie	Succeeded by Ida
