= Gerard of Guelders =

Count consort of Boulogne (c. 1149 - 1181)

- Born: c. 1149
- Died: 1181
- Noble family: House of Wassenberg
- Spouse: Ida, Countess of Boulogne
- Father: Henry I, Count of Guelders
- Mother: Agnes of Arnstein

Gerard of Guelders (c. 1149 - 1181) was count consort of Boulogne.

Gerard was the first-born son of the count of Guelders Henry I and Agnes of Arnstein. He was also the older brother of Otto I.

In 1181, Gerard married Ida, Countess of Boulogne, first-born daughter of Matthew of Alsace and Marie I, Countess of Boulogne. Gerard died the same year. Ida then returned to her county, taking everything her deceased husband had gifted her, using force when necessary.

Gerard of Guelders has no known descendants.
