= Counts of Mortain =

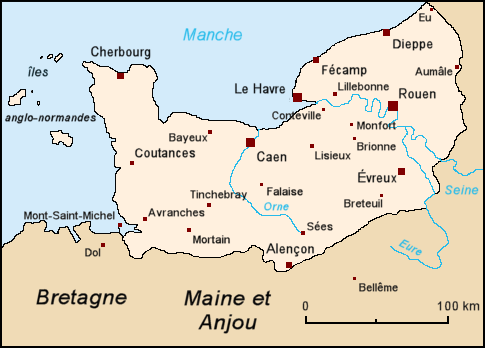
Map of Normandy

The County of Mortain was a medieval county in the Duchy of Normandy in France centered on the town of Mortain, disputed between France and England during parts of the Hundred Years' War. A choice landholding, usually either kept within the family of the duke of Normandy (or the king of France) or granted to a noble in return for service and favor. This was the main reason Mortain had so many counts and from different lineages, as shown below, during its long history.

== Norman counts of Mortain ==
- Mauger of Corbeil (988–1032)
- William "Werlenc" (1032–1048)
- Robert, Count of Mortain (1049–1104)
- William, Count of Mortain (1104–1106)
- Robert II of Vitré (1106–1112)
- Stephen of England (1112–1135)
- Eustace IV of Boulogne (1135–1141)
- Geoffrey of Anjou (1141–1144)
- William of Blois (1154–1159)
- Vacant
- Marie of Boulogne and Matthew of Alsace (1167–1173)
- Vacant
- John [later King of England] (1189–1199)
- Ida, Countess of Boulogne and Renaud de Dammartin (1204–1216)
- Matilda II of Boulogne (1216–1245) and...
  - Philip Hurepel (1216–1233)
  - Afonso III of Portugal (1238–1245)
- Jeanne de Dammartin (1245–1251) and ..
  - Walter of Châtillon (1245–1250)
- Vacant
- Joan II of Navarre (1328–1349)
- Vacant
- Peter d'Évreux (1401–1412)
- Catherine of Alençon (1412–1416) (his widow) and..
  - Louis, Duke of Guyenne (1412–1413)
  - Louis VII of Bavaria, Duke of Bavaria-Ingolstadt (1413–1416)
- Jean Dunois (1416–1417) and..
  - Charles of Le Maine (1416–1417)
  - Charles of Valois, Duke of Berry (1416–1417)

== English counts of Mortain ==
- Edward Holland (1418–1419)
- Thomas Langholme (1419–?)
- John of Lancaster, 1st Duke of Bedford (?–1435)
- Edmund Beaufort, 2nd Duke of Somerset (1435–1449)

== French counts of Mortain ==
- Charles of Le Maine (1449–1472)
- Charles IV, Duke of Anjou (1472–1481)
- Royal Domain
- Louis II, Duke of Montpensier (1529–1582)
- Francis, Duke of Montpensier (1582–1592)
- Henri de Bourbon, duc de Montpensier (1592–1608)
- Marie de Bourbon, duchesse de Montpensier (1608–1627) and..
  - Gaston de France, duc d'Orléans (1626–1660) (her widower)
- Anne Marie Louise d'Orléans, duchesse de Montpensier (1660–1693)
- Philippe de France, duc d'Orléans (1693–1701)
- Philippe II d'Orléans, duc d'Orléans (1701–1723)
- Louis d'Orléáns, duc d'Orléans (1723–1752)
- Louis Philippe I d'Orléans, duc d'Orléans (1752–1785)
- Louis Philippe II d'Orléans, duc d'Orléans (1785–1786)
- Royal Domain
- Henri d'Orléans, comte de Paris, duc de France (1984–2019) (never recognised it as his main title)
