= Treaty of Lambeth (1212) =

1212 treaty between England and French nobles

The Treaty of Lambeth was signed on 4 May 1212 by King John of England and several French counts, including Renaud I of Dammartin and Boulogne and Ferdinand of Flanders. The Treaty of Lambeth of 1212 should not be confused from the Treaty of Lambeth of 1217, also known as the Treaty of Kingston.

By 1212 John had lost his Angevin possessions in France. Renaud lands had also been seized by King Philip II of France. Renaud brought other continental nobles, including Ferdinand, into a coalition against Philip. In return he was given several fiefs in England and an annuity. In the treaty agreed on 4 May 1212, each prince promised not to make a separate peace with France.

== Edition ==
- Rymer's Foedera, I, p. 50.
