= Philip Hurepel =

- jure uxoris Count of Boulogne; Count of Clermont-en-Beauvaisis
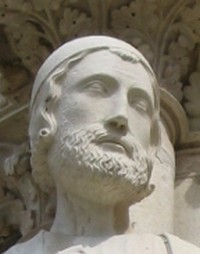
- Statue at Chartres considered to be near contemporary
- Born: September 1200
- Died: 1235 (aged 34–35)
- Spouse: Matilda II, Countess of Boulogne (m. 1223)
- Issue: Joan, Countess of Nevers, Lady de Châtillon-Montjay; Alberic, Count of Clermont
- House: Capet
- Father: Philip II of France
- Mother: Agnes of Merania

Philip Hurepel (1200–1235) was a French prince, count of Clermont-en-Beauvaisis in his own right, and count of Boulogne, Mortain, Aumale, and Dammartin-en-Goële jure uxoris.

Philip was born in September 1200, the son of King Philip II of France and his controversial third wife, Agnes of Merania. Illegitimacy shadowed his birth and career, but he was legitimated by Pope Innocent III. He was associated with founding the Tour du Guet in Calais. He is the first recorded person to bear a differenced version of the arms of France.

== Marriage ==
Philip was married in c. 1223 to Matilda II, Countess of Boulogne. Philip, by right of his wife, became Count of Boulogne, Mortain, Aumale, and Dammartin-en-Goële. He revolted against his sister-in-law Blanche of Castile when his elder half-brother Louis VIII died in 1226. When Philip died in 1235, Matilda continued to reign and was married to Afonso III of Portugal.

Matilda and Philip had:

- Alberic of Boulogne
- Joan of Boulogne, married Gaucher de Châtillon in 1236.

== Sources ==
- Baldwin, John (1991). The Government of Philip Augustus. University of California Press.
- Barber, Malcolm (1992). The Two Cities: Medieval Europe 1050–1320. Routledge.
- Bradbury, Jim (2015). Philip Augustus: King of France 1180-1223. Taylor & Francis.
- Curveiller, Stéphane (2021). Philippe Auguste (in French). Ellipses Editions.
- Neubecker, Ottfried (1976). Le Grand livre de l'héraldique [Heraldry: sources, symbols, and meaning]. Translated by Harmignies, Roger. New York: McGraw-Hill. ISBN 9780070463080.
- Wood, Charles T. (1966). The French Apanages and the Capetian Monarchy: 1224-1328. Harvard University Press.

Philip Hurepel House of Capet Born: 1200 Died: 1235
Preceded by Matilda II as sole ruler	Count of Boulogne, Mortain, Aumale and Dammartin (jure uxoris); 1223–1235 with Matilda II, Countess of Boulogne	Succeeded by Matilda II as sole ruler
