= Matilda of Dammartin =

Queen of Portugal from 1248 to 1253

Matilda

Queen consort of Portugal
- Tenure: 1248–1253

Countess of Boulogne
- Reign: 1216–1259
- Predecessor: Ida
- Successor: Adelaide
- Co-rulers: Philip Hurepel (1223–1235); Afonso (1238–1248)
- Born: 1202
- Died: January 1259 (aged 56–57)
- Burial: Cistercian Abbey of Gomerfontaine (Trie-la-Ville, Oise department)
- Spouses: Philip Hurepel (m. 1223; died 1235) Afonso III of Portugal (m. 1238; div. 1253)
- Issue: Joan, Countess of Clermont; Alberic, Count of Clermont
- House: Dammartin
- Father: Reginald I, Count of Dammartin
- Mother: Ida, Countess of Boulogne

Matilda (1202 – January 1259) was countess of Dammartin and Boulogne in her own right and queen of Portugal by marriage to King Afonso III from 1248 until their divorce in 1253. She was the daughter and successor of Countess Ida of Boulogne and Count Reginald I of Dammartin. She succeeded her mother in 1216 and her father in 1227.

== First marriage ==
In 1223, Matilda married her first husband, Philip Hurepel, count of Clermont-en-Beauvais, a younger, arguably illegitimate son of King Philip II of France. By marriage to her, Philip Hurepel became her co-ruler of Boulogne, Mortain, Aumale and Dammartin-en-Goële.

== Second marriage ==
Count Philip died in 1234, and Matilda reigned independently for three years. To give the county a male head, she married again in 1238 to Infante Afonso, second in line to the Portuguese throne, younger brother of King Sancho II of Portugal. He became King Afonso III of Portugal on 4 January 1248. At that time he renounced Boulogne.

In 1258, Matilda charged Afonso with bigamy, following his marriage to Beatrice of Castile. Pope Alexander in response, imposed interdict upon any place the couple stayed. At the time of Matilda's death, Afonso and Beatrice were still together, despite the pope's protests.

== Later life ==
She had a son and a daughter with Philip, but no surviving issue with Afonso. Matilda's then apparent barrenness was the true reason for their divorce. According to reports, Queen Matilda remained in Boulogne and was not allowed to follow her husband to Portugal.

Matilda's daughter, having married a lord de Châtillon-Montjay, predeceased her, and presumably left no surviving issue.

Her son reportedly renounced his rights and went to England, for unknown reasons. Apparently he survived his mother the Countess, but presumably did not leave issue.

She was probably buried at the Cistercian Abbey of Gomerfontaine (nowadays in the French commune of Trie-la-Ville, in the Oise department).

== Sources ==
- Barber, Malcolm (1992). The Two Cities: Medieval Europe 1050–1320. Routledge.
- Livermore, H.V. (1947). A History of Portugal. Cambridge University Press.
- Wood, Charles T. (1966). The French Apanages and the Capetian Monarchy: 1224-1328. Harvard University Press.
- Toussaint Duplessis, Michel (1740). Description géographique et historique de la haute Normandie, vol. 2. Nyon Père.

Regnal titles
| Preceded by Ida | Countess of Boulogne; 1216 – 1259 with Philip Hurepel (1223-35); Alphonse (1238-48) | Succeeded by Adelaide |
| Preceded by Reginald I | Countess of Dammartin; 1227 – 1259 with Philip Hurepel (1223-35); Alphonse (1238-48) | Succeeded by Matthew of Trie |
Portuguese royalty
| Preceded by Mécia Lopes de Haro | Queen consort of Portugal; 4 January 1248 – 1253 | Succeeded by Beatrice of Castile |
