= Treaty of Lambeth =

1217 peace treaty

The Treaty of Lambeth of 1217, also known as the Treaty of Kingston to distinguish it from the Treaty of Lambeth of 1212, was a peace treaty signed by Louis of France in September 1217 ending the campaign known as the First Barons' War to uphold the claim by Louis to the throne of England. When the campaign had begun, baronial enemies of the unpopular English king John had flocked to the French banner, but after John's death in 1216, and his replacement by a regent, William Marshal, on behalf of John's young son and successor, Henry III, many had switched sides. Subsequent defeats at Lincoln in May 1217 and at Dover and Sandwich in August 1217 forced Louis to negotiate.

Information on the treaties is based on three early documents but none of these is known to have been based on an original manuscript. It is known that negotiations were spread over several locations, opening on 6 September 1217 at Staines, because the royal court was nearby at Chertsey or possibly on 5 September on an island of the Thames near Kingston. Various dates for treaties are given by the sources including:

- a treaty signed by Louis and Henry's regents on 11 September at Lambeth Palace (the archbishop of Canterbury's London house),
- a Treaty of Kingston on 12 September,
- papal ratification from the papal legate, who was encamped near Kingston on the 13 September and who issued his terms on 22 September at Merton.
- a Treaty of Lambeth signed on 20 September ratifying the Kingston treaty.

Whatever documents were actually signed during September, Louis left England for the last time from Dover on 28 September. The principal provisions of the treaties were an amnesty for English rebels. It was also acknowledged that the French had failed to take possession of the entire Channel Islands and so possession of the individual islands was restored to the king of England. Louis undertook not to attack England again and agreed to renounce his claim to the English throne, in exchange for 10,000 marks. Scottish troops under Alexander II also withdrew.

There is no known surviving copy of the treaties.

== Bibliography ==
- James H. Ramsay The Dawn of the Constitution: Or, the Reigns of Henry III and Edward I (A.D. 1216-137) Oxford University Press, 1908
- Maurice Powicke The Thirteenth Century, 1216-1307 (Oxford History of England)" Clarendon Press, 1962
- H. W. C. Davis England under the Normans and Angevins, 1066-1272 Methuen, 1905.
- The Oxford Companion to British History, originally published by Oxford University Press 2002.
