= Jure uxoris =

Title of nobility used by a man because his wife holds it in her own right

Jure uxoris (iure uxoris; a Latin phrase meaning "by right of (his) wife") describes a title of nobility used by a man because his wife holds the office or title suo jure ("in her own right"). Similarly, the husband of an heiress could become the legal possessor of her lands. For example, married women in England and Wales were legally prohibited from owning real estate until the Married Women's Property Act 1882.

== Middle Ages ==
During the feudal era, the husband's control over his wife's real property, including titles, was substantial. On marriage, the husband gained the right to possess his wife's land during the marriage, including any acquired after the marriage. Whilst he did not gain the formal legal title to the lands, he was able to spend the rents and profits of the land and sell his right, even if the wife protested.

The concept of jure uxoris was standard in the Middle Ages even for queens regnant. In the Kingdom of Jerusalem, Fulk V of Anjou, Guy of Lusignan, Conrad of Montferrat, Henry II of Champagne, and Aimery of Lusignan all became kings as a result of marriage. Another famous instance of jure uxoris occurring was the case of Richard Neville, 16th Earl of Warwick, who gained that title via his marriage to Anne Beauchamp, 16th Countess of Warwick, herself a daughter of Richard Beauchamp, 13th Earl of Warwick.

Sigismund of Luxembourg married Queen Mary of Hungary and obtained the crown through her, retaining it after her death in 1395.

A man who held the title jure uxoris could retain it even after the death or divorce of his wife. When the marriage of Marie I of Boulogne and Matthew of Boulogne was annulled in 1170, Marie ceased to be countess, while Matthew I continued to reign until 1173. Likewise, upon the death of Maria, Queen of Sicily in 1401, her widower Martin I of Sicily continued to reign as King until his death in 1409. In some cases, the kingdom could pass to the husband's heirs, even when they were not an issue of the wife in question (e.g. Jogaila, who became king by marrying Jadwiga and passed on the kingdom to his children with Sophia of Halshany).

Kings jure uxoris in the medieval era include:

- Philip I of Navarre, who was married to Joan I of Navarre
- Frederick II, Holy Roman Emperor, who was named King of Jerusalem by virtue of his marriage to Isabella II of Jerusalem
- Louis I of Naples, whose wife was Joanna I of Naples
- Philip III of Navarre, who was married to Joan II of Navarre
- John I of Castile, who was a claimant to the throne of Portugal by virtue of his marriage to Beatrice of Portugal
- Guy of Lusignan, who ruled as King of Jerusalem by right of marriage to Sibylla of Jerusalem
- Władysław II Jagiełło, who ruled as King of Poland by right of his marriage to Jadwiga of Poland

== Renaissance ==
By the time of the Renaissance, laws and customs had changed in some countries: a woman sometimes remained monarch, with only part of her power transferred to her husband. This was usually the case when multiple kingdoms were consolidated, such as when Isabella and Ferdinand shared crowns.

The precedent of jure uxoris complicated the lives of Henry VIII's daughters, both of whom inherited the throne in their own right. The marriage of Mary I to King Philip in 1554 was seen as a political act, as an attempt to bring England and Ireland under the influence of Catholic Spain. Parliament passed the Act for the Marriage of Queen Mary to Philip of Spain specifically to prevent Philip from seizing power on the basis of jure uxoris. As it turned out, the marriage produced no children, and Mary died in 1558, ending Philip's jure uxoris claims in England and Ireland, as envisaged by the Act, and was followed by the accession of Elizabeth I, who never married.

In Navarre, Jeanne d'Albret had married Antoine of Navarre in 1548, and she became queen regnant at her father's death in 1555. Antoine was crowned co-ruler jure uxoris with Jeanne in August.

== Partial transference of power ==
In England and later Great Britain, husbands acted on their wives' behalf in the House of Lords, from which female hereditary peers were barred until the Peerage Act 1963. These offices were exercised jure uxoris.

When Lady Priscilla Bertie inherited the title Baroness Willougby de Eresby in 1780, she also held the position of Lord Great Chamberlain. However, her husband Sir Peter Burrell acted on her behalf in that office instead.

== Conditions ==
In Portugal, a male consort could not become a king jure uxoris until the queen regnant had a child and royal heir. Although Queen Maria II married her second husband in 1836, Ferdinand of Saxe-Coburg-Gotha did not become King Ferdinand II until 1837, when their first child was born. Queen Maria's first husband, Auguste of Beauharnais, never became monarch, because he died before he could father an heir. The queen's child did not have to be born after her accession. For example, Queen Maria I already had children by her husband when she acceded, so he became King Peter III at the moment of his wife's accession.

Currently in Spain, the husband of a peeress in her own right may use his wife's title socially, although he is not technically entitled to it under the law. For example, Jaime de Marichalar was often referred to as the Duke of Lugo during his marriage to Infanta Elena, Duchess of Lugo. After their divorce, he ceased to use the title. His brother-in-law Iñaki Urdangarin was referred to as the Duke of Palma before corruption allegations prompted the King to take action. Since 12 June 2015, he is no longer referred to as the Duke of Palma de Mallorca, following the removal of that title from his wife, Infanta Cristina.

== See also ==
- Jure matris
- King consort
- List of Latin phrases
