= Treaty of Wallingford =

1153 agreement about the succession to the English throne

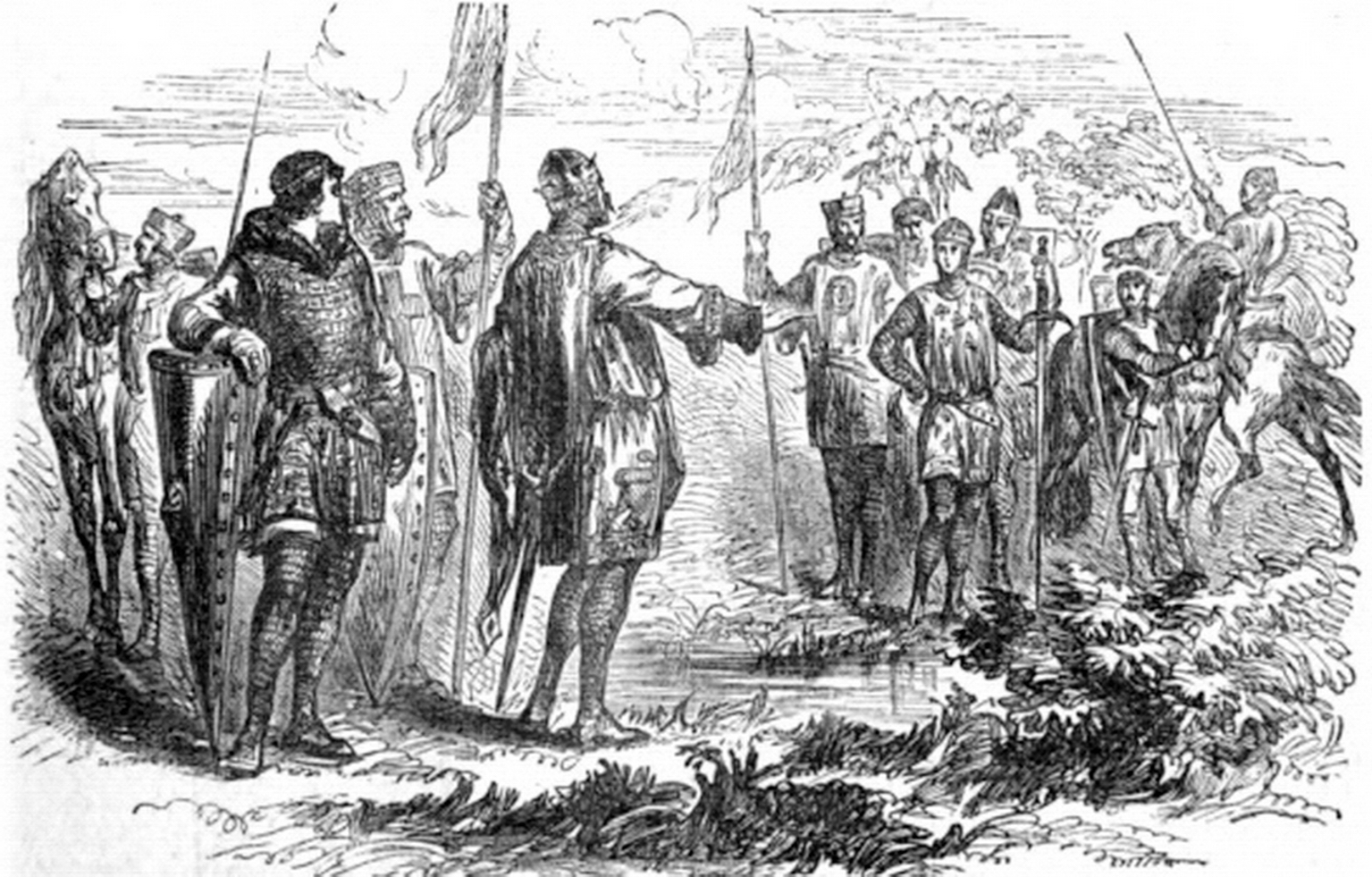
Meeting of Stephen and Prince Henry at Wallingford (Cassell's Illustrated History of England, Volume 1)

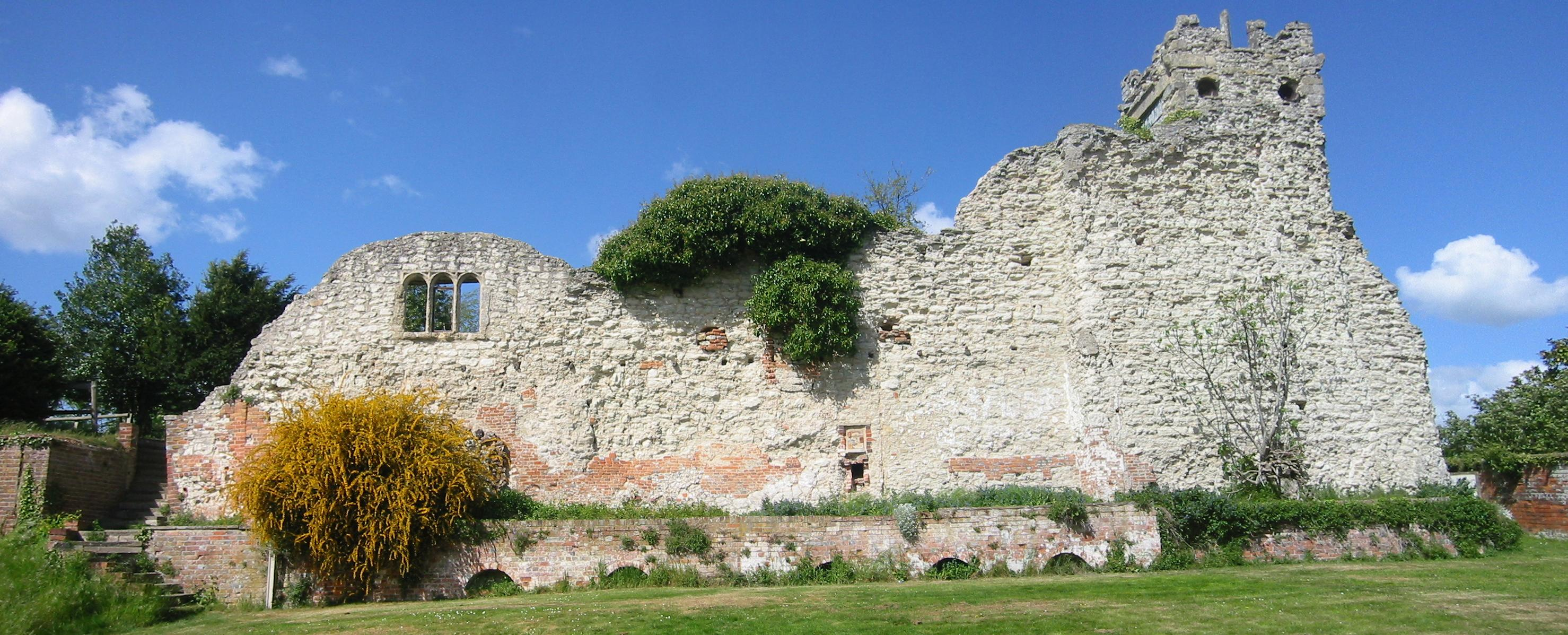
Ruins of Wallingford Castle, where a truce was agreed.

The Treaty of Wallingford, also known as the Treaty of Winchester or the Treaty of Westminster, was an agreement reached in England in the summer of 1153. It effectively ended a civil war known as The Anarchy (1138–1154), caused by a dispute over the English crown between King Stephen and Empress Matilda. The Treaty of Wallingford allowed Stephen to keep the throne until his death (which was to come in October 1154), but ensured that he would be succeeded by Matilda's son Henry II.

== Prelude to the treaty ==
In 1153, the Anarchy had dragged on for nearly 15 years of armed combat, in which neither King Stephen nor Empress Matilda could achieve victory in the struggle for the English throne. This long period was characterised by a breakdown in law and order and allowed rebel barons to acquire ever greater power in northern England and in East Anglia, with widespread devastation in the regions of major fighting. By the early 1150s the barons and the Church mostly wanted a long-term peace.

King Stephen, however, targeted Matilda's supporter Brien FitzCount at Wallingford Castle by building countercastles near Wallingford. Matilda's son Henry Curtmantle launched attacks on those countercastles, and a battle between the forces was expected. However William d'Aubigny, 1st Earl of Arundel successfully argued the futility of further fighting. A temporary truce was reached at Wallingford on the banks of the Thames, but Stephen's son Eustace opposed settling. However, after Eustace's sudden death in August 1153, it appears that a more formal agreement was written at Winchester in November 1153, signed later at Westminster.

Fighting continued after Wallingford, but in a rather half-hearted fashion. Stephen lost the towns of Oxford and Stamford to Henry while the king was diverted fighting Hugh Bigod in the east of England, but Nottingham Castle survived an Angevin attempt to capture it. Meanwhile, Stephen's brother Bishop Henry of Winchester and Archbishop Theobald of Canterbury were for once unified in an effort to broker a permanent peace between the two sides, putting pressure on Stephen to accept a deal. Stephen and Henry Curtmantle's armies met again at Winchester, where the two leaders would ratify the terms of a permanent peace in November.

== Terms of the treaty ==
Stephen announced the Treaty of Winchester in Winchester Cathedral: he recognised Henry Curtmantle as his adopted son and successor, in return for Henry doing homage to him. Other conditions included:

- Stephen promised to listen to Henry's advice, but retained all his royal powers;
- Stephen's remaining son, William, would do homage to Henry and renounce his claim to the throne, in exchange for promises of the security of his lands;
- Key royal castles would be held on Henry's behalf by guarantors, whilst Stephen would have access to Henry's castles;
- The numerous foreign mercenaries would be demobilised and sent home.

Stephen and Henry sealed the treaty with a kiss of peace in the cathedral. Henry II later rewarded Wallingford for its assistance in the struggle by giving the town its royal charter in 1155.

== See also ==
- List of treaties

== Sources ==
- Bradbury, Jim. (1996) Stephen and Matilda: The Civil War of 1139–53. Sutton Publishing. ISBN 0-7509-0612-X.
- King, Edmund. (2010) King Stephen. New Haven, U.S.: Yale University Press. ISBN 978-0-300-11223-8.
