= Ida of Boulogne =

Ida of Boulogne may refer to:

- Ida of Lorraine, Countess of Boulogne (c. 1040 – 1113), daughter of Godfrey III, Duke of Lower Lorraine; wife of Eustace II, Count of Boulogne
- Ida, Countess of Boulogne (c. 1160 – 1216), daughter of Matthew of Alsace and Marie, Countess of Boulogne
- Ida of Boulogne (?), wife of Herman von Malsen and Conon, Count of Montaigu; a postulated daughter of Ida of Lorraine and Eustace II, Count of Boulogne
