= Honour of Lancaster =

Medieval English honour

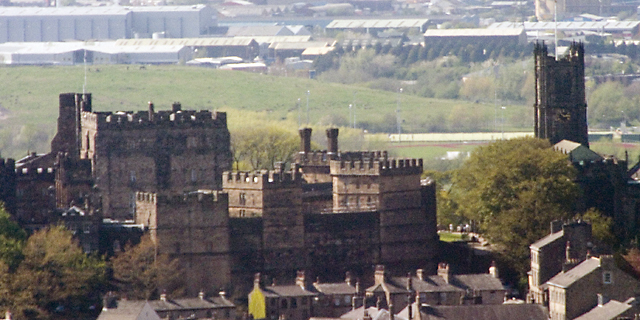
Lancaster Castle, the caput baroniae of the Honour of Lancaster

The Honour of Lancaster was a medieval English honour (a large feudal lordship containing several different fiefs), located primarily in the north-west of England. It began as the fief granted by William the Conqueror to Roger the Poitevin after the Norman conquest in 1066. This included the lands between the River Ribble and the River Mersey, as well as the district of Amounderness, north of the Ribble.

After Roger lost his English lands the honour was given to various members of the royal family and eventually came into the hands of Edmund Crouchback, who was a son of King Henry III. It remained the possession of his heirs until one of them, Henry Bolingbroke, became king of England as Henry IV. Since then the honour has been a possession of the ruling monarch.

== Details ==
Domesday Book, made in 1086, does not say that Roger held Lancaster itself yet, which is listed as part of the manor of Halton. One entry does imply he had a castle somewhere which has been argued to be either Clitheroe or Penwortham. It is thought that he began building Lancaster Castle afterwards. The lands in the north-west of England formed a largely autonomous palatinate, but they were linked to other land holdings as far away as Suffolk, collectively known as the Honour of Lancaster. Roger lost his lands in 1102 when he sided with Robert of Bellême against Henry I and was subsequently exiled, but the Honour remained intact as a distinct collection of estates.

Henry I gave the honour to his nephew Stephen of Blois, who became king after Henry's death. Control of the northern parts of the Honour was disputed during the civil war known as the Anarchy. Henry II took the honour, before it passed to Stephen's son, William, in the late 1150s. William's widow, Isabel, held the honour for a period, before it passed back to the Crown in 1164. In 1189 Richard I granted the honour to his brother John, when the estates were listed as providing a revenue of £200 a year.

By the end of the 12th century, a County of Lancaster was increasingly being referred to in the pipe rolls. It later became common to describe parts of the honour as within or without the Lyme, to substitute the county border.

Since 1194 the honour had been held by the crown, but in 1267 it was given to Edmund Crouchback, founder of the House of Lancaster, the son of Henry III, when he was created the first earl of Lancaster, subsequently becoming part of the Duchy of Lancaster.

== Bibliography ==
- Tait, James (1904), Mediaeval Manchester and the Beginnings of Lancashire, Manchester: Manchester University Press, OCLC 6057079
- Farrer, William; Brownbill, John, eds. (1906), The Victoria History of the County of Lancaster Vol 1, Victoria County History, Constable & Co, OCLC 832215399
