= Trie-la-Ville =

- Commune
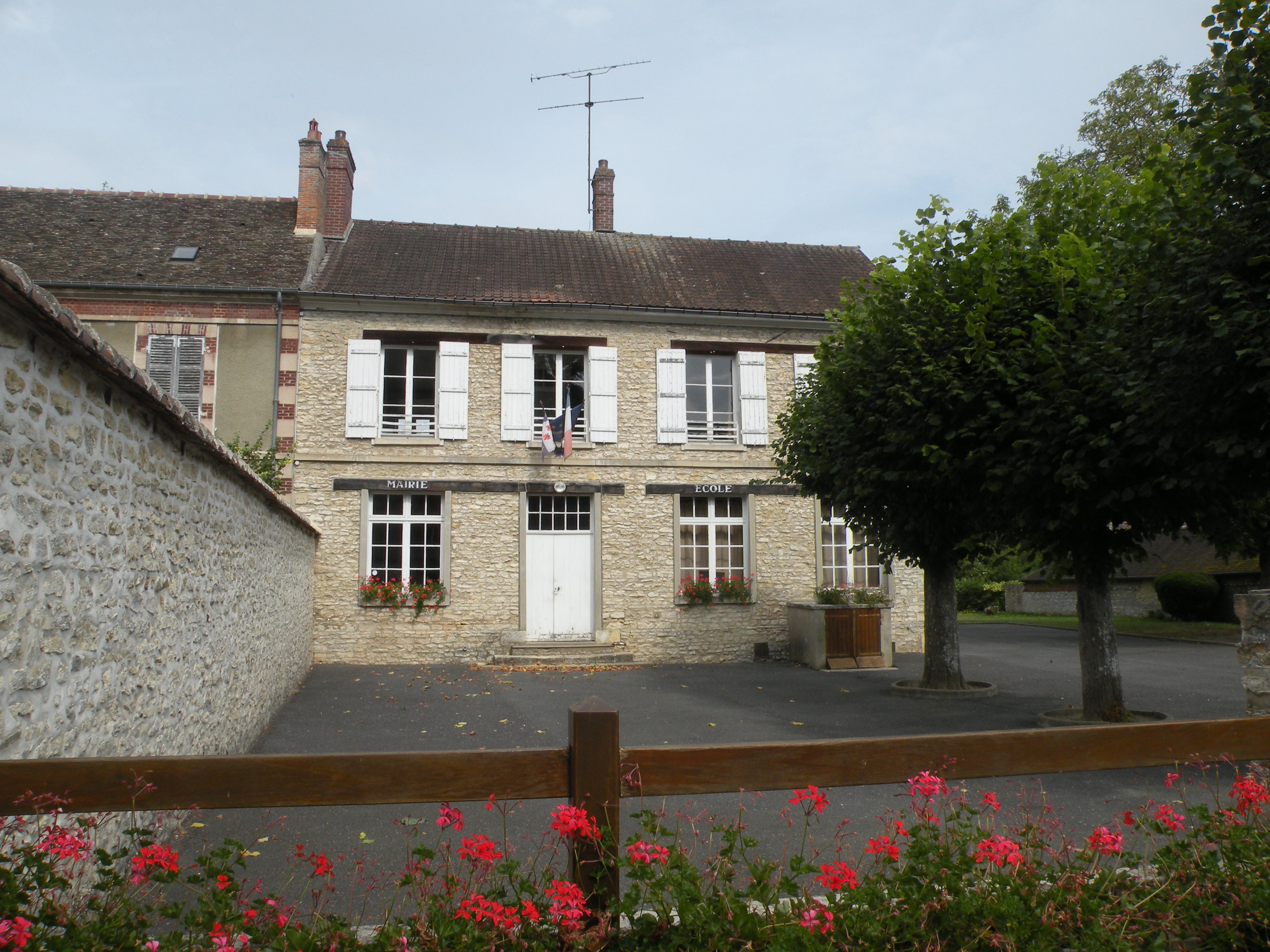
- The town hall in Trie-la-Ville
- Location of Trie-la-Ville
- Location within France Location within Hauts-de-France
- Coordinates: 49°17′26″N 1°50′00″E
- Country: France
- Region: Hauts-de-France
- Department: Oise
- Arrondissement: Beauvais
- Canton: Chaumont-en-Vexin
- Intercommunality: Vexin Thelle

Government
  - Mayor (2020–2026): Claude Vansteelant
- Area^{1}: 4.55 km^{2} (1.76 sq mi)
- Elevation: 72 m (236 ft)
- Highest elevation: 114 m (374 ft)
- Lowest elevation: 56 m (184 ft)
- Population (2023): 303
  - Density: 66.6/km^{2} (172/sq mi)
- Time zone: UTC+01:00 (CET)
  - Summer (DST): UTC+02:00 (CEST)
- INSEE/Postal code: 60645 /60590
- ^{1} French Land Register data, which excludes lakes, ponds, glaciers > 1 km^{2} (0.386 sq mi or 247 acres) and river estuaries.

Trie-la-Ville (French pronunciation: [tʁi la vil]) is a commune in the Oise department in northern France.

== See also ==
- Communes of the Oise department
