= Higham Priory =

Priory in Kent, England

Higham Priory was a priory in Kent, England likely founded in 1148. It was officially dissolved on 28 September 1524.
