= Montreuil Abbey =

Cistercian abbey in France

Coordinates: 49°34′12″N 3°36′8″E

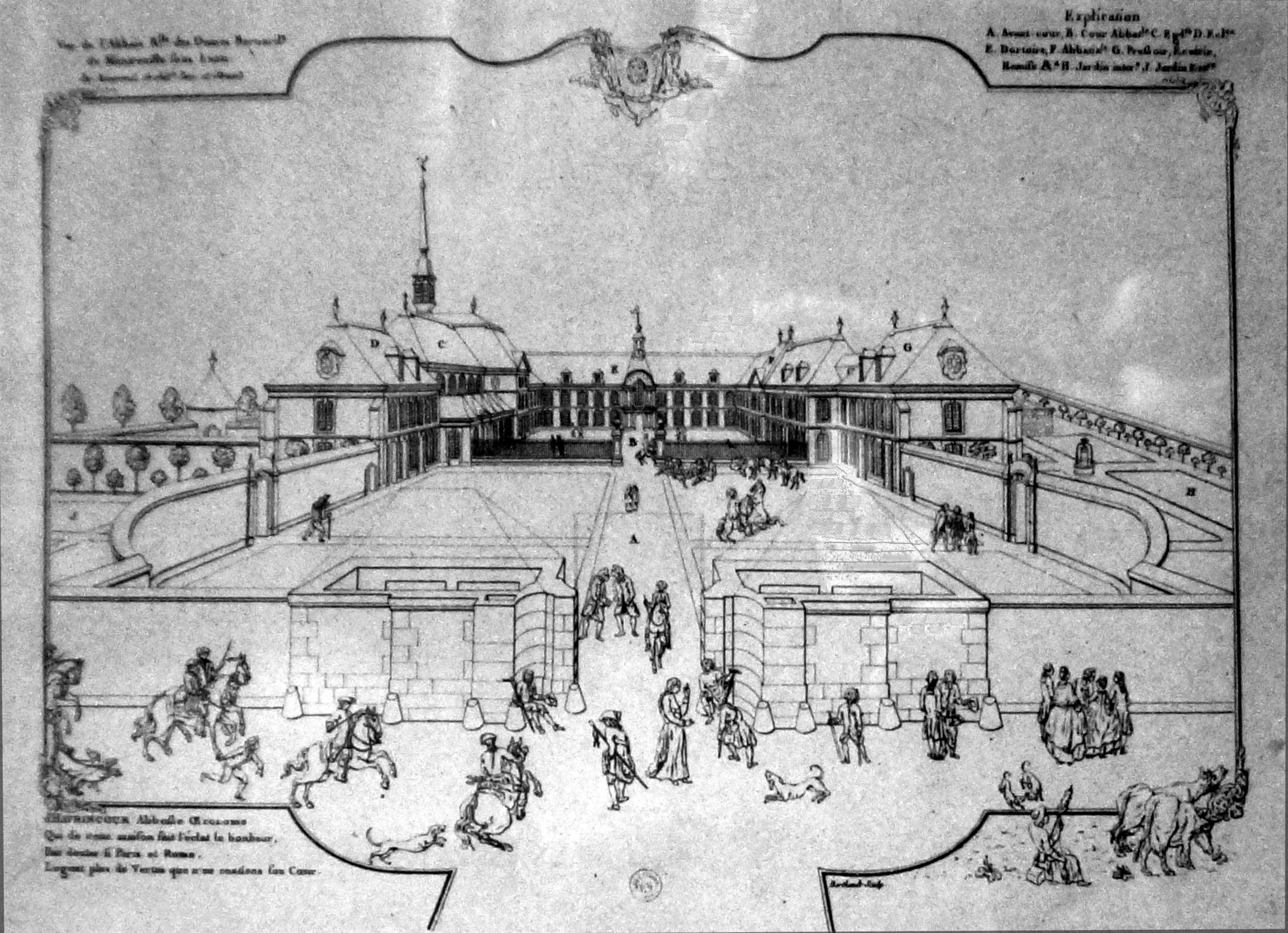
Drawing of Montreuil Abbey (undated)

Montreuil Abbey, or Montreuil-les-Dames, was a Cistercian nunnery in the Diocese of Laon, France, located at first at Montreuil-en-Thiérache (commune of Rocquigny, department of Aisne) until the 17th century and afterwards in Laon, where it was known as Montreuil-sous-Laon.

== History ==
The nunnery was founded by Bartholomew, Bishop of Laon, in 1136. In its early days the community occupied themselves not only in traditional women's tasks such as weaving and embroidery, but also in tilling the fields, clearing the forest, and weeding the soil.

The nunnery rapidly gained a great reputation and within a few years the community numbered nearly three hundred. A community this large was difficult to manage, and within a century of its foundation the abbey was forbidden by the Abbot of Clairvaux to take more novices until the number of nuns at Montreuil was reduced to one hundred, which figure was not in future to be exceeded.

In 1636 the warfare prevalent in the region forced the nuns to abandon the abbey, which was destroyed. In 1655 they were eventually granted as a replacement the former leper hospital of Saint Ladre and Saint Lazare in La Neuville, a suburb of Laon, which became known as Montreuil-sous-Laon

The abbey was suppressed in 1792 at the French Revolution.

The premises were subsequently used as a workhouse, a lunatic asylum, and as a lodging for refugees, and suffered considerable damage and alteration during this period. After a major refurbishment in the early 1990s they are now principally residential in use.

== Holy Face of Montreuil ==
Throughout the Middle Ages Montreuil was a place of pilgrimage on account of its possession of the Sainte Face (i.e. Holy Face) as the Veil of Veronica. This representation of the face of Christ, which was regarded by many as the original relic, was really a copy of the Vera Effigies in St. Peter's Basilica at Rome. It was presented in 1249 to the then Abbess of Montreuil, Sybilla, by her brother Jacques Pantaleon, afterwards Pope Urban IV. The painting, apparently of Eastern origin and already ancient when it came into the hands of the nuns, bore an inscription that seemed undecipherable, baffling even Mabillon. Subsequently, however, some Russian scholars asserted that the words were Slavonic, and read Obraz gospoden na-oubrouse (in Latin, Imago Domini in linteo): "the image of the Lord in a linen cloth". The Sainte Face was not destroyed along with the abbey in the French Revolution, as was once believed, but was instead deposited in 1807 in the treasury of Laon Cathedral, where it remains.

The term Holy Face of Jesus has, however, in recent years been more closely associated with the image obtained via the negative plate of the 1898 photograph taken by Secondo Pia of the Shroud of Turin.

== Sources ==
- Montreuil Abbey - Catholic Encyclopedia article
- Patrimoine de France: Abbaye de Montreuil à Laon (in French)
