= Ida, Countess of Boulogne =

French countess (c. 1160–1216)

Ida
- Countess of Boulogne
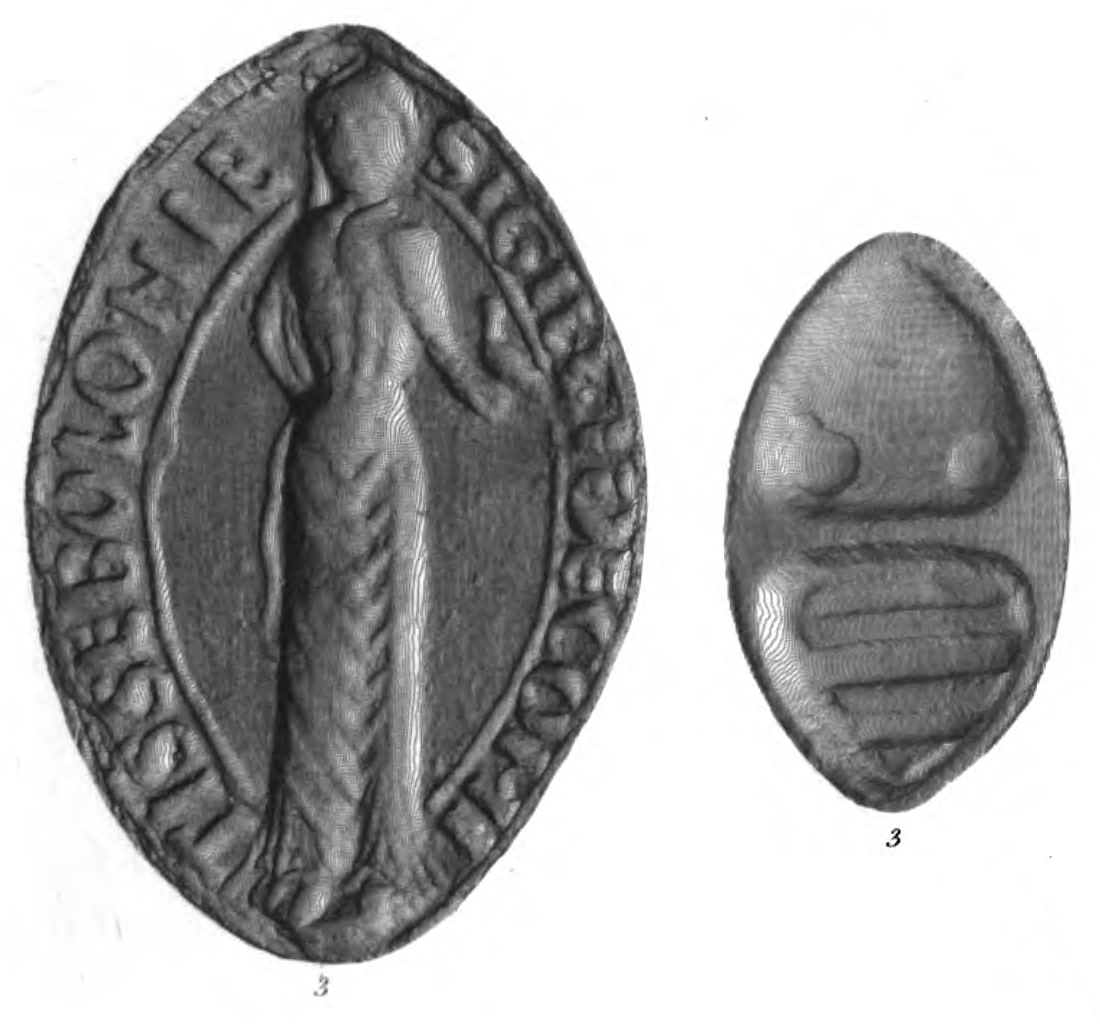
- Effigy on a coin
- Born: c. 1160
- Died: 1216 (aged 55–56)
- Noble family: Alsace
- Spouses: Gerard of Guelders; Berthold IV of Zähringen; Reginald I of Dammartin
- Issue: Matilda of Dammartin
- Father: Matthew of Alsace
- Mother: Marie I of Boulogne

Ida (c. 1160–1216) was, in her own right, the countess of Boulogne from 1173 until her death.

== Life ==
Ida was the elder daughter of Matthew of Alsace and Marie I of Boulogne. Her mother, a nun, had been abducted from a convent and forced into marriage by Matthew. As a consequence, her parents' marriage was controversial and, in 1170, was annulled.

=== Reign ===
Her father continued to rule until his death in 1173, when she succeeded. Upon the advice of her uncle, Philip I, Count of Flanders, she married first in 1181, to Gerard of Guelders, but he died in the same year. She next married Berthold IV, Duke of Zähringen, but he died in 1186.

Ida was abducted in 1190 by Count Reginald I of Dammartin, who carried her off to Lorraine. They had a daughter, Matilda.

== Sources ==
- Luchaire, Achille (1912). Social France at the Time of Philip Augustus. Translated by Krehbiel, Edward Benjamin. Henry Holt & Co.
- Warren, W. L. (1977). Henry II. University of California Press.

Ida, Countess of Boulogne House of Metz Born: c. 1160 Died: 1216
Preceded by Matthew of Alsace	Countess of Boulogne; 1173–1216; Gerard, Berthold, and Renaud	Succeeded by Matilda of Dammartin
