= William I of Boulogne =

Count of Boulogne from 1153 to 1159

William I

Count of Boulogne and Earl of Surrey
- Reign: 17 August 1153 – 11 October 1159
- Predecessor: Eustace IV
- Successor: Marie I
- Born: c. 1137
- Died: 11 October 1159 (aged ~22); Toulouse, France
- Burial: Hospital of Montmorillon, Poitou
- Spouse: Isabel de Warenne, 4th Countess of Surrey
- House: Blois
- Father: Stephen, King of England
- Mother: Matilda I, Countess of Boulogne

William I (c. 1137 – 11 October 1159) (French: Guillaume de Boulogne), also referred to as William of Blois, was Count of Boulogne and Earl of Surrey jure uxoris from 1153 until his death. He was the second son of Stephen, King of England, and Matilda I, Countess of Boulogne.

Arms of William I

William married Isabel de Warenne, 4th Countess of Surrey, in 1148. In 1153, Stephen agreed to pass over William's elder brother Eustace IV of Boulogne as heir to the throne, conceding the succession to Henry Plantagenet, son of his cousin and rival Empress Matilda. Eustace died shortly afterwards and when his father signed the Treaty of Wallingford, William received the lands intended for both brothers, making him immensely rich. The treaty ended the Anarchy, a succession struggle between Stephen and Matilda of which both sides were growing weary.

Stephen died in 1154, and Henry initially allowed William to retain the earldom of Surrey jure uxoris (in right of his wife). However, Gervase of Canterbury asserts a plot against Henry's life was discovered in 1154 among some Flemish mercenaries. The plan was to assassinate Henry in Canterbury, and allegedly William had knowledge of this plot or was in connivance with the mercenaries. Whatever the truth, William fled Canterbury and returned to Normandy.

William had no children. He died in 1159 of disease near Toulouse, and was buried at the Poitevin abbey of Montmorel (French: Abbaye de Montmorel). He was succeeded in his county by his sister Marie I. His widow remarried to Henry's half-brother Hamelin.

== Sources ==
- R. H. C. Davis (1967), King Stephen
- Thomas K. Keefe, "William, earl of Surrey (c. 1135–1159)", Oxford Dictionary of National Biography, 2004
- Van Houts, Elisabeth (2004). "The Warenne View of the Past, 1066-1203". In Gillingham, John (ed.). Anglo-Norman Studies XXVI: Proceedings of the Battle Conference 2003. The Boydell Press.

Preceded by Eustace IV	Count of Boulogne; 1153–1159	Succeeded by Marie I
Vacant Direct ducal rule Title last held by Stephen	Count of Mortain; 1153–1159	Vacant Direct ducal rule Title next held by John
