= Constance of France, Countess of Toulouse =

Countess of Boulogne (1140–1153) and Toulouse (1154–1165)

Constance of France

Countess consort of Boulogne and Toulouse
- Tenure: 1140–1153
- Tenure: 1154–1165
- Born: c. 1126
- Died: c. 1190
- Spouse: Eustace IV, Count of Boulogne (m. 1140; died 1153) Raymond V, Count of Toulouse (m. 1154; div. 1166)
- Issue Detail: Raymond VI, Count of Toulouse; Azalais of Toulouse
- House: Capet
- Father: Louis VI of France
- Mother: Adelaide of Maurienne

Constance of France (c. 1126 – c. 1190) was a French princess of the House of Capet, the only daughter of Louis VI of France and his wife Adelaide of Maurienne. Amongst her siblings was Louis VII, who succeeded their father in 1137.

== Life ==
In 1140, Constance married Eustace IV, Count of Boulogne, son of Stephen, King of England. The couple were married for thirteen years until Eustace's death. They had no children.

The following year, Constance was married to Raymond V, Count of Toulouse. The marriage was arranged by her brother, who was in need of allies against Henry II of England, particularly after the latter bolstered his presence in France by marrying Louis's former wife, Eleanor, Duchess of Aquitaine.

The marriage was an unhappy one, a factor that can explain the tense relationship between Raymond and Louis. After a decade of marriage, Raymond broke from Louis and moved towards a partnership with Frederick Barbarossa. Constance wrote to Louis, complaining that she was isolated in Toulouse; the courtiers ignored her and her servants did not obey her orders. In addition, Constance was displeased by her husband taking mistresses. In 1165, she fled from Toulouse and returned to Paris.

In 1166, with the support of Antipope Paschal III and Frederick, Raymond repudiated Constance. Having lost the favour of Louis, Raymond was forced to perform homage to Henry for Toulouse at Limoges in 1173.

== Issue ==
Raymond and Constance had four children together, they were:

1. Raymond VI, who succeeded his father
2. William Taillefer
3. Adelais or Azalais
4. Baldwin of Toulouse, born 1165, executed on the orders of Raymond VI in 1214

== Sources ==
- Bom, M. M., Constance of France. Womanhood and Agency in Twelfth-Century Europe (Palgrave MacMillan, 2022)
- Cheyette, F. L., Ermengard of Narbonne and the World of the Troubadours (Cornell University Press, 2001)
- Costen, M. D., The Cathars and the Albigensian Crusade (Manchester University Press, 1997)
- James, G. P. R., A History of the Life of Richard Cœur-de-Lion, King of England, Volume 1 (Saunders and Otley, 1841)
- Reddy, W. M., The Making of Romantic Love: Longing and Sexuality in Europe, South Asia, and Japan, 900-1200 CE (University of Chicago Press, 2012)
- Seward, D., Eleanor of Aquitaine: The Mother Queen of the Middle Ages (Pegasus Books, 2014)
- Taylor, C., Heresy in Medieval France: Dualism in Aquitaine and the Agenais, 1000-1249 (Boydell & Brewer, 2005)
