= Eustace IV of Boulogne =

Heir apparent of King Stephen of England (died 1153)

Eustace IV
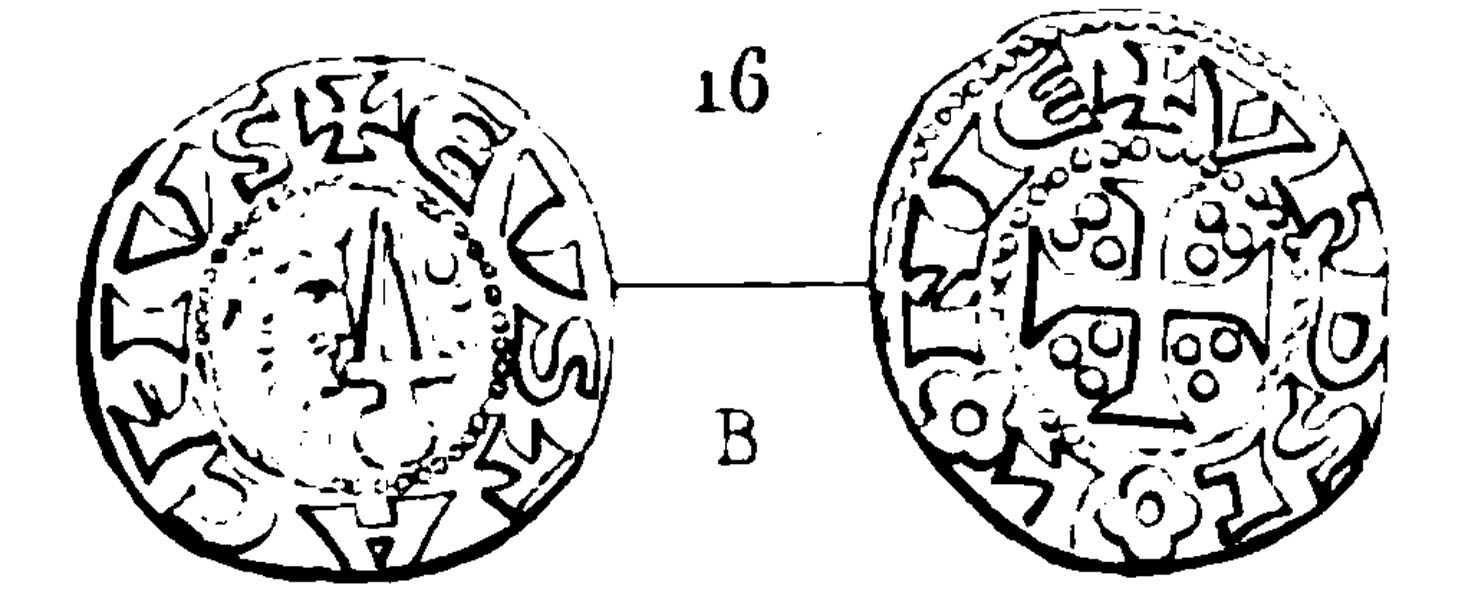
- Piece of coinage with Eustace IV's effigy

Count of Boulogne
- Reign: 25 December 1146 – 17 August 1153
- Predecessors: Matilda I and Stephen
- Successor: William I
- Born: c. 1130
- Died: 17 August 1153 (aged c. 23); Bury St Edmunds, Suffolk
- Burial: Faversham Abbey, Kent
- Spouse: Constance of France (m. 1140)
- House: Blois
- Father: Stephen, King of England
- Mother: Matilda I, Countess of Boulogne

Eustace IV (c. 1129/1131 – 17 August 1153) ruled the County of Boulogne from 1146 until his death. He was the eldest son of King Stephen of England and Countess Matilda I of Boulogne. When his father seized the English throne on Henry I's death in 1135, he became heir apparent to the English throne but predeceased his father.

== Early life ==
Eustace was first mentioned in one of his parents' charters dated no later than August 1131. Stephen ascended the English throne upon the death of his uncle King Henry I, but Henry's daughter Empress Matilda claimed the throne as well, leading to the long civil war known as the Anarchy. As heir apparent to the English throne in 1137, Eustace did homage for Normandy to King Louis VII of France; he was married to Louis's sister Constance in 1140 when she was 16 and he was about 10 or 12. Eustace was knighted in 1147, at which date he was probably from sixteen to eighteen years of age.

== The Anarchy ==
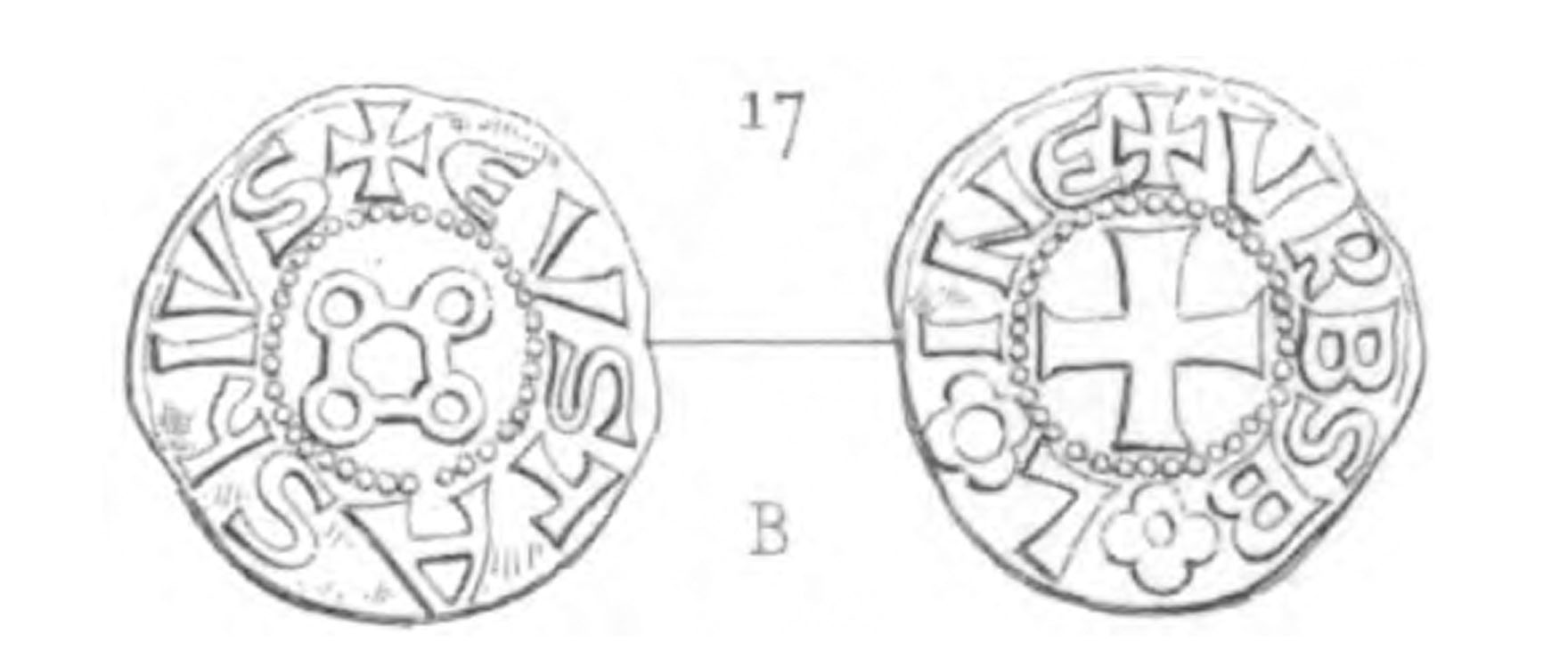
Coins of Eustace IV

In 1151, Eustace joined his brother-in-law, Louis VII, in a raid upon Normandy, also contested between Empress Matilda and King Stephen. This was short-lived, however, when Louis accepted the homage of Henry Plantagenet, son of Empress Matilda, for Normandy. The following year, Eustace was in France as part of a wider coalition of Henry's enemies, but Henry's control of the duchy remained unshaken.

In the later stages of the Anarchy, Stephen was concerned with cementing Eustace as his heir without question. At a council held in London on 6 April 1152, Stephen induced a small number of barons to pay homage to Eustace as their future king; but the archbishop of Canterbury, Theobald of Bec, and the other bishops declined to perform the coronation ceremony on the grounds that the Roman curia had declined Stephen's request to use the French custom and crown Eustace in his own lifetime, opting rather they stick to English custom, thus denying Eustace his coronation. This infuriated Stephen and Eustace to such a degree that, as recorded by Henry of Huntingdon, they had the prelates confined and attempted by means of 'strong coercion' to force their acquiescence. Theobald himself was said to have escaped across the Thames and eventually into temporary exile in Flanders. While Edmund King casts doubts on this particular account he does not doubt the King's rage.

This clearly had not been Stephen's first attempt at crowning Eustace as John of Salisbury reports that Celestine II had written to Archbishop Theobald as early as 1143 forbidding him 'to allow any change to be made in the English kingdom in the matter of the crown', a policy that was maintained by Celestine's immediate successors. Eustace's mother died on 3 May 1152.

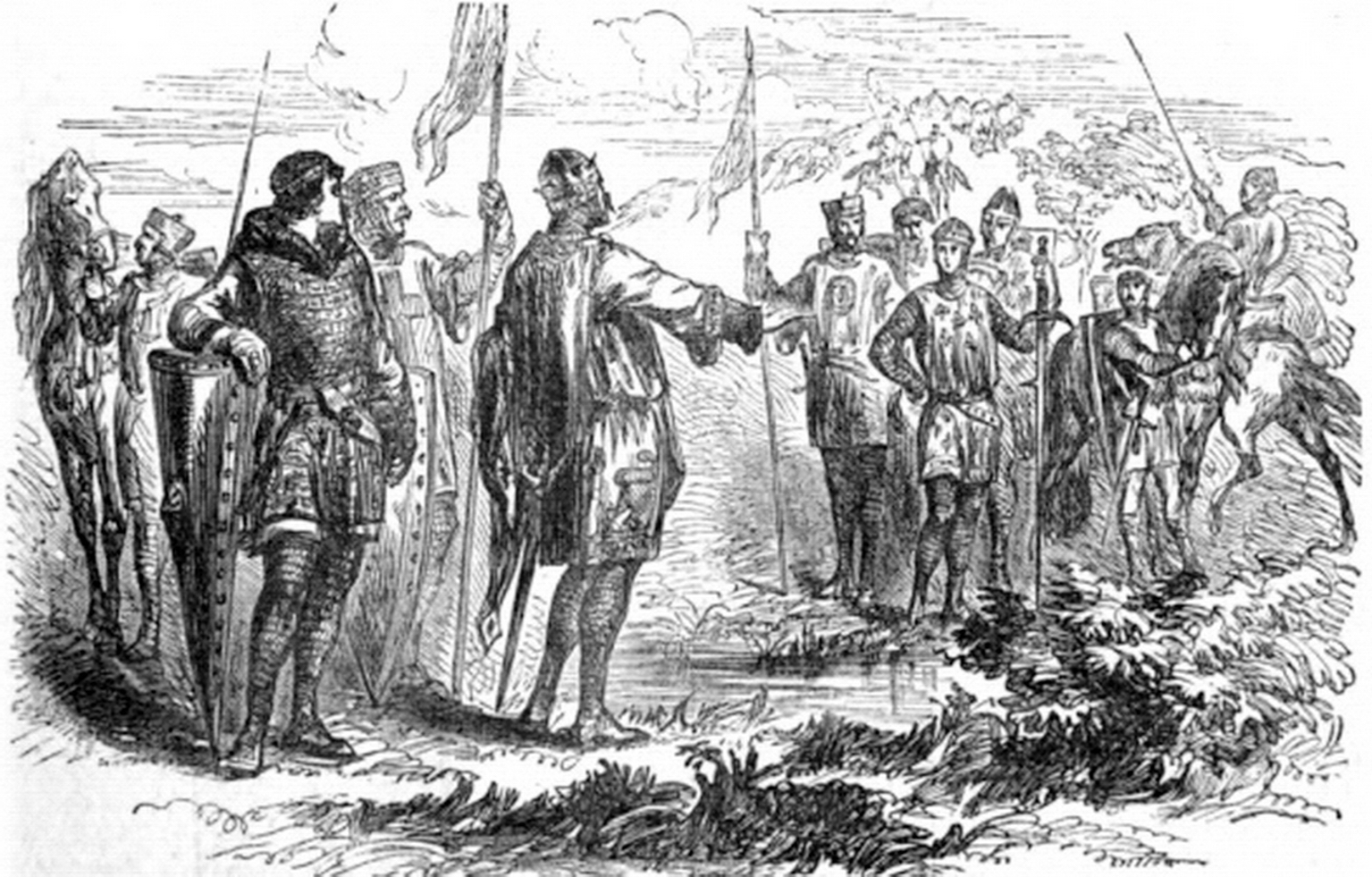
Meeting of Stephen and Prince Henry at Wallingford (Cassell's Illustrated History of England, 1865), depicting the Treaty of Wallingford, 1153. Eustace, then in his early 20s, is standing at left, his arm resting on his shield, his father next to him. Opposite them is the 20-year-old Henry FitzEmpress.

After the second siege of Wallingford in July 1153, after Henry had invaded England and attracted widespread support, Stephen was persuaded to agree to terms. The agreement, known as the Treaty of Wallingford, established Henry as Stephen's heir. Eustace withdrew from the court as a result of this, "greatly vexed and angry, because the war, in his opinion, had not reached a proper conclusion".

== Death and aftermath ==
Eustace died suddenly that same year, in mid-August 1153, struck down (so it was said) by the wrath of God while plundering church lands near Bury St Edmunds. The death of Eustace was hailed with general satisfaction as opening the possibility of a peaceful settlement between Stephen and his rival, the young Henry Plantagenet. According to William of Newburgh, Stephen was "grieved beyond measure by the death of the son whom he hoped would succeed him; he pursued warlike preparations less vigorously, and listened more patiently than usual to the voices of those urging peace."

The reputation Eustace left behind was mixed. On the one hand, the Peterborough Chronicle, not content with voicing this sentiment, gives Eustace a bad character. "He was an evil man and did more harm than good wherever he went; he spoiled the lands and laid thereon heavy taxes." Eustace raided church lands near Peterborough, possibly inciting this hatred from the Chronicle. He had used threats against the recalcitrant bishops, and in the war against the Angevin party had demanded contributions from religious houses. However, the Gesta Stephani describes his courtly manner as a true heir to Stephen able to "meet men on a footing of equality or superiority as the occasion acquired".

Eustace was buried in Faversham Abbey in Kent, which was founded by his parents. They too were buried in Faversham Abbey; all three tombs are now lost, as a consequence of the Dissolution of the Monasteries.

Eustace IV of Boulogne House of Blois Born: ? c. 1130 Died: 17 August 1153
Regnal titles
Preceded by Matilda I Stephen	Count of Boulogne; 1146–1153	Succeeded by William I
