= Stephen, King of England =

King of England from 1135 to 1154

Stephen
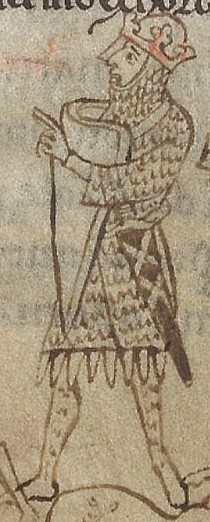
- Stephen in a 12th-century manuscript depicting the Battle of Lincoln

King of England
- Reign: 22 December 1135 – 25 October 1154
- Coronations: 22 December 1135; 25 December 1141
- Predecessor: Henry I
- Successor: Henry II
- Contenders: Matilda (1141–1148); Henry FitzEmpress (1148–1153)
- Born: Stephen of Blois; 1092 or 1096; Blois, France
- Died: 25 October 1154 (aged 57–58 or 61–62); Dover, Kent, England
- Burial: Faversham Abbey, Kent, England
- Spouse: Matilda I, Countess of Boulogne (m. 1125; died 1152)
- Issue more...: Eustace IV, Count of Boulogne; Marie I, Countess of Boulogne; William I, Count of Boulogne; Gervase, Abbot of Westminster (ill.)
- House: Blois
- Father: Stephen, Count of Blois
- Mother: Adela of Normandy

Stephen (1092 or 1096 – 25 October 1154), often referred to as Stephen of Blois, was King of England from 22 December 1135 to his death in 1154. He was Count of Boulogne jure uxoris from 1125 until 1147 and Duke of Normandy from 1135 until 1144. His reign was marked by the Anarchy, a civil war with his cousin and rival, the Empress Matilda, whose son, Henry II, succeeded Stephen as the first of the Angevin kings of England.

Stephen was born in the County of Blois in central France as the fourth son of Stephen-Henry, Count of Blois, and Adela, daughter of William the Conqueror. His father died as a crusader while Stephen was still young, and he was brought up by his mother. Placed into the court of his uncle Henry I of England, Stephen rose in prominence and was granted extensive lands. He married Matilda of Boulogne, inheriting additional estates in Kent and Boulogne that made the couple one of the wealthiest in England. Stephen narrowly escaped drowning with Henry I's son, William Adelin, in the sinking of the White Ship in 1120; William's death left the succession of the English throne open to challenge. When Henry died in 1135, Stephen quickly crossed the English Channel and took the throne with the help of his brother Henry, Bishop of Winchester, arguing that the preservation of order across the kingdom took priority over his earlier oaths to support the claim of Henry I's daughter, the Empress Matilda.

The early years of Stephen's reign were largely successful, despite a series of attacks on his possessions in England and Normandy by David I of Scotland, Welsh rebels, and the Empress Matilda's husband Geoffrey Plantagenet, Count of Anjou. In 1138, the Empress's half-brother Robert of Gloucester rebelled against Stephen, threatening civil war. Together with his close advisor, Waleran de Beaumont, Stephen took firm steps to defend his rule, including arresting a powerful family of bishops. When the Empress and Robert invaded in 1139, Stephen was unable to crush the revolt rapidly, and it took hold in the south-west of England. Captured at the battle of Lincoln in 1141, he was abandoned by many of his followers and lost control of Normandy. He was freed only after his wife and William of Ypres, one of his military commanders, captured Robert at the Rout of Winchester, but the war dragged on for many years with neither side able to win an advantage.

Stephen became increasingly concerned with ensuring that his son Eustace would inherit his throne. The King tried to convince the church to agree to crown Eustace to reinforce his claim. Pope Eugene III refused, and Stephen found himself in a sequence of increasingly bitter arguments with his senior clergy. In 1153, the Empress's son Henry invaded England and built an alliance of powerful regional barons to support his claim for the throne. The two armies met at Wallingford, but neither side's barons were keen to fight another pitched battle. Stephen began to examine a negotiated peace, a process hastened by the sudden death of Eustace. Later in the year Stephen and Henry agreed to the Treaty of Winchester, in which Stephen recognised Henry as his heir in exchange for peace, passing over William, Stephen's second son. Stephen died the following year. Modern historians have extensively debated the extent to which his personality, external events, or the weaknesses in the Norman state contributed to this prolonged period of civil war.

== Early life (1097–1135) ==
=== Childhood ===
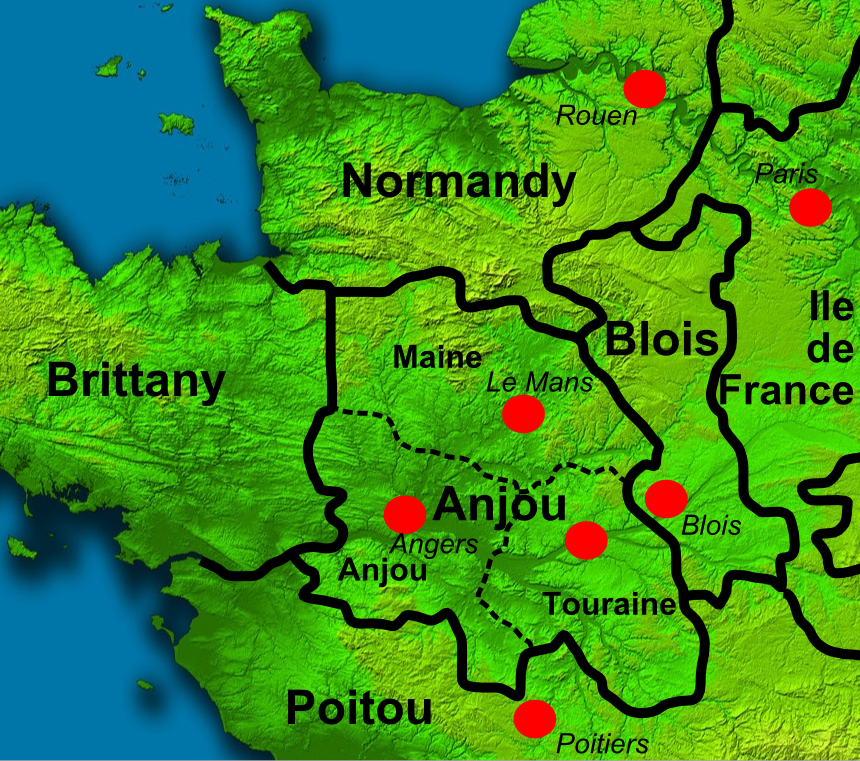
Northern France around the time of Stephen's birth

Stephen was born in Blois, France, in either 1092 or 1096. (Note: Opinions vary considerably among historians as to the date of Stephen's birth. R. H. Davis proposes 1096, King 1092.) His father was Stephen-Henry, Count of Blois and Chartres, an important French nobleman and an active crusader who died when Stephen was at most ten years old. During the First Crusade, Stephen-Henry had acquired a reputation for cowardice, and he returned to the Levant again in 1101 to rebuild his reputation; there he was killed at the battle of Ramlah. Stephen's mother, Adela, was the daughter of William the Conqueror and Matilda of Flanders. She was famous among her contemporaries for her piety and strong personality. Adela was a major reason for Stephen-Henry's return to the Levant. She had a strong formative influence on Stephen during his growing years. She lived to see her son take her father's throne of England, but died within a year after that. (Note: Adela was one of the major reasons for Stephen-Henry deciding to return to the Levant in 1101; Edmund King notes that she gave her husband "very active encouragement" to return; Christopher Tyerman more colourfully describes how she "waged an incessant campaign of bullying and moral blackmail, her nagging extending to their bedroom, where, before intercourse, she would urge her disgraced husband to consider his reputation and return to the Holy Land".)

In the 12th century, France was a loose collection of counties and smaller polities under the minimal control of the king of France. The king's power was linked to his control of the rich province of Île-de-France, just to the east of Stephen's home county of Blois. To the west lay the three counties of Maine, Anjou and Touraine, and to the north of Blois was the Duchy of Normandy, from which William the Conqueror had conquered England in 1066. William's children were still fighting over the collective Anglo-Norman inheritance. The rulers across this region spoke a similar language, albeit with regional dialects; followed the same religion; and were closely interrelated. They were also highly competitive and frequently in conflict with one another for valuable territory and the castles that controlled those territories.

Stephen had at least four brothers and one sister, along with two probable half-sisters. His eldest brother was William, who under normal circumstances would have ruled Blois and Chartres. William was probably intellectually disabled, and Adela instead had the counties pass to her second son, Theobald, later also Count of Champagne. (Note: Stephen's brother William was described by chroniclers as being "deficient in intelligence ... second rate"; he also took a strange oath in Chartres Cathedral to kill the local bishop. His precise difficulties or condition remain unclear.) Stephen's other older brother, Odo, died young, probably in his early teens.

Stephen's younger brother, Henry, was probably born four years after him. The brothers formed a close-knit family group, and Adela encouraged Stephen to take up the role of a feudal knight or baron, whilst steering Henry towards a career in the church, possibly so that their personal career interests would not overlap. Unusually, Stephen was raised in his mother's household rather than being sent to a close relative; he was taught Latin and riding, and was educated in recent history and Biblical stories by his tutor, William the Norman.

=== Relationship with Henry I ===
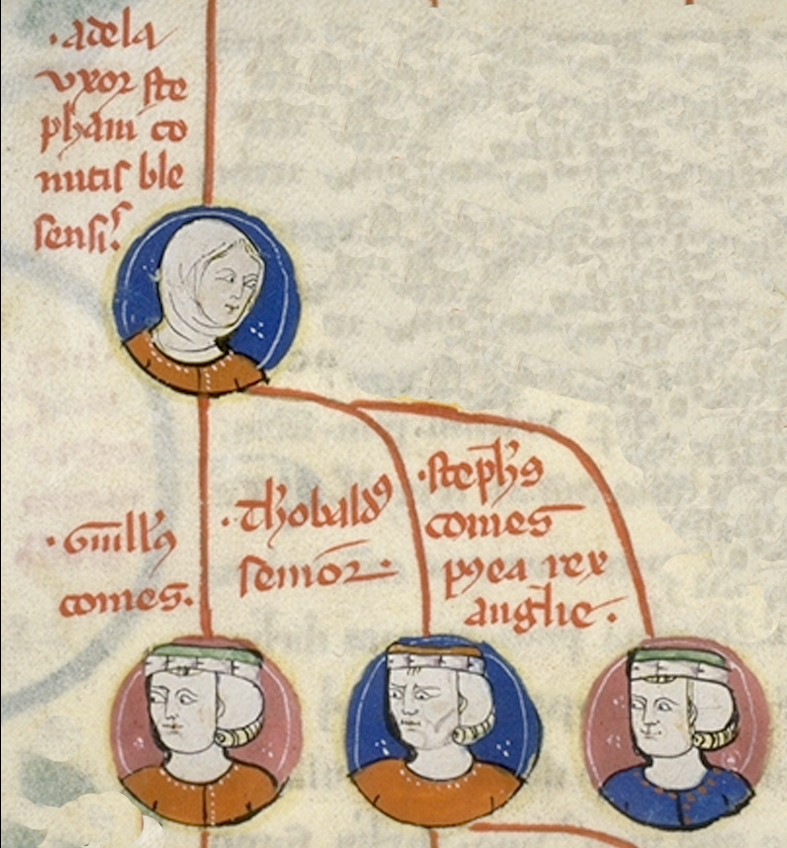
A 14th-century depiction of Stephen's family tree, with his mother Adela at the top, and, left to right, William, Theobald and Stephen

Stephen's early life was heavily influenced by his relationship with his uncle Henry I. Henry seized power in England following the death of his elder brother William Rufus. In 1106 he invaded and captured the Duchy of Normandy, controlled by his eldest brother, Robert Curthose, defeating Robert's army at the battle of Tinchebray. Henry then found himself in conflict with Louis VI of France, who took the opportunity to declare Robert's son, William Clito, the Duke of Normandy.

Henry responded by forming a network of alliances with the western counties of France against Louis, resulting in a regional conflict that would last throughout Stephen's early life. Adela and Theobald allied themselves with Henry, and Stephen's mother decided to place him in Henry's court. Henry fought his next military campaign in Normandy, from 1111 onwards, where rebels led by Robert of Bellême were opposing his rule. Stephen was probably with Henry during the military campaign of 1112, when he was knighted by the King. He was present at court during the King's visit to the Abbey of Saint-Evroul in 1113. Stephen probably first visited England in either 1113 or 1115, almost certainly as part of Henry's court.

Henry became a powerful patron of Stephen, and probably chose to support him because Stephen was part of his extended family and a regional ally, yet not sufficiently wealthy or powerful in his own right to represent a threat to either the King or his son and heir, William Adelin. As a third surviving son, even of an influential regional family, Stephen still needed the support of a powerful patron to progress in life.

With Henry's support, Stephen rapidly began to accumulate lands and possessions. Following the battle of Tinchebray in 1106, Henry confiscated the County of Mortain from his cousin William and the Honour of Eye from Robert Malet. In 1113, Stephen was granted both the title and the honour, although without the lands previously held by William in England. The gift of the Honour of Lancaster also followed after it was confiscated by Henry from Roger the Poitevin. Stephen was also given lands in Alençon in southern Normandy by Henry, but the local Normans rebelled, seeking assistance from Count Fulk IV of Anjou. Stephen and his older brother Theobald were comprehensively beaten in the subsequent campaign, which culminated in the Battle of Alençon, and the territories were not recovered.

=== White Ship and succession ===
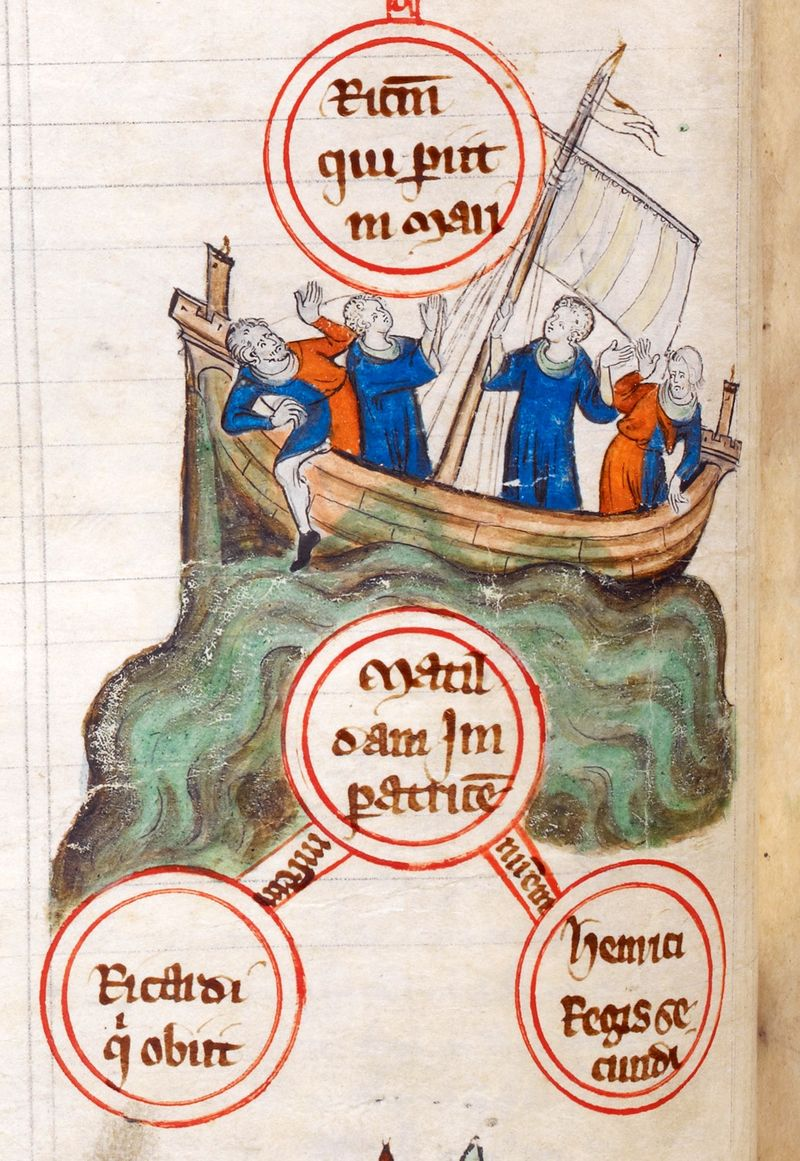
An early 14th-century depiction of the White Ship sinking in 1120

In 1120, the English political landscape changed dramatically. Three hundred passengers embarked on the White Ship to travel from Barfleur in Normandy to England, including the heir to the throne, William Adelin, and many other senior nobles. Stephen had intended to sail on the same ship but changed his mind at the last moment and got off to await another vessel, either out of concern for overcrowding on board the ship, or because he was suffering from diarrhoea. (Note: Contemporary chroniclers varied in their explanation for Stephen's absence from the White Ship, Orderic gives his illness as the reason.) The ship foundered en route, and all but one of the passengers died, including William Adelin. (Note: There has been extensive speculation as to the cause of the sinking of the White Ship. Some theories centre on overcrowding, while others blame excessive drinking by the ship's master and crew.)

With William Adelin dead, the inheritance to the English throne was thrown into doubt. Rules of succession in western Europe at the time were uncertain; in some parts of France, male primogeniture, in which the eldest son would inherit a title, was becoming increasingly popular. It was also traditional for the king of France to crown his successor whilst he himself was still alive, making the intended line of succession relatively clear, but this was not the case in England. In other parts of Europe, including Normandy and England, the tradition was for lands to be divided up, with the eldest son taking patrimonial lands—usually considered to be the most valuable—and younger sons being given smaller, or more recently acquired, partitions or estates.

There was no precedent of a woman ruler. The problem was further complicated by the sequence of unstable Anglo-Norman successions over the previous sixty years – William the Conqueror had gained England by force; two of his sons, Robert Curthose and William Rufus, had fought a war amongst themselves for the throne, with Rufus, who was younger, emerging victorious; and Henry had likewise acquired control of Normandy only by force. There had been no peaceful, uncontested successions.

Henry had only one other legitimate child, the Empress Matilda, but as a woman she was at a substantial political disadvantage. Shortly after the death of his son, the King took a second wife, Adeliza of Louvain, but it became increasingly clear that he would not have another legitimate son, and he instead looked to Matilda as his intended heir. Matilda was married to Holy Roman Emperor Henry V, but her husband died in 1125, and she was remarried in 1128 to Geoffrey Plantagenet, Count of Anjou, whose lands bordered the Duchy of Normandy. Geoffrey was unpopular with the Anglo-Norman elite: as an Angevin ruler, he was a traditional enemy of the Normans. At the same time, tensions continued to grow as a result of Henry's domestic policies, in particular the high level of revenue he was raising to pay for his various wars. Conflict was curtailed, however, by the power of the King's personality and reputation.

Meanwhile, the King arranged for Stephen to marry in 1125 to Matilda, the daughter and sole heir of count Eustace III of Boulogne, who owned both the important continental port of Boulogne and vast estates in the north-west and south-east of England. In 1127, William Clito, a potential claimant to the English throne, seemed likely to become the Count of Flanders; Henry sent Stephen on a mission to prevent this, and in the aftermath of his successful election, William attacked Stephen's lands in neighbouring Boulogne in retaliation. Eventually, a truce was declared, and William died the following year.

Henry attempted to build up a base of political support for his daughter Matilda in both England and Normandy, demanding that his court take oaths first in 1127, and then again in 1128 and 1131, to recognise Matilda as his immediate successor and recognise her descendants as the rightful rulers after her. Stephen was amongst those who took this oath in 1127. Nonetheless, relations between Henry, Matilda, and Geoffrey became increasingly strained towards the end of the King's life. Matilda and Geoffrey suspected that they lacked genuine support in England, and proposed to Henry in 1135 that the King should hand over the royal castles in Normandy to Matilda whilst he was still alive and insist on the Norman nobility swearing immediate allegiance to her, thereby giving the couple a much more powerful position after Henry's death. Henry angrily declined to do so, probably out of a concern that Geoffrey would try to seize power in Normandy somewhat earlier than intended. A fresh rebellion broke out in southern Normandy, and Geoffrey and Matilda intervened militarily on behalf of the rebels. In the middle of this confrontation, Henry unexpectedly fell ill and died near Lyons-la-Forêt.

== Succession (1135) ==
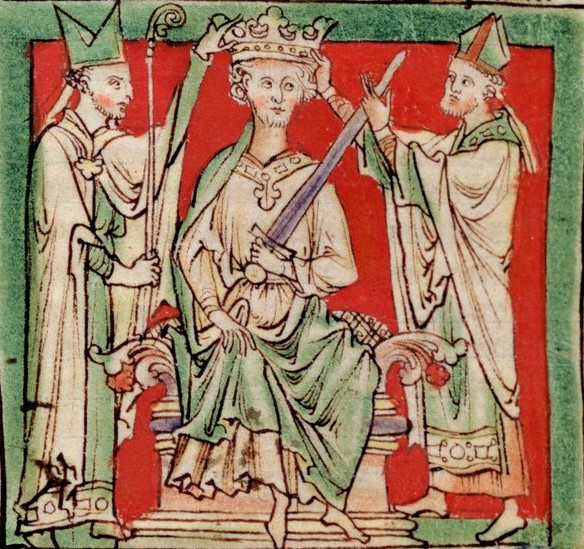
A 13th-century depiction of the coronation of Stephen, by Matthew Paris

Stephen was a well established figure in Anglo-Norman society by 1135. He was extremely wealthy, well-mannered and liked by his peers; he was also considered a man capable of firm action. Chroniclers recorded that despite his wealth and power he was a modest and easy-going leader, happy to sit with his men and servants, casually laughing and eating with them. He was very pious, both in terms of his observance of religious rituals and his personal generosity to the church. Stephen also had a personal Augustinian confessor appointed to him by the Archbishop of Canterbury, who implemented a penitential regime for him, and Stephen encouraged the new order of Cistercians to form abbeys on his estates, winning him additional allies within the church.

Rumours about his father's cowardice during the First Crusade, however, continued to circulate, and a desire to avoid the same reputation may have influenced some of Stephen's rasher military actions. His wife, Matilda, played a major role in running their vast English estates, which contributed to the couple being the second-richest lay household in the country after the King and Queen. The landless Flemish nobleman William of Ypres had joined Stephen's household in 1133.

Stephen's younger brother, Henry of Blois, had also risen to power under Henry I. Henry of Blois had become a Cluniac monk and followed Stephen to England, where the King made him Abbot of Glastonbury, the richest abbey in England. The King then appointed him Bishop of Winchester, one of the richest bishoprics, allowing him to retain Glastonbury as well. The combined revenues of the two positions made Henry of Blois the second-richest man in England after the King. The bishop was keen to reverse what he perceived as encroachment by the Norman kings on the rights of the church. English kings had traditionally exercised a great deal of power and autonomy over the church within their territories. From the 1040s onwards, successive popes had put forward a reforming message that emphasised the importance of the church being "governed more coherently and more hierarchically from the centre" and established "its own sphere of authority and jurisdiction, separate from and independent of that of the lay ruler", in the words of historian Richard Huscroft.

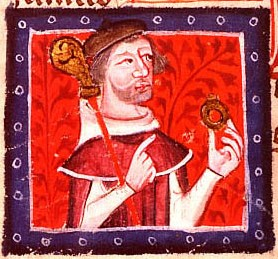
A contemporary depiction of Stephen's brother Henry of Blois, with his bishop's staff and ring

When news began to spread of Henry I's death, many of the potential claimants to the throne were not well placed to respond. Geoffrey and Matilda were in Anjou, rather awkwardly supporting the rebels in their campaign against the royal army, which included a number of Matilda's supporters such as Robert of Gloucester. Many of these barons had taken an oath to stay in Normandy until the late King was properly buried, which prevented them from returning to England. Stephen's brother Theobald was further south still, in Blois. Stephen was in Boulogne, and when news reached him of Henry's death he left for England, accompanied by his military household. Robert had garrisoned the ports of Dover and Canterbury and some accounts suggest that they refused Stephen access when he first arrived. Nonetheless, Stephen probably reached his own estate on the edge of London by 8 December and over the next week he began to seize power in England.

The crowds in London traditionally claimed a right to elect the king, and they proclaimed Stephen the new monarch, believing that he would grant the city new rights and privileges in return. Henry of Blois delivered the support of the church to Stephen: Stephen was able to advance to Winchester, where Roger, Bishop of Salisbury and Lord Chancellor, instructed the royal treasury to be handed over to Stephen. On 15 December, Henry delivered an agreement under which Stephen would grant extensive freedoms and liberties to the church, in exchange for the Archbishop of Canterbury and the Papal Legate supporting his succession to the throne. There was the slight problem of the religious oath that Stephen had taken to support the Empress Matilda, but Henry convincingly argued that the late king had been wrong to insist that his court take the oath.

Henry of Blois argued that the late king had only insisted on that oath to protect the stability of the kingdom, and in light of the chaos that might now ensue, Stephen would be justified in ignoring it. Henry was also able to persuade Hugh Bigod, the late king's royal steward, to swear that King Henry had changed his mind about the succession on his deathbed, nominating Stephen instead. (Note: Modern historians, such as Edmund King, doubt that Hugh Bigod was being truthful in his account.) Stephen's coronation was held a week later at Westminster Abbey on 22 December 1135. (Note: Opinions vary over the degree to which Stephen's acquisition of power resembled a coup. Frank Barlow, for example, describes it as a straightforward coup d'état; King is less certain that this is an appropriate description of events.)

Meanwhile, the Norman nobility gathered at Le Neubourg to discuss declaring Theobald king, probably following the news that Stephen was gathering support in England. The Normans argued that Theobald, as the more senior grandson of William the Conqueror, had the most valid claim over the kingdom and the duchy, and was certainly preferable to Matilda.

Theobald met with the Norman barons and Robert of Gloucester at Lisieux on 21 December. Their discussions were interrupted by the sudden news from England that Stephen's coronation was to occur the next day. Theobald then agreed to the Normans' proposal that he be made king, only to find that his former support immediately ebbed away: the barons were not prepared to support the division of England and Normandy by opposing Stephen, who subsequently financially compensated Theobald, who in return remained in Blois and supported his brother's succession. (Note: The events in Normandy are less well recorded than elsewhere, and the exact sequence of events less certain. Historian Robert Helmerichs, for example, describes some of the inconsistencies in these accounts. Some historians, including David Crouch and Helmerichs, argue that Theobald and Stephen had probably already made a private deal to seize the throne when Henry died.)

== Early reign (1136–1139) ==
=== Initial years (1136–1137) ===
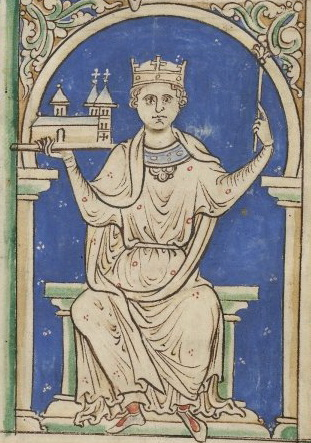
A miniature depicting Stephen from Matthew Paris's Historia Anglorum, 1250s

Stephen's new Anglo-Norman kingdom had been shaped by the Norman Conquest of England in 1066, followed by the Norman expansion into south Wales over the coming years. Both the kingdom and duchy were dominated by a small number of major barons who owned lands on both sides of the English Channel, with the lesser barons beneath them usually having more localised holdings. The extent to which lands and positions should be passed down through hereditary right or by the gift of the King was still uncertain, and tensions concerning this issue had grown during the reign of Henry I.

Lands in Normandy, passed by hereditary right, were usually considered more important to major barons than those in England, where their possession was less certain. Henry had increased the authority and capabilities of the central royal administration, often bringing in "new men" to fulfil key positions rather than using the established nobility. In the process he had been able to maximise revenues and contain expenditures, resulting in a healthy surplus and a famously large treasury, but also increasing political tensions. (Note: The nature of Henry's administration and the links between England and Normandy have been hotly debated by historians. C. Warren Hollister, for example, argues that Henry I created a balanced, well-functioning political system beneath him, balancing the different tensions in England and Normandy, an analysis broadly shared by Frank Barlow. By contrast, David Carpenter draws more attention to the pressures on the Anglo-Norman system during Henry's reign and the strains that built up during the period. Marjorie Chibnall's analysis of Normandy during these years notes both the distinctive aspects of Normandy politics, the pressure on the cross-Channel relationship and the persisting ties between the English and Norman elites.)

Stephen had to intervene in the north of England immediately after his coronation. David I of Scotland invaded the north on the news of Henry's death, taking Carlisle, Newcastle and other key strongholds. Northern England was a disputed territory at this time, with the Scottish kings laying a traditional claim to Cumberland, and David also claiming Northumbria by virtue of his marriage to Matilda of Huntingdon. Stephen rapidly marched north with an army and met David at Durham. An agreement was made under which David would return most of the territory he had taken, with the exception of Carlisle. In return, Stephen confirmed the English possessions of David's son Henry, including the Earldom of Huntingdon.

Returning south, Stephen held his first royal court at Easter 1136. A wide range of nobles gathered at Westminster for the event, including many of the Anglo-Norman barons and most of the higher officials of the church. Stephen issued a new royal charter, confirming the promises he had made to the church, promising to reverse Henry I's policies on the royal forests and to reform any abuses of the royal legal system. He portrayed himself as the natural successor to Henry's policies, and reconfirmed the existing seven earldoms in the kingdom on their existing holders.

The Easter court was a lavish event, and a large amount of money was spent on the event itself, clothes and gifts. Stephen gave out grants of land and favours to those present and endowed numerous church foundations with land and privileges. His accession to the throne still needed to be ratified by the Pope, however, and Henry of Blois appears to have been responsible for ensuring that testimonials of support were sent both from their brother Theobald and from Louis VI of France, to whom Stephen represented a useful balance to Angevin power in the north of France. Pope Innocent II confirmed Stephen as king by letter later that year, and Stephen's advisers circulated copies widely around England to demonstrate his legitimacy.

Troubles continued across Stephen's kingdom. After the Welsh victory at the battle of Llwchwr in January 1136 and the successful ambush of Richard Fitz Gilbert de Clare in April, south Wales rose in rebellion, starting in east Glamorgan and rapidly spreading across the rest of south Wales during 1137. Owain Gwynedd and Gruffydd ap Rhys successfully captured considerable territories, including Carmarthen Castle. Stephen responded by sending Richard's brother Baldwin and the Marcher Lord Robert Fitz Harold of Ewyas into Wales to pacify the region. Neither mission was particularly successful, and by the end of 1137, the King appears to have abandoned attempts to put down the rebellion. Historian David Crouch suggests that Stephen effectively "bowed out of Wales" around this time to concentrate on his other problems. Meanwhile, he had put down two revolts in the south-west led by Baldwin de Redvers and Robert of Bampton; Baldwin was released after his capture and travelled to Normandy, where he became an increasingly vocal critic of the King.

The security of Normandy was also a concern. Geoffrey of Anjou invaded in early 1136 and, after a temporary truce, invaded later the same year, raiding and burning estates rather than trying to hold the territory. Events in England meant that Stephen was unable to travel to Normandy himself, so Waleran de Beaumont, appointed by Stephen as the lieutenant of Normandy, and Theobald led the efforts to defend the duchy. Stephen himself only returned to the duchy in 1137, where he met with Louis VI and Theobald to agree to an informal regional alliance, probably brokered by Henry, to counter the growing Angevin power in the region. As part of this deal, Louis recognised Stephen's son Eustace as Duke of Normandy in exchange for Eustace giving fealty to the French king. Stephen was less successful, however, in regaining the Argentan province along the Normandy and Anjou border, which Geoffrey had taken at the end of 1135. Stephen formed an army to retake it, but the frictions between his Flemish mercenary forces led by William of Ypres and the local Norman barons resulted in a battle between the two halves of his army. The Norman forces then deserted Stephen, forcing the King to give up his campaign. He agreed to another truce with Geoffrey, promising to pay him 2,000 marks a year in exchange for peace along the Norman borders. (Note: Geoffrey of Anjou appears to have agreed to this at least partially because of the pressure of the combined Anglo-Norman–French regional alliance against him.) (Note: Medieval financial figures are notoriously hard to convert into modern currency; for comparison, 2,000 marks equated to around £1,333 in a period in which a major castle rebuilding project might cost around £1,115.)

In the years following his succession, Stephen's relationship with the church became gradually more complex. The royal charter of 1136 had promised to review the ownership of all the lands that had been taken by the crown from the church since 1087, but these estates were now typically owned by nobles. Henry of Blois's claims, in his role as Abbot of Glastonbury, to extensive lands in Devon resulted in considerable local unrest. In 1136, Archbishop of Canterbury William de Corbeil died. Stephen responded by seizing his personal wealth, which caused some discontent amongst the senior clergy. Henry wanted to succeed to the post, but Stephen instead supported Theobald of Bec, who was eventually appointed. The papacy named Henry papal legate, possibly as consolation for not receiving Canterbury.

Stephen's first few years as king can be interpreted in different ways. He stabilised the northern border with Scotland, contained Geoffrey's attacks on Normandy, was at peace with Louis VI, enjoyed good relations with the church and had the broad support of his barons. There were significant underlying problems, nonetheless. King David and Prince Henry now controlled the north of England, Stephen had abandoned Wales, the fighting in Normandy had considerably destabilised the duchy, and an increasing number of barons felt that Stephen had given them neither the lands nor the titles they felt they deserved or were owed. Stephen was also rapidly running out of money: Henry's considerable treasury had been emptied by 1138 due to the costs of running Stephen's more lavish court and the need to raise and maintain his mercenary armies fighting in England and Normandy.

=== Defending the kingdom (1138–1139) ===
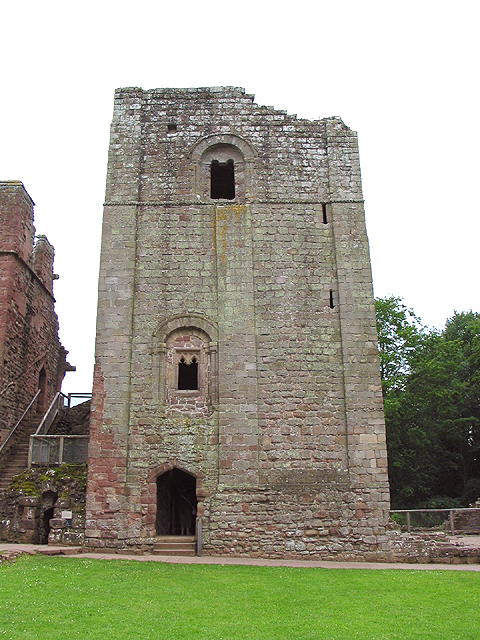
The stone keep at Goodrich in Herefordshire, an example of the style of fortification slowly beginning to replace earth-and-wooden motte and bailey castle design by the late 1130s

Stephen was attacked on several fronts during 1138. First, Robert, Earl of Gloucester, rebelled against the King, starting the descent into civil war in England. An illegitimate son of Henry I and the half-brother of the Empress Matilda, Robert was one of the most powerful Anglo-Norman barons, controlling estates in Normandy. He was known for his qualities as a statesman, his military experience, and leadership ability. Robert had tried to convince Theobald to take the throne in 1135; he did not attend Stephen's first court in 1136 and it took several summonses to convince him to attend court at Oxford later that year. In 1138, Robert renounced his fealty to Stephen and declared his support for Matilda, triggering a major regional rebellion in Kent and across the south-west of England, although Robert himself remained in Normandy. In France, Geoffrey of Anjou took advantage of the situation by re-invading Normandy. David of Scotland also invaded the north of England once again, announcing that he was supporting the claim of his niece the Empress Matilda to the throne, pushing south into Yorkshire. (Note: King David was a maternal uncle to both the Empress Matilda and Matilda of Boulogne, Stephen's wife.)

Anglo-Norman warfare during the reign of Stephen was characterised by attritional military campaigns, in which commanders tried to seize key enemy castles in order to allow them to take control of their adversaries' territory and ultimately win a slow, strategic victory. The armies of the period centred on bodies of mounted, armoured knights, supported by infantry and crossbowmen. These forces were either feudal levies, drawn up by local nobles for a limited period of service during a campaign, or, increasingly, mercenaries, who were expensive but more flexible and often more skilled. These armies, however, were ill-suited to besieging castles, whether the older motte-and-bailey designs or the newer, stone-built keeps. Existing siege engines were significantly less powerful than the later trebuchet designs, giving defenders a substantial advantage over attackers. As a result, slow sieges to starve defenders out, or mining operations to undermine walls, tended to be preferred by commanders over direct assaults. Occasionally pitched battles were fought between armies but these were considered highly risky endeavours and were usually avoided by prudent commanders. The cost of warfare had risen considerably in the first part of the 12th century, and adequate supplies of ready cash were increasingly proving important in the success of campaigns.

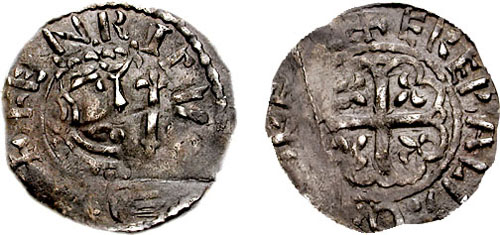
A silver penny of Prince Henry of Scotland, minted in his own name at Corbridge in Northumberland after his peace deal with Stephen

Stephen's personal qualities as a military leader focused on his skill in personal combat, his capabilities in siege warfare and a remarkable ability to move military forces quickly over relatively long distances. In response to the revolts and invasions, he rapidly undertook several military campaigns, focusing primarily on England rather than Normandy. His wife Matilda was sent to Kent with ships and resources from Boulogne, with the task of retaking the key port of Dover, under Robert's control. A small number of Stephen's household knights were sent north to help the fight against the Scots, where David's forces were defeated later that year at the battle of the Standard in August by the forces of Thurstan, the Archbishop of York. Despite this victory, however, David still occupied most of the north. Stephen himself went west in an attempt to regain control of Gloucestershire, first striking north into the Welsh Marches, taking Hereford and Shrewsbury, before heading south to Bath. The town of Bristol itself proved too strong for him, and Stephen contented himself with raiding and pillaging the surrounding area. The rebels appear to have expected Robert to intervene with support that year, but he remained in Normandy throughout, trying to persuade the Empress Matilda to invade England herself. Dover finally surrendered to the Queen's forces later in the year.

Stephen's military campaign in England had progressed well, and historian David Crouch describes it as "a military achievement of the first rank". The King took the opportunity of his military advantage to forge a peace agreement with Scotland. Stephen's wife Matilda was sent to negotiate another agreement between Stephen and David, called the treaty of Durham; Northumbria and Cumbria would effectively be granted to David and his son Henry, in exchange for their fealty and future peace along the border. The powerful Ranulf II, Earl of Chester, considered himself to hold the traditional rights to Carlisle and Cumberland and was extremely displeased to see them being given to the Scots. Nonetheless, Stephen could now focus his attention on the anticipated invasion of England by Robert and Matilda's forces.

=== Road to civil war (1139) ===
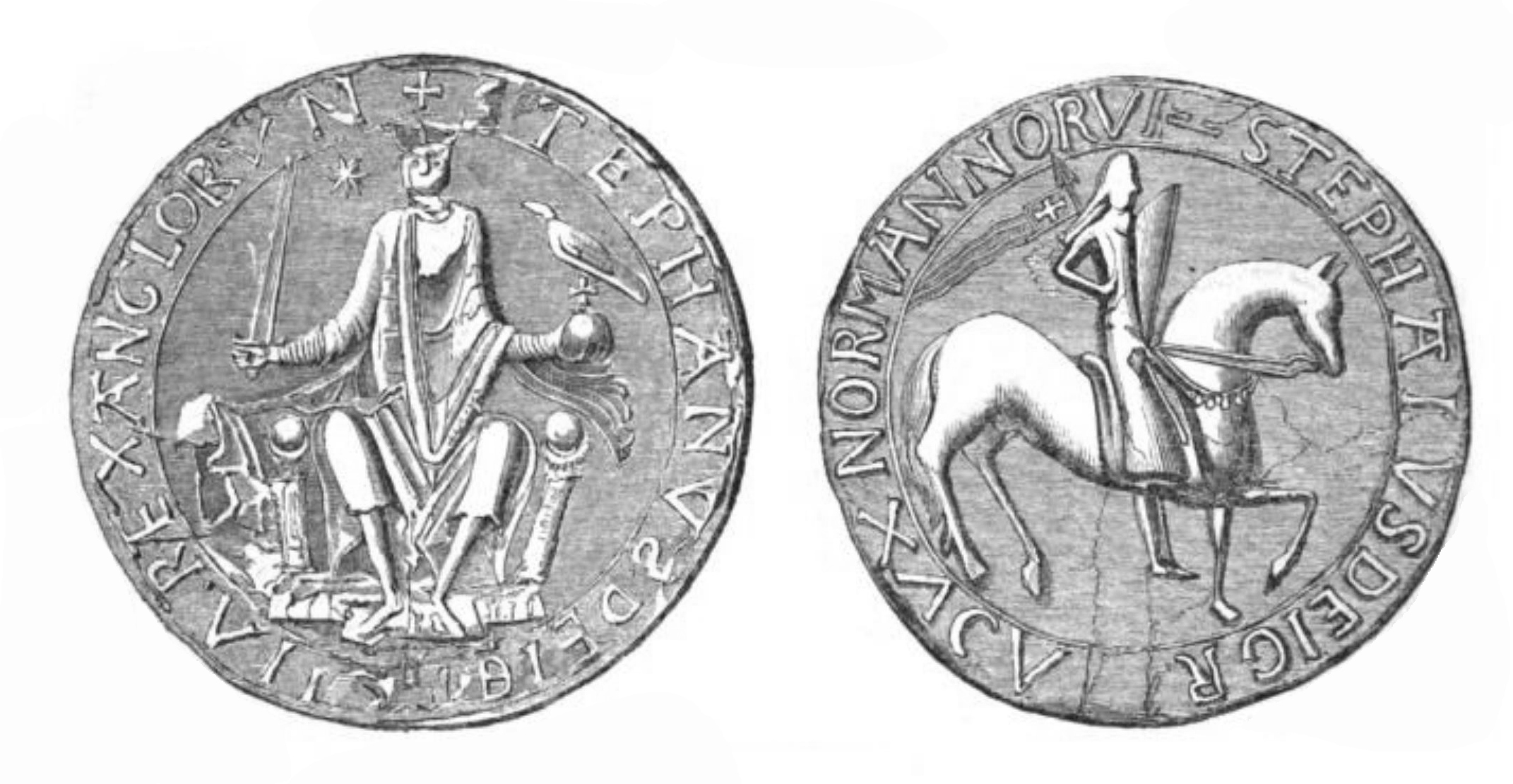
Stephen's Great Seal

Stephen prepared for the Angevin invasion by creating a number of additional earldoms. Only a handful of earldoms had existed under Henry I and these had been largely symbolic in nature. Stephen created many more, filling them with men he considered to be loyal, capable military commanders, and in the more vulnerable parts of the country assigning them new lands and additional executive powers. (Note: R. Davis and W. L. Warren argue that the typical earldom involved the delegation of considerable royal powers; Keith Stringer and Judith Green capture the current consensus that the degree of delegated powers followed the degree of threat and that perhaps less powers in total were delegated than once thought.) He appears to have had several objectives in mind, including both ensuring the loyalty of his key supporters by granting them these honours, and improving his defences in key parts of the kingdom. Stephen was heavily influenced by his principal advisor, Waleran de Beaumont. Waleran, his brothers Robert and Hugh, and their younger cousins received the majority of these new earldoms. From 1138 onwards, Stephen gave them the earldoms of Worcester, Leicester, Hereford, Warwick and Pembroke, which – especially when combined with the possessions of Stephen's new ally, Prince Henry, in Cumberland and Northumbria – created a wide block of territory to act as a buffer zone between the troubled south-west, Chester, and the rest of the kingdom. With their new lands, the power of the Beamounts grew to the point where David Crouch suggests that it became "dangerous to be anything other than a friend of Waleran" at Stephen's court.

Stephen took steps to remove a group of bishops he regarded as a threat to his rule. The royal administration under Henry I had been headed by Roger, Bishop of Salisbury, who was supported by his nephews, Bishops Alexander of Lincoln and Nigel of Ely, and his son, Lord Chancellor Roger le Poer. These bishops were powerful landowners as well as ecclesiastical rulers, and they had begun to build new castles and increase the size of their military forces, leading Stephen to suspect that they were about to defect to the Empress Matilda. Bishop Roger and his family were also enemies of Waleran, who disliked their control of the royal administration. In June 1139, Stephen held his court in Oxford, where a fight between Alan of Brittany and Roger's men broke out, an incident probably deliberately created by Stephen. Stephen responded by demanding that Roger and the other bishops surrender all of their castles in England. This threat was backed up by the arrest of the bishops, with the exception of Nigel who had taken refuge in Devizes Castle; the bishop only surrendered after Stephen besieged the castle and threatened to execute Roger le Poer. The remaining castles were then surrendered to the King. (Note: The impact of these arrests on the efficacy of the subsequent royal administration and the loyalty of the wider English church has been much discussed. Kenji Yoshitake represents the current academic consensus when he notes that the impact of the arrests "was not serious", placing the beginning of the disintegration of the royal government at the subsequent battle of Lincoln.)

Stephen's brother Henry was alarmed by this, both as a matter of principle, since Stephen had previously agreed in 1135 to respect the freedoms of the church, and more pragmatically because he himself had recently built six castles and had no desire to be treated in the same way. As the papal legate, he summoned the King to appear before an ecclesiastical council to answer for the arrests and seizure of property. Henry asserted the church's right to investigate and judge all charges against members of the clergy. Stephen sent Aubrey de Vere II as his spokesman to the council, who argued that Roger of Salisbury had been arrested not as a bishop, but rather in his role as a baron who had been preparing to change his support to the Empress Matilda. The King was supported by Hugh of Amiens, Archbishop of Rouen, who challenged the bishops to show how canon law entitled them to build or hold castles. Aubrey threatened that Stephen would complain to the pope that he was being harassed by the English church, and the council let the matter rest following an unsuccessful appeal to Rome. The incident successfully removed any military threat from the bishops, but it may have damaged Stephen's relationship with the senior clergy, and in particular with his brother Henry. (Note: Keith Stringer argues that Stephen "was surely right" to seize the castles, and that the act was a "calculated display of royal masterfulness"; Jim Bradbury and Frank Barlow praise the military soundness of the tactic. David Carpenter and R. Davis, however, observe that Stephen had ended up breaking his promises to the Church, was forced to appear before a church court, and damaged his relationship with Henry of Blois, which would have grave implications in 1141.)

== Civil war (1139–1154) ==
=== Initial phase of the war (1139–1140) ===
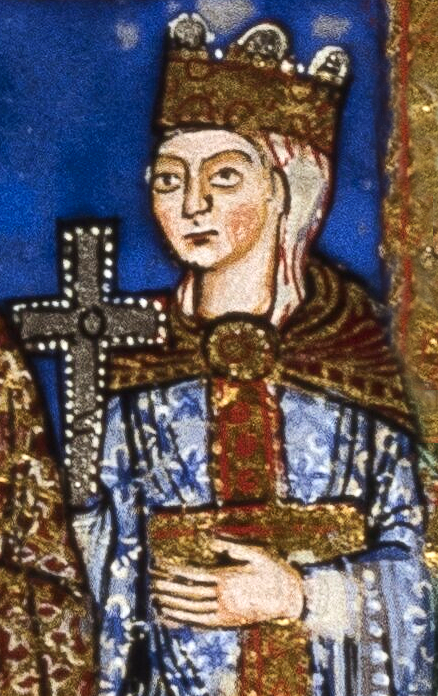
Contemporary depiction of the Empress Matilda

The Angevin invasion finally arrived in 1139. Baldwin de Redvers crossed over from Normandy to Wareham in August in an initial attempt to capture a port to receive the Empress Matilda's invading army, but Stephen's forces forced him to retreat into the south-west. The following month, however, Henry I's widow, Adeliza, invited the Empress to land at Arundel instead, and on 30 September the Empress and Robert of Gloucester arrived in England with 140 knights. (Note: Edmund King disagrees that the Empress received an invitation to Arundel, arguing instead that she arrived unexpectedly.) The Empress stayed at Arundel Castle, whilst Robert marched north-west to Wallingford and Bristol, hoping to raise support for the rebellion and to link up with Miles of Gloucester, a capable military leader who took the opportunity to renounce his fealty to the King. Stephen promptly moved south, besieging Arundel and trapping Matilda inside the castle.

Stephen then agreed to a truce proposed by his brother Henry; the full details of the truce are not known, but the results were that Stephen first released Matilda from the siege and then allowed her and her household of knights to be escorted to the south-west, where they were reunited with Robert. The reasoning behind Stephen's decision to release his rival remains unclear. Contemporary chroniclers suggested that Henry argued that it would be in Stephen's own best interests to release the Empress and concentrate instead on attacking Robert, and Stephen may have seen Robert, not the Empress, as his main opponent at this point in the conflict. He also faced a military dilemma at Arundel—the castle was considered almost impregnable, and he may have been worried that he was tying down his army in the south whilst Robert roamed freely in the west. Another theory is that Stephen released Matilda out of a sense of chivalry; he was certainly known for having a generous, courteous personality and women were not normally expected to be targeted in Anglo-Norman warfare. (Note: "Chivalry" was firmly established as a principle in Anglo-Norman warfare by the time of Stephen; it was not considered appropriate or normal to execute elite prisoners and, as historian John Gillingham observes, neither Stephen nor the Empress Matilda did so except where the opponent had already breached the norms of military conduct.)

Having released the Empress, Stephen focused on pacifying the south-west of England. Although there had been few new defections to the Empress, his enemies now controlled a compact block of territory stretching out from Gloucester and Bristol south-west into Devon and Cornwall, west into the Welsh Marches and east as far as Oxford and Wallingford, threatening London. Stephen started by attacking Wallingford Castle, held by the Empress's childhood friend Brien FitzCount, only to find it too well defended. He then left behind some forces to blockade the castle and continued west into Wiltshire to attack Trowbridge Castle, taking the castles of South Cerney and Malmesbury en route. Meanwhile, Miles of Gloucester marched east, attacking Stephen's rearguard forces at Wallingford and threatening an advance on London. Stephen was forced to give up his western campaign, returning east to stabilise the situation and protect his capital.

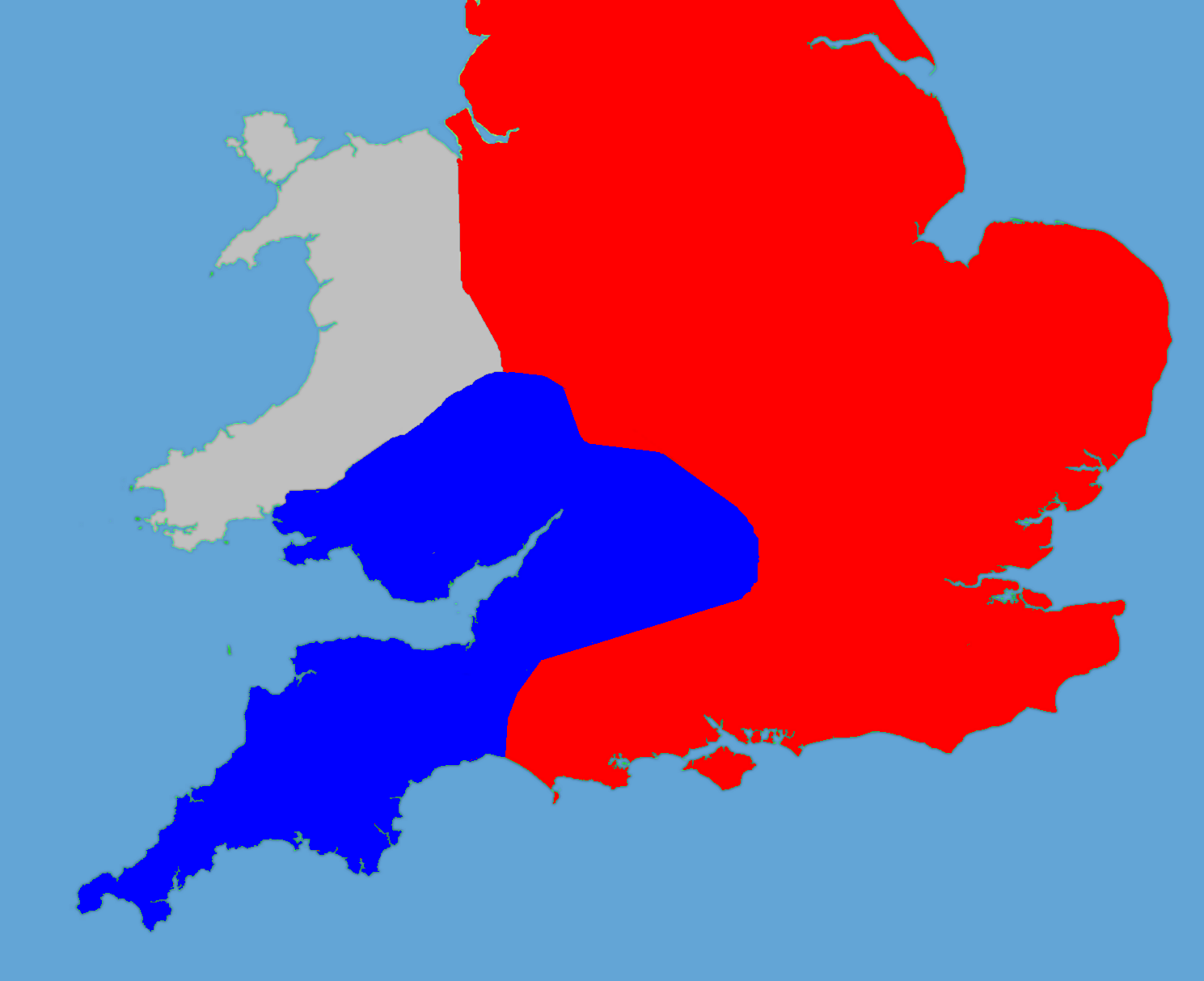
Political map of the Angevin and Welsh revolt in 1140; red indicates those areas under Stephen's control; blue – Angevin; grey – indigenous Welsh

At the start of 1140, Nigel, Bishop of Ely, whose castles Stephen had confiscated the previous year, rebelled against Stephen as well. Nigel hoped to seize East Anglia and established his base of operations in the Isle of Ely, then surrounded by protective fenland. Stephen responded quickly, taking an army into the fens and using boats lashed together to form a causeway that allowed him to make a surprise attack on the isle. Nigel escaped to Gloucester, but his men and castle were captured, and order was temporarily restored in the east. Robert's men retook some of the territory that Stephen had taken in his 1139 campaign. In an effort to negotiate a truce, Henry of Blois held a peace conference at Bath, to which Stephen sent his wife. The conference collapsed over the insistence by Henry and the clergy that they should set the terms of any peace deal, which Stephen found unacceptable.

Ranulf of Chester remained upset over Stephen's gift of the north of England to Prince Henry. Ranulf devised a plan for dealing with the problem by ambushing Henry whilst the prince was travelling back from Stephen's court to Scotland after Christmas. Stephen responded to rumours of this plan by escorting Henry himself north, but this gesture proved the final straw for Ranulf. Ranulf had previously claimed that he had the rights to Lincoln Castle, held by Stephen, and under the guise of a social visit, Ranulf seized the fortification in a surprise attack. Stephen marched north to Lincoln and agreed to a truce with Ranulf, probably to keep him from joining the Empress's faction, under which Ranulf would be allowed to keep the castle. Stephen returned to London but received news that Ranulf, his brother and their family were relaxing in Lincoln Castle with a minimal guard force, a ripe target for a surprise attack of his own. Abandoning the deal he had just made, Stephen gathered his army again and sped north, but not quite fast enough—Ranulf escaped Lincoln and declared his support for the Empress. Stephen was forced to place the castle under siege.

=== Second phase of the war (1141–1142) ===
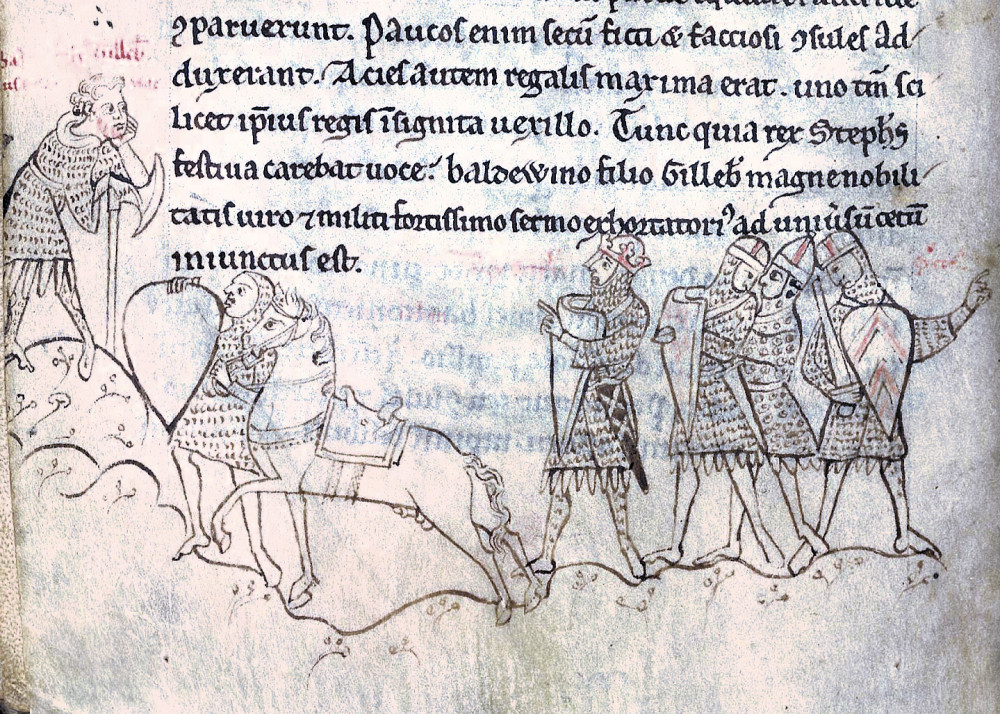
Near contemporary illustration of the Battle of Lincoln in 1141, from the Historia Anglorum; Stephen (wearing a crown, fourth from the right) is listening to Baldwin of Clare orating a battle speech (left).

While Stephen and his army besieged Lincoln Castle at the start of 1141, Robert and Ranulf advanced on the King's position with a somewhat larger force. When the news reached Stephen, he held a council to decide whether to give battle or to withdraw and gather additional soldiers: Stephen decided to fight, resulting in the Battle of Lincoln on 2 February 1141. The King commanded the centre of his army, with Alan of Brittany on his right and William of Aumale on his left. Robert and Ranulf's forces had superiority in cavalry and Stephen dismounted many of his own knights to form a solid infantry block; he joined them himself, fighting on foot in the battle. (Note: David Crouch argues that in fact it was the royalist weakness in infantry that caused their failure at Lincoln, proposing the city militia was not as capable as Robert's Welsh infantry.) Stephen was not a gifted public speaker, and delegated the pre-battle speech to Baldwin of Clare, who delivered a rousing declaration. After an initial success in which William's forces destroyed the Angevins' Welsh infantry, the battle went badly for Stephen. Robert and Ranulf's cavalry encircled Stephen's centre, and the King found himself surrounded by the enemy army. Many of his supporters, including Waleran de Beaumont and William of Ypres, fled from the field at this point but Stephen fought on, defending himself first with his sword and then, when that broke, with a borrowed battle axe. Finally, he was overwhelmed by Robert's men and taken away from the field in custody. (Note: The degree to which Stephen's supporters at the Battle of Lincoln simply fled, wisely retreated or in fact actively betrayed him to the enemy has been extensively debated.)

Robert took Stephen back to Gloucester, where the King met with the Empress Matilda, and was then moved to Bristol Castle, traditionally used for holding high-status prisoners. He was initially left confined in relatively good conditions, but his security was later tightened and he was kept in chains. The Empress now began to take the necessary steps to have herself crowned queen in his place, which would require the agreement of the church and her coronation at Westminster. Bishop Henry summoned a council at Winchester before Easter in his capacity as papal legate to consider the clergy's view. He had made a private deal with the Empress Matilda that he would deliver the support of the church, if she agreed to give him control over church business in England. Henry handed over the royal treasury, rather depleted except for Stephen's crown, to the Empress, and excommunicated many of Stephen's supporters who refused to switch sides. Archbishop Theobald of Canterbury was unwilling to declare Matilda queen so rapidly, however, and a delegation of clergy and nobles, headed by Theobald, travelled to see Stephen in Bristol and consult about their moral dilemma: should they abandon their oaths of fealty to the King? Stephen agreed that, given the situation, he was prepared to release his subjects from their oath of fealty to him, and the clergy gathered again in Winchester after Easter to declare the Empress "Lady of England and Normandy" as a precursor to her coronation. When Matilda advanced to London in an effort to stage her coronation in June, though, she faced an uprising by the local citizens in support of Stephen that forced her to flee to Oxford, uncrowned.

Once news of Stephen's capture reached him, Geoffrey of Anjou invaded Normandy again and, in the absence of Waleran de Beaumont, who was still fighting in England, Geoffrey took all the duchy south of the river Seine and east of the river Risle. No help was forthcoming from Stephen's brother Theobald this time either, who appears to have been preoccupied with his own problems with France—the new French king, Louis VII, had rejected his father's regional alliance, improving relations with Anjou and taking a more bellicose line with Theobald, which would result in war the following year. Geoffrey's success in Normandy and Stephen's weakness in England began to influence the loyalty of many Anglo-Norman barons, who feared losing their lands in England to Robert and the Empress, and their possessions in Normandy to Geoffrey. Many started to leave Stephen's faction. Waleran de Beaumont was one of those who decided to defect in mid-1141, crossing into Normandy to secure his ancestral possessions by allying himself with the Angevins, and bringing Worcestershire into the Empress's camp. Waleran's twin brother, Robert, effectively withdrew from fighting in the conflict at the same time. Other supporters of the Empress were restored in their former strongholds, such as Bishop Nigel of Ely, or received new earldoms in the west of England. The royal control over the minting of coins broke down, leading to coins being struck by local barons and bishops across the country.

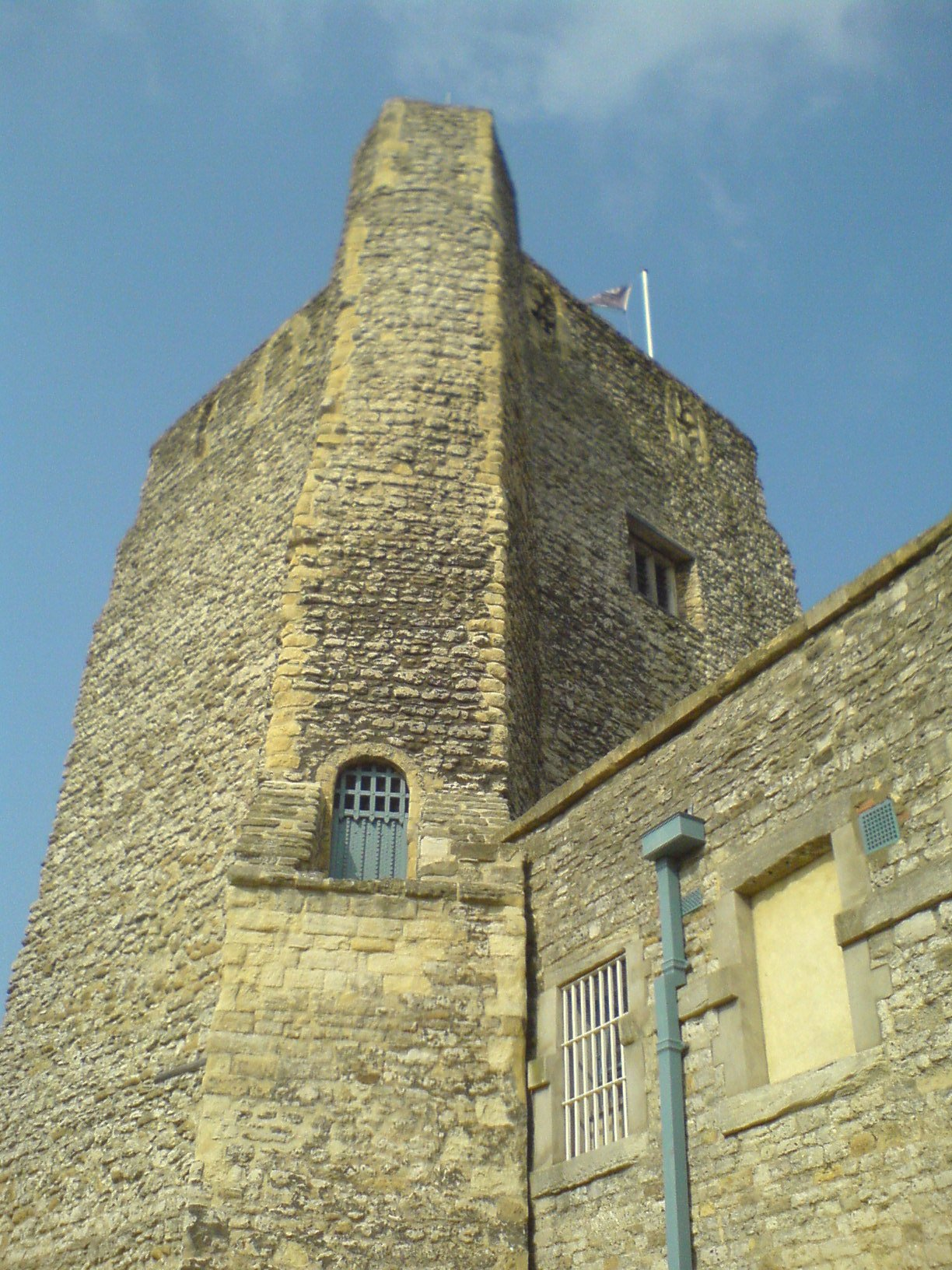
St George's Tower at Oxford Castle, where Stephen almost captured the Empress Matilda

Stephen's wife, Matilda, played a critical part in keeping the King's cause alive during his captivity. Queen Matilda gathered Stephen's remaining lieutenants around her and the royal family in the south-east, advancing into London when the population rejected the Empress. Stephen's long-standing commander William of Ypres remained with the Queen in London; William Martel, the royal steward, commanded operations from Sherborne in Dorset, and Faramus of Boulogne ran the royal household. The Queen appears to have generated genuine sympathy and support from Stephen's more loyal followers. Henry's alliance with the Empress proved short-lived, as they soon fell out over political patronage and ecclesiastical policy; the bishop met the Queen at Guildford and transferred his support to her.

The King's eventual release resulted from the Angevin defeat at the Rout of Winchester. Robert of Gloucester and the Empress besieged Henry in the city of Winchester in July. Queen Matilda and William of Ypres then encircled the Angevin forces with their own army, reinforced with fresh troops from London. In the subsequent battle the Empress's forces were defeated and Robert himself was taken prisoner. Further negotiations attempted to deliver a general peace agreement but the Queen was unwilling to offer any compromise to the Empress, and Robert refused to accept any offer to encourage him to change sides to Stephen. Instead, in November the two sides simply exchanged Robert and the King, with Stephen releasing Robert on 1 November 1141. Stephen began re-establishing his authority. Henry held another church council, which this time reaffirmed Stephen's legitimacy to rule, and a fresh coronation of Stephen and Matilda occurred at Christmas 1141.

At the beginning of 1142 Stephen fell ill, and by Easter rumours had begun to circulate that he had died. Possibly this illness was the result of his imprisonment the previous year, but he finally recovered and travelled north to raise new forces and to successfully convince Ranulf of Chester to change sides once again. Stephen then spent the summer attacking some of the new Angevin castles built the previous year, including Cirencester, Bampton and Wareham. In September, he spotted an opportunity to seize the Empress Matilda herself in Oxford. Oxford was a secure town, protected by walls and the river Isis, but Stephen led a sudden attack across the river, leading the charge and swimming part of the way. Once on the other side, the King and his men stormed into the town, trapping the Empress in the castle. Oxford Castle, however, was a powerful fortress and, rather than storming it, Stephen had to settle down for a long siege, albeit secure in the knowledge that Matilda was now surrounded. Just before Christmas, the Empress left the castle unobserved, crossed the icy river on foot and made her escape to Wallingford. The garrison surrendered shortly afterwards, but Stephen had lost an opportunity to capture his principal opponent.

=== Stalemate (1143–1146) ===
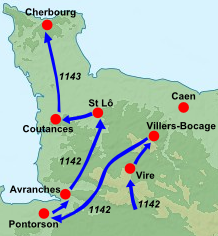
Geoffrey of Anjou's invasion of Normandy, 1142–43

The war between the two sides in England reached a stalemate in the mid-1140s, while Geoffrey of Anjou consolidated his hold on power in Normandy. 1143 started precariously for Stephen when he was besieged by Robert of Gloucester at Wilton Castle, an assembly point for royal forces in Herefordshire. Stephen attempted to break out and escape, resulting in the battle of Wilton. Once again, the Angevin cavalry proved too strong, and for a moment it appeared that Stephen might be captured for a second time. On this occasion, however, William Martel, Stephen's steward, made a fierce rear guard effort, allowing Stephen to escape from the battlefield. Stephen valued William's loyalty sufficiently to agree to exchange Sherborne Castle for his safe release—this was one of the few instances where Stephen was prepared to give up a castle to ransom one of his men.

In late 1143, Stephen faced a new threat in the east, when Geoffrey de Mandeville, Earl of Essex, rose up in rebellion against him in East Anglia. The King had disliked the Earl for several years, and provoked the conflict by summoning Geoffrey to court, where the King arrested him. He threatened to execute Geoffrey unless the Earl handed over his various castles, including the Tower of London, Saffron Walden and Pleshey, all important fortifications because they were in, or close to, London. Geoffrey gave in, but once free he headed north-east into the Fens to the Isle of Ely, from where he began a military campaign against Cambridge, with the intention of progressing south towards London. With all of his other problems and with Hugh Bigod, 1st Earl of Norfolk, in open revolt in Norfolk, Stephen lacked the resources to track Geoffrey down in the Fens and made do with building a screen of castles between Ely and London, including Burwell Castle.

For a period, the situation continued to worsen. Ranulf of Chester revolted once again in the summer of 1144, splitting up Stephen's Honour of Lancaster between himself and Prince Henry. In the west, Robert of Gloucester and his followers continued to raid the surrounding royalist territories, and Wallingford Castle remained a secure Angevin stronghold, too close to London for comfort. Meanwhile, Geoffrey of Anjou finished securing his hold on southern Normandy and in January 1144 he advanced into Rouen, the capital of the duchy, concluding his campaign. Louis VII recognised him as Duke of Normandy shortly after. By this point in the war, Stephen was depending increasingly on his immediate royal household, such as William of Ypres and others, and lacked the support of the major barons who might have been able to provide him with significant additional forces; after the events of 1141, Stephen made little use of his network of earls.

After 1143 the war ground on, but progressing slightly better for Stephen. Miles of Gloucester, one of the most talented Angevin commanders, had died whilst hunting over the previous Christmas, relieving some of the pressure in the west. Geoffrey de Mandeville's rebellion continued until September 1144, when he died during an attack on Burwell. The war in the west progressed better in 1145, with the King recapturing Faringdon Castle in Oxfordshire. In the north, Stephen came to a fresh agreement with Ranulf of Chester, but then in 1146 repeated the ruse he had played on Geoffrey in 1143, first inviting Ranulf to court, before arresting him and threatening to execute him unless he handed over a number of castles, including Lincoln and Coventry. As with Geoffrey, the moment Ranulf was released he immediately rebelled, but the situation was a stalemate: Stephen had few forces in the north with which to prosecute a fresh campaign, whilst Ranulf lacked the castles to support an attack on Stephen. By this point, however, Stephen's practice of inviting barons to court and arresting them had brought him into some disrepute and increasing distrust.

=== Final phases of the war (1147–1152) ===
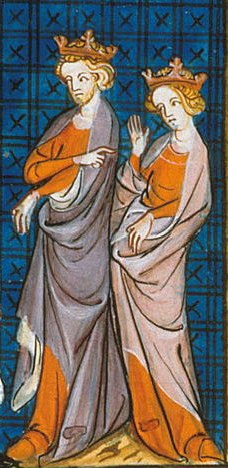
14th-century depiction of Henry FitzEmpress and his wife, Eleanor of Aquitaine

England had suffered extensively from the war by 1147, leading later Victorian historians to call the period of conflict "the Anarchy". (Note: As described below, the name "the Anarchy" for this conflict originates with the Victorian scholar John Round.) The contemporary Anglo-Saxon Chronicle recorded how "there was nothing but disturbance and wickedness and robbery". Certainly in many parts of the country, such as Wiltshire, Berkshire, the Thames Valley and East Anglia, the fighting and raiding had caused serious devastation. Numerous "adulterine", or unauthorised, castles had been built as bases for local lords — the chronicler Robert of Torigny complained that as many as 1,115 such castles had been built during the conflict, although this was probably an exaggeration as elsewhere he suggested an alternative figure of 126. The previously centralised royal coinage system was fragmented, with Stephen, the Empress and local lords all minting their own coins. The royal forest law had collapsed in large parts of the country. Some parts of the country, though, were barely touched by the conflict—for example, Stephen's lands in the south-east and the Angevin heartlands around Gloucester and Bristol were largely unaffected, and David I ruled his territories in the north of England effectively. Stephen's overall income from his estates, however, declined seriously during the conflict, particularly after 1141, and royal control over the minting of new coins remained limited outside of the south-east and East Anglia. With Stephen often based in the south-east, increasingly Westminster, rather than the older site of Winchester, was used as the centre of royal government.

The character of the conflict in England gradually began to shift; as historian Frank Barlow suggests, by the late 1140s "the civil war was over", barring the occasional outbreak of fighting. In 1147 Robert of Gloucester died peacefully, and the next year the Empress Matilda left south-west England for Normandy, both of which contributed to reducing the tempo of the war. The Second Crusade was announced, and many Angevin supporters, including Waleran of Beaumont, joined it, leaving the region for several years. (Note: Stephen did not participate in the Second Crusade himself due to internal conflicts in his kingdom.) Many of the barons were making individual peace agreements with each other to secure their lands and war gains. Henry FitzEmpress, the eldest son of the Empress Matilda, mounted a small mercenary invasion of England in 1147 but the expedition failed, not least because Henry lacked the funds to pay his men. Surprisingly, Stephen himself ended up paying their costs, allowing Henry to return home safely; his reasons for doing so are unclear. One potential explanation is his general courtesy to a member of his extended family; another is that he was starting to consider how to end the war peacefully, and saw this as a way of building a relationship with Henry.

Henry FitzEmpress returned to England again in 1149, this time planning to form a northern alliance with Ranulf of Chester. The Angevin plan involved Ranulf agreeing to give up his claim to Carlisle, held by the Scots, in return for being given the rights to the whole of the Honour of Lancaster; Ranulf would give homage to both David and Henry, with Henry having seniority. Following this peace agreement, Henry and Ranulf agreed to attack York, probably with help from the Scots. Stephen marched rapidly north to York and the planned attack disintegrated, leaving Henry to return to Normandy, where he was declared duke by his father. (Note: Edmund King believes the attack never got close to York; R. Davis believes that it did and was deterred by the presence of Stephen's forces.)

Although still young, Henry was increasingly gaining a reputation as an energetic and capable leader. His prestige and power increased further when he unexpectedly married the attractive Eleanor, Duchess of Aquitaine, the recently divorced wife of Louis VII, in 1152. The marriage made Henry the future ruler of a huge swathe of territory across France.

In the final years of the war, Stephen began to focus on the issue of his family and the succession. He wanted to confirm his eldest son, Eustace, as his successor, although chroniclers recorded that Eustace was infamous for levying heavy taxes and extorting money from those on his lands. Stephen's second son, William, was married to the extremely wealthy heiress Isabel de Warenne, Countess of Surrey. In 1148, Stephen built the Cluniac Faversham Abbey as a resting place for his family. Both Stephen's wife, Matilda, and his brother Theobald died in 1152.

=== Argument with the church (1145–1152) ===
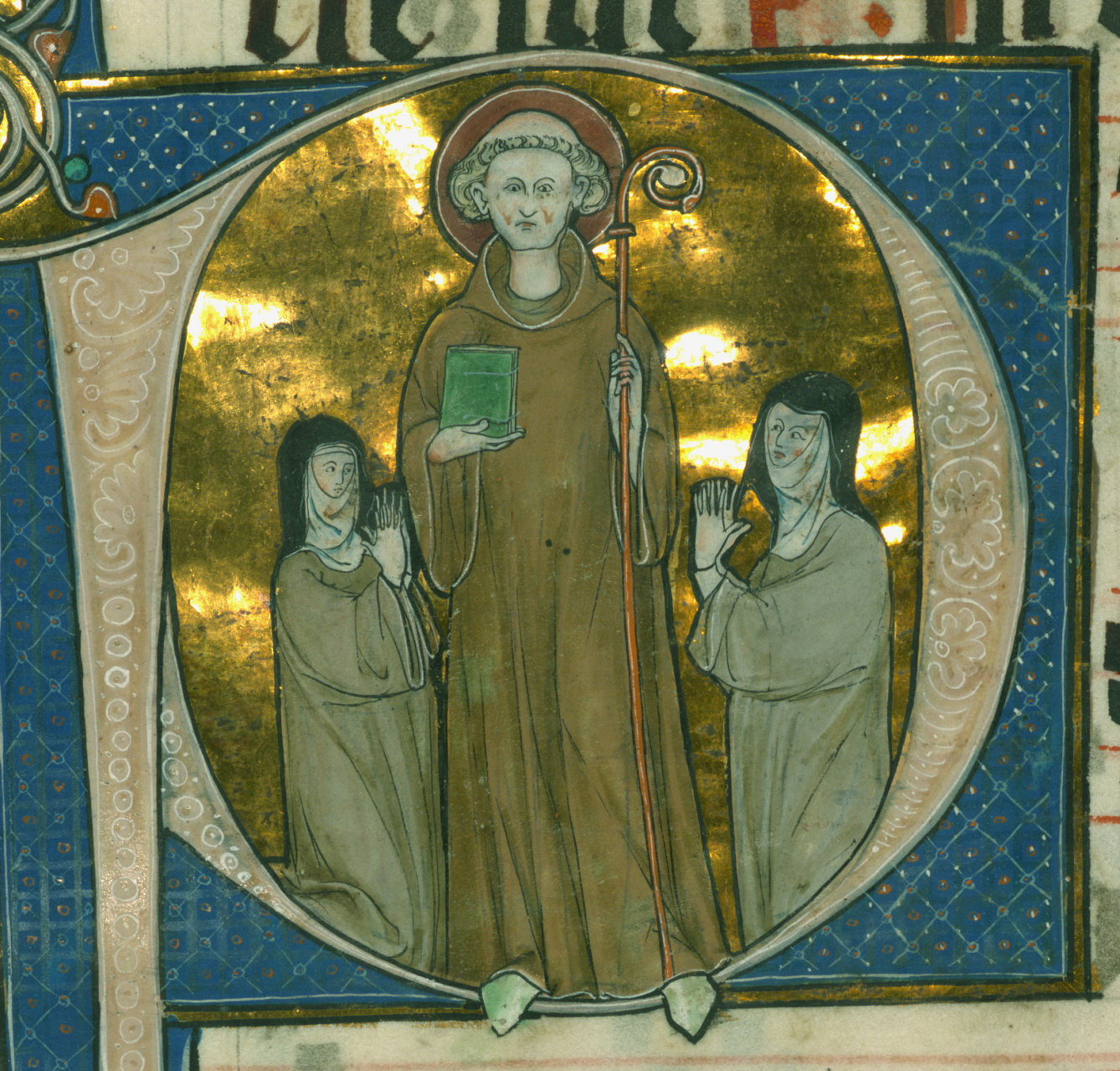
A 13th-century depiction of Bernard of Clairvaux, with whom Stephen argued over ecclesiastical policy

Stephen's relationship with the church deteriorated badly towards the end of his reign. The reforming movement within the church, which advocated greater autonomy from royal authority for the clergy, had continued to grow, while new voices such as the Cistercians had gained additional prestige within the monastic orders, eclipsing older orders such as the Cluniacs. Stephen's dispute with the church had its origins in 1140 when Archbishop Thurstan of York died. An argument then broke out between a group of reformers based in York and backed by Bernard of Clairvaux, the head of the Cistercian order, who preferred William of Rievaulx as the new archbishop, and Stephen and his brother Henry, who preferred various Blois family relatives. The row between Henry and Bernard grew increasingly personal, and Henry used his authority as legate to appoint his nephew William of York to the post in 1141 only to find that, when Pope Innocent II died in 1143, Bernard was able to get the appointment rejected by Rome. Bernard then convinced Pope Eugene III to overturn Henry's decision altogether in 1147, deposing William, and appointing Henry Murdac as archbishop instead.

Stephen was furious over what he saw as potentially precedent-setting papal interference in his royal authority and initially refused to allow Murdac into England. When Theobald, the Archbishop of Canterbury, went to consult with the Pope on the matter against Stephen's wishes, the King refused to allow him back into England either and seized his estates. Stephen also cut his links to the Cistercian order and turned instead to the Cluniacs, of which Henry of Blois was a member.

Nonetheless, the pressure on Stephen to get Eustace confirmed as his legitimate heir continued to grow. The King gave Eustace the County of Boulogne in 1147, but it remained unclear whether Eustace would inherit England. Stephen's preferred option was to have Eustace crowned while he himself was still alive, as was the custom in France, but this was not the normal practice in England, and Celestine II, during his brief tenure as pope between 1143 and 1144, had banned any change to this practice. Since the only person who could crown Eustace was Archbishop Theobald, who refused to do so without agreement from the current pope, Eugene III, the matter reached an impasse. (Note: Historian Keith Stringer argues that Theobald was also probably thinking about an eventual peace treaty in England involving Henry FitzEmpress and that he may have seen the coronation of Eustace only as a guarantee of further civil war after Stephen's death.) At the end of 1148, Stephen and Theobald came to a temporary compromise that allowed Theobald to return to England. Theobald was appointed a papal legate in 1151, adding to his authority. Stephen then made a fresh attempt to have Eustace crowned at Easter 1152, gathering his nobles to swear fealty to Eustace, and then insisting that Theobald and his bishops anoint him king. When Theobald refused yet again, Stephen and Eustace imprisoned both him and the bishops and refused to release them unless they agreed to crown Eustace. Theobald escaped again into temporary exile in Flanders, pursued to the coast by Stephen's knights, marking a low point in Stephen's relationship with the church.

=== Treaties and peace (1153–1154) ===
A political map of England, Wales and southern Scotland in 1153; Under Henry's control Stephen Indigenous Welsh Ranulf of Chester and Robert de Beaumont David I of Scotland

Henry FitzEmpress returned to England again at the start of 1153 with a small army, supported in the north and east of England by Ranulf of Chester and Hugh Bigod. Stephen's castle at Malmesbury was besieged by Henry's forces, and the King responded by marching west with an army to relieve it. He unsuccessfully attempted to force Henry's smaller army to fight a decisive battle along the river Avon. In the face of the increasingly wintry weather, Stephen agreed to a temporary truce and returned to London, leaving Henry to travel north through the Midlands where the powerful Robert de Beaumont, Earl of Leicester, announced his support for the Angevin cause. Despite only modest military successes, Henry and his allies now controlled the south-west, the Midlands and much of the north of England.

Over the summer, Stephen intensified the long-running siege of Wallingford Castle in a final attempt to take this major Angevin stronghold. The fall of Wallingford appeared imminent and Henry marched south in an attempt to relieve the siege, arriving with a small army and placing Stephen's besieging forces under siege themselves. Upon news of this, Stephen gathered up a large force and marched from Oxford, and the two sides confronted each other across the River Thames at Wallingford in July. By this point in the war, the barons on both sides seem to have been eager to avoid an open battle. As a result, instead of a battle ensuing, members of the church brokered a truce, to the annoyance of both Stephen and Henry.

In the aftermath of Wallingford, Stephen and Henry spoke together privately about a potential end to the war; Stephen's son Eustace, however, was furious about the peaceful outcome at Wallingford. He left his father and returned home to Cambridge to gather more funds for a fresh campaign, where he fell ill and died the next month. Eustace's death removed an obvious claimant to the throne and was politically convenient for those seeking a permanent peace in England. It is possible that Stephen had already begun to consider passing over Eustace's claim. Historian Edmund King observes that Eustace's claim to the throne was not mentioned in the discussions at Wallingford, for example, and this may have added to his anger.

Fighting continued after Wallingford but in a rather half-hearted fashion. Stephen lost the towns of Oxford and Stamford to Henry while the King was diverted fighting Hugh Bigod in the east of England, but Nottingham Castle survived an Angevin attempt to capture it. Meanwhile, Henry of Blois and Theobald of Canterbury were for once unified in an effort to broker a permanent peace between the two sides, putting pressure on Stephen to accept a deal. The two armies met again at Winchester, where the leaders ratified the terms of a permanent peace in November.

Stephen announced the Treaty of Winchester in Winchester Cathedral: he recognised Henry as his adopted son and successor, in return for Henry doing homage to him; Stephen promised to listen to Henry's advice, but retained all his royal powers; Stephen's remaining son, William, would do homage to Henry and renounce his claim to the throne, in exchange for promises of the security of his lands; key royal castles would be held on Henry's behalf by guarantors, whilst Stephen would have access to Henry's castles; and the numerous foreign mercenaries would be demobilised and sent home. Stephen and Henry sealed the treaty with a kiss of peace in the cathedral.

== Death ==
Stephen's decision to recognise Henry as his heir was, at the time, not necessarily a final solution to the civil war. Despite the issuing of new currency and administrative reforms, Stephen might potentially have lived for many more years, whilst Henry's position on the continent was far from secure. Although Stephen's son William was unprepared to challenge Henry for the throne in 1153, the situation could well have shifted in subsequent years – there were widespread rumours during 1154 that William planned to assassinate Henry, for example. Historian Graham White describes the treaty of Winchester as a "precarious peace", in line with the judgement of most modern historians that the situation in late 1153 was still uncertain and unpredictable.

Many problems remained to be resolved, including re-establishing royal authority over the provinces and resolving the complex issue of which barons should control the contested lands and estates after the long civil war. Stephen burst into activity in early 1154, travelling around the kingdom extensively. He began issuing royal writs for the south-west of England once again and travelled to York where he held a major court in an attempt to impress upon the northern barons that royal authority was being reasserted. After a busy summer in 1154, Stephen travelled to Dover to meet Thierry, Count of Flanders. Some historians believe that the King was already ill and preparing to settle his family affairs. Stephen fell ill with a stomach disease and died on 25 October at the local priory, being buried at Faversham Abbey with his wife Matilda and son Eustace.

== Legacy ==
=== Aftermath ===
After Stephen's death, Henry II succeeded to the throne of England. Henry vigorously re-established royal authority in the aftermath of the civil war, dismantling castles and increasing revenues, although several of these trends had begun under Stephen. The destruction of castles under Henry was not as dramatic as once thought, and although he restored royal revenues, the economy of England remained broadly unchanged under both rulers. Stephen's son William was confirmed as the Earl of Surrey by Henry, and prospered under the new regime, with the occasional point of tension with Henry.

Stephen's daughter Marie I, Countess of Boulogne, also survived her father; she had been placed in a convent by Stephen, but after his death, she left and married. Stephen's middle son, Baldwin, and second daughter, Matilda, had died before 1147 and were buried at Holy Trinity Priory. Stephen probably had three illegitimate sons, Gervase, Ralph and Americ, by his mistress Damette. Gervase became abbot of Westminster in 1138. After his father's death he was removed by Henry in 1157 and died shortly afterwards.

=== Historiography ===
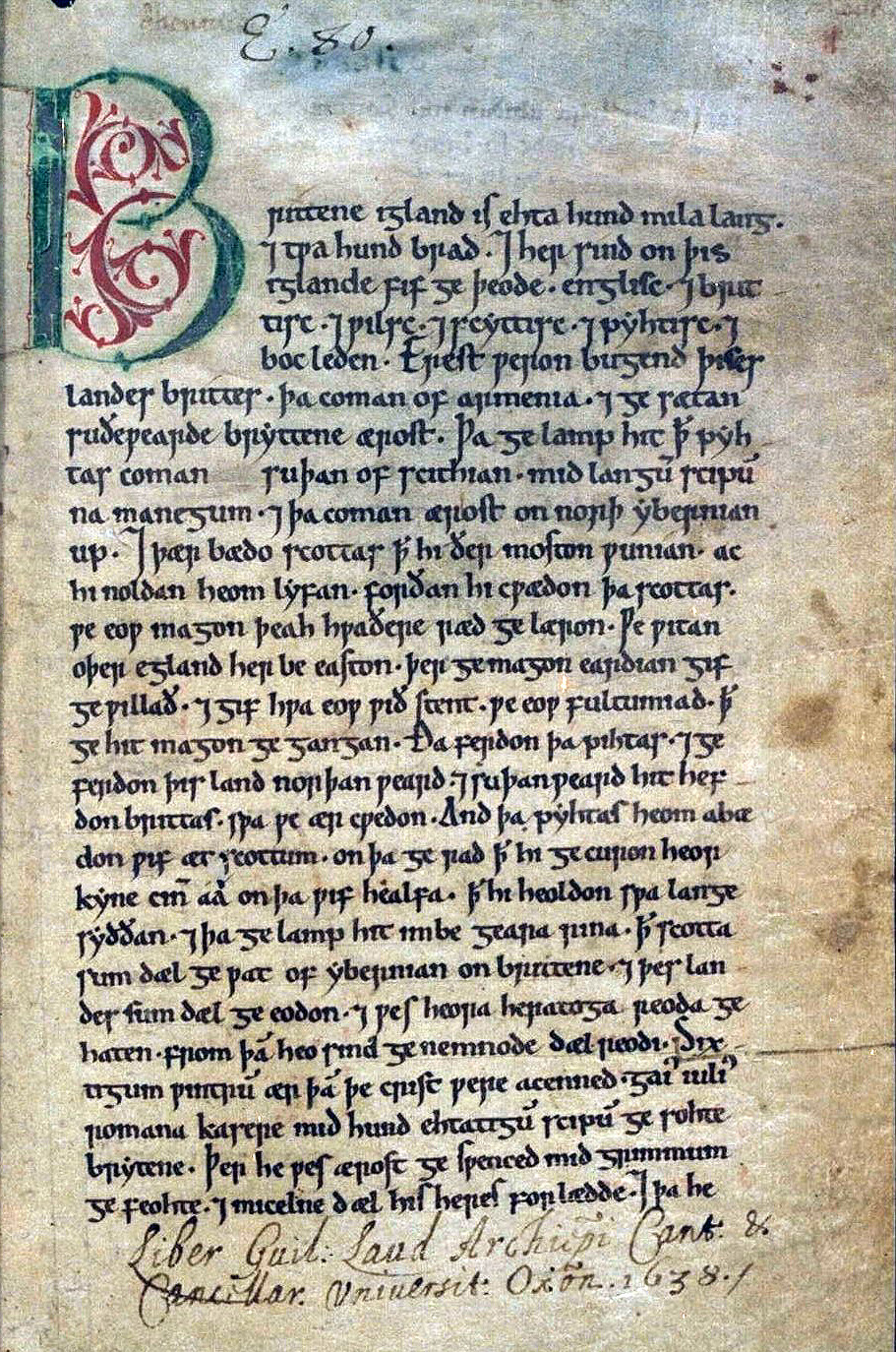
The first page of the Peterborough element of the Anglo-Saxon Chronicle, written around 1150, which details the events of Stephen's reign

Much of the modern history of Stephen's reign is based on accounts of chroniclers who lived in, or close to, the middle of the 12th century, forming a relatively rich account of the period. All of the main chronicler accounts carry significant regional biases in how they portray the disparate events. Several of the key chronicles were written in the south-west of England, including the Gesta Stephani, or "Acts of Stephen", and William of Malmesbury's Historia Novella, or "New History". In Normandy, Orderic Vitalis wrote his Ecclesiastical History, covering Stephen's reign until 1141, and Robert of Torigni wrote a later history of the rest of the period.

Henry of Huntingdon, who lived in the east of England, produced the Historia Anglorum that provides a regional account of the reign. The Anglo-Saxon Chronicle was past its prime by the time of Stephen but is remembered for its striking account of conditions during "the Anarchy". Most of the chronicles carry some bias for or against Stephen, Robert of Gloucester or other key figures in the conflict. Those writing for the church after the events of Stephen's later reign, such as John of Salisbury for example, paint the King as a tyrant due to his argument with the Archbishop of Canterbury; by contrast, clerics in Durham regarded Stephen as a saviour, due to his contribution to the defeat of the Scots at the Battle of the Standard. Later chronicles written during the reign of Henry II were generally more negative: Walter Map, for example, described Stephen as "a fine knight, but in other respects almost a fool". A number of charters were issued during Stephen's reign, often giving details of current events or daily routine, and these have become widely used as sources by modern historians.

Historians in the "Whiggish" tradition that emerged during the Victorian era traced a progressive and universalist course of political and economic development in England over the medieval period. William Stubbs focused on these constitutional aspects of Stephen's reign in his 1874 volume the Constitutional History of England, beginning an enduring interest in Stephen and his reign. Stubbs's analysis, focusing on the disorder of the period, influenced his student John Horace Round to coin the term "the Anarchy" to describe the period, a label that, whilst sometimes critiqued, continues to be used today. (Note: Jim Bradbury provides an accessible summary of the argument as to the extent of "the Anarchy".) The late-Victorian scholar Frederic William Maitland also introduced the possibility that Stephen's reign marked a turning point in English legal history—the so-called "tenurial crisis".

Stephen remains a popular subject for historical study: David Crouch suggests that after King John he is "arguably the most written-about medieval king of England". Modern historians vary in their assessments of Stephen as a king. Historian R. H. C. Davis's influential biography paints a picture of a weak king: a capable military leader in the field, full of activity and pleasant, but "beneath the surface ... mistrustful and sly", with a poor strategic judgement that ultimately undermined his reign.

Stephen's lack of sound policy judgement and his mishandling of international affairs, leading to the loss of Normandy and his consequent inability to win the civil war in England, are also highlighted by another of his biographers, David Crouch. Historian and biographer Edmund King, whilst painting a slightly more positive picture than Davis, also concludes that Stephen, while a stoic, pious and genial leader, was also rarely, if ever, his own man, usually relying upon stronger characters such as his wife Matilda and brother Henry. Historian Keith Stringer provides a more positive portrayal of Stephen, arguing that his ultimate failure as king was the result of external pressures on the Norman state, rather than the result of personal failings.

=== Popular representations ===
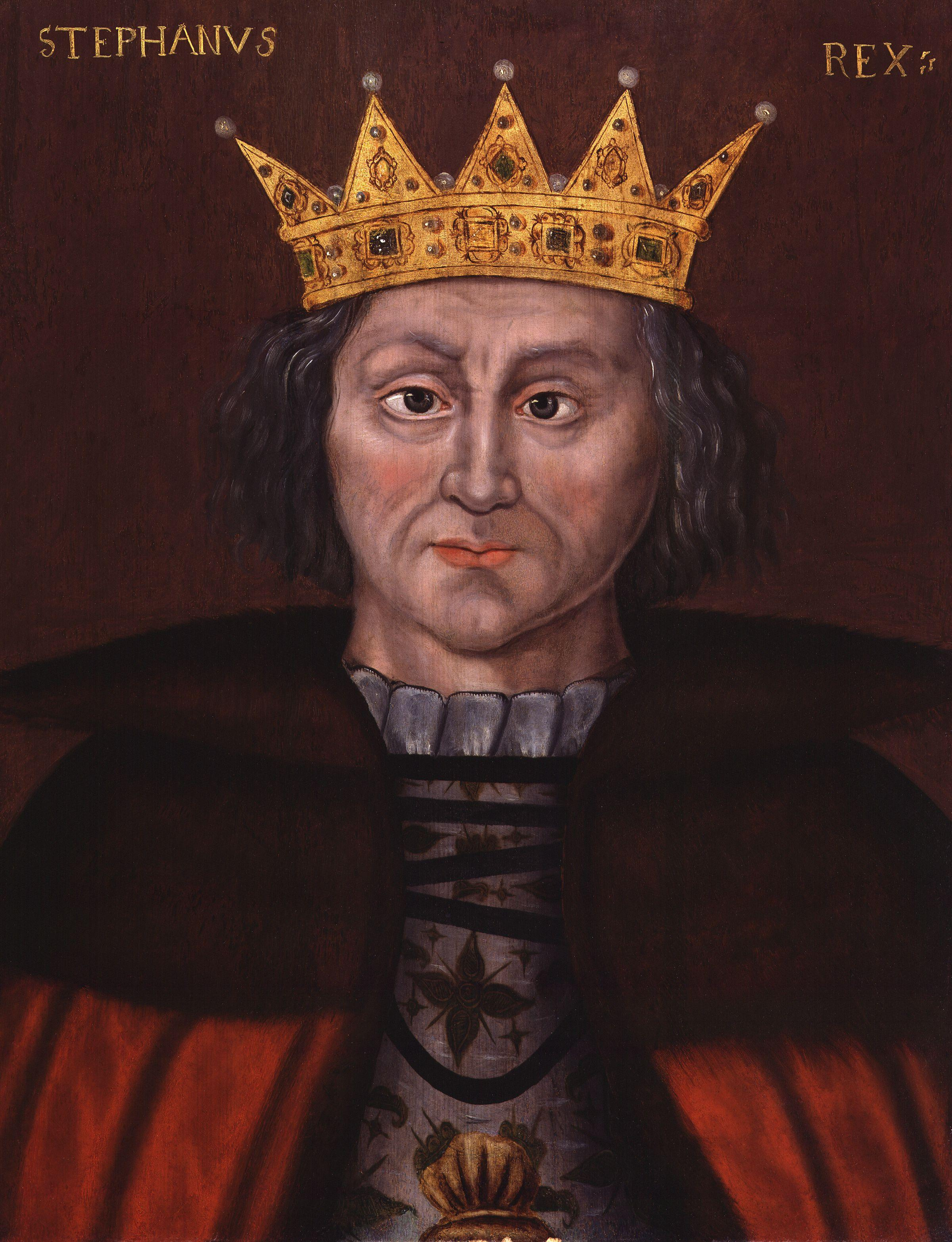
Stephen, as imagined by a non-contemporary unknown artist, about 1620

Stephen and his reign have been occasionally used in historical fiction. Stephen and his supporters appear in Ellis Peters's historical detective series The Cadfael Chronicles, set between 1137 and 1145. Peters's depiction of Stephen's reign is an essentially local narrative, focused on the town of Shrewsbury and its environs. Peters paints Stephen as a tolerant man and a reasonable ruler, despite his execution of the Shrewsbury defenders after the taking of the city in 1138. In contrast, he is depicted unsympathetically in both Ken Follett's historical novel The Pillars of the Earth and the TV mini-series adapted from it.

== Issue ==
Stephen of Blois married Matilda of Boulogne in 1125. Their children were

1. Baldwin (c. 1132 - before 1147)
2. Matilda (c. 1133 - before 1147)
3. Eustace IV, Count of Boulogne (c. 1130 – 1153)
4. William I, Count of Boulogne (c. 1135 – 1159)
5. Marie I, Countess of Boulogne (c. 1128 – 1182)

Stephen had an illegitimate son, Gervase, Abbot of Westminster, by his mistress Dametta.

== Genealogical chart ==
William the Conqueror	Matilda of Flanders
Robert Curthose	William II of England	Henry I of England	Adela of Normandy	Stephen-Henry of Blois
William Clito	William Adelin	Empress Matilda	Robert of Gloucester	Theobald II of Champagne	Stephen of England	Henry of Blois
Henry II of England

Norman English and early Plantagenet monarchs and their relationship with rulers of Western Europe
: Red borders indicate English monarchs
: Bold borders indicate legitimate children of English monarchs

Baldwin II; King of Jerusalem	Fulk IV; Count of Anjou	Bertrade	Philip I King of France	William the Conqueror; King of England r. 1066–1087	Margaret	Malcolm III; King of Scotland
Melisende; Queen of Jerusalem	Fulk V King of Jerusalem	Eremburga; Countess of Maine	Robert Curthose	William II; King of England r. 1087–1100	Adela	Henry I King of England r. 1100–1135	Edith/Matilda	Duncan II; King of Scotland	Edgar; King of Scotland	Alexander I King of Scotland	David I King of Scotland
Sibylla	William Clito	Stephen; King of England r. 1135–1154	Geoffrey Plantagenet; Count of Anjou	Empress Matilda	Henry V Holy Roman Emperor	William Adelin; Duke of Normandy	Matilda	Sybilla	Henry
Margaret	Philip of Alsace; Count of Flanders	Louis VII; King of France	Eleanor	Henry II; King of England r. 1154–1189	Geoffrey; Count of Nantes	William FitzEmpress; Viscount of Dieppe	Malcolm IV; King of Scotland	William the Lion; King of Scotland
Baldwin I Latin Emperor, Count of Flanders, and Count of Hainaut	Isabella	Philip II; King of France	Henry	Matilda	Richard I King of England r. 1189–1199	Geoffrey II; Duke of Brittany	Eleanor	Alfonso VIII; King of Castile	Joan	William II; King of Sicily	John; King of England r. 1199–1216
Louis VIII; King of France	Otto IV; Holy Roman Emperor	Arthur I Duke of Brittany	Blanche	Henry III; King of England r. 1216–1272	Richard of Cornwall; King of the Romans	Joan	Alexander II; King of Scotland

== Bibliography ==
- Amt, Emilie. (1993) The Accession of Henry II in England: Royal Government Restored, 1149–1159. Woodbridge, UK: Boydell Press. ISBN 9780851153483.
- Barlow, Frank. (1999) The Feudal Kingdom of England, 1042–1216. (5th edition) Harlow, UK: Pearson Education. ISBN 0582381177.
- Bennett, Matthew. (2000) "The Impact of 'Foreign' Troops in the Civil Wars of Stephen's Reign," in Dunn, Diana E. S. (ed) (2000) War and society in medieval and early modern Britain. Liverpool: Liverpool University Press. ISBN 9780853238850.
- Blackburn, Mark. (1998) "Coinage and Currency," in King, Edmund. (ed) (1998) The Anarchy of King Stephen's Reign. Oxford: Clarendon Press. ISBN 0198203640.
- Bradbury, Jim. (2009) Stephen and Matilda: the Civil War of 1139–53. Stroud, UK: The History Press. ISBN 9780750937931.
- Carpenter, David. (2004) Struggle for Mastery: The Penguin History of Britain 1066–1284. London: Penguin. ISBN 9780140148244.
- Chibnall, Marjorie. (2008) "Introduction," in Dalton, Paul and Graeme J. White. (eds) (2008) King Stephen's reign (1135–1154). Woodbridge, UK: Boydell Press. ISBN 9781843833611.
- Coulson, Charles. (1994) "The Castles of the Anarchy," in King, Edmund. (ed) (1998) The Anarchy of King Stephen's Reign. Oxford: Clarendon Press. ISBN 0198203640.
- Coss, Peter. (2002) "From Feudalism to Bastard Feudalism," in Fryde, Natalie, Pierre Monnet and Oto Oexle. (eds) (2002) Die Gegenwart des Feudalismus. Göttingen, Germany: Vandenhoeck and Ruprecht. ISBN 9783525353912.
- Crouch, David. (1998) "The March and the Welsh Kings," in King, Edmund. (ed) (1998) The Anarchy of King Stephen's Reign. Oxford: Clarendon Press. ISBN 0198203640.
- Crouch, David. (2002) The Normans: The History of a Dynasty. London: Hambledon Continuum. ISBN 9781852855956.
- Crouch, David. (2008a) The Beaumont Twins: The Roots and Branches of Power in the Twelfth Century. Cambridge: Cambridge University Press. ISBN 9780521090131.
- Crouch, David. (2008b) "King Stephen and Northern France," in Dalton, Paul and Graeme J. White. (eds) (2008) King Stephen's reign (1135–1154). Woodbridge, UK: Boydell Press. ISBN 9781843833611.
- Davis, R. H. C. (1977) King Stephen. (1st edition) London: Longman. ISBN 0582487277.
- Duby, Georges. (1993) France in the Middle Ages 987–1460: from Hugh Capet to Joan of Arc. Oxford: Blackwell. ISBN 9780631189459.
- Dyer, Christopher. (2009) Making a Living in the Middle Ages: The People of Britain, 850 – 1520. London: Yale University Press. ISBN 9780300101911.
- Fryde, Natalie, Pierre Monnet and Oto Oexle. (eds) (2002) Die Gegenwart des Feudalismus. Göttingen, Germany: Vandenhoeck and Ruprecht. ISBN 9783525353912.
- Garnett, George and John Hudson. (eds) (1994) Law and Government in Medieval England and Normandy: Essays in Honour of Sir James Holt. Cambridge: Cambridge University Press. ISBN 9780521430760.
- Gillingham, John. (1994) "1066 and the Introduction of Chivalry into England," in Garnett, George and John Hudson. (eds) (1994) Law and Government in Medieval England and Normandy: Essays in Honour of Sir James Holt. Cambridge: Cambridge University Press. ISBN 9780521430760.
- Green, J. A. (1992) "Financing Stephen's War," Anglo-Norman Studies 14, pp. 91–114.
- Helmerichs, Robert. (2001) "'Ad tutandos partriae fines': The Defense of Normandy, 1135," in Abels, Richard Philip and Bernard S. Bachrach. (eds) (2001) The Normans and Their Adversaries at War. Woodbridge, UK: Boydell Press. ISBN 9780851158471.
- Holt, J. C. (1998) "1153: The Treaty of Westminster," in King, Edmund. (ed) (1998) The Anarchy of King Stephen's Reign. Oxford: Clarendon Press. ISBN 0198203640.
- Huscroft, Richard. (2005) Ruling England, 1042–1217. Harlow, UK: Pearson. ISBN 0582848822.
- Kadish, Alon. (1989) Historians, Economists, and Economic History. London: Routledge. ISBN 9780415613880.
- King, Edmund. (2006) "The Gesta Stephani," in Bates, David, Julia C. Crick and Sarah Hamilton. (eds) (2006) Writing Medieval Biography, 750–1250: Essays in Honour of Professor Frank Barlow. Woodbridge, UK: Boydell Press. ISBN 9781843832621.
- King, Edmumd. (2010) King Stephen. New Haven, US: Yale University Press. ISBN 9780300112238.
- Koziol, Geoffrey. (1992) Begging Pardon and Favor: Ritual and Political Order in Early Medieval France. New York: Cornell University. ISBN 9780801423697.
- Mason, Emma. (1996) Westminster Abbey and its people, c.1050-c.1216. Woodbridge, UK: Boydell Press. ISBN 9780851153964.
- Pettifer, Adrian. (1995) English Castles: A Guide by Counties. Woodbridge, UK: Boydell Press. ISBN 9780851157825.
- Ramet, Carlos. (1999) Ken Follett: the transformation of a writer. Bowling Green, US: Bowling Green State University Popular Press. ISBN 9780879727987.
- Rielly, Edward J. (2000) "Ellis Peters: Brother Cadfael," in Browne, Ray Broadus and Lawrence A. Kreiser. (eds) (2000) The Detective as Historian: History and Art in Historical Crime. Bowling Green, US: Bowling Green State University Press. ISBN 9780879728151.
- Round, John H. (1888) "Danegeld and the Finance of Domesday," in Dove, P. E. (ed) (1888) Domesday Studies. London: Longmans, Green, and Co. OCLC 25186487.
- Stringer, Keith J. (1993) The Reign of Stephen: Kingship, Warfare and Government in Twelfth-Century England. London: Routledge. ISBN 9780415014151.
- Stubbs, William. (1874) The Constitutional History of England, I. Oxford: Clarendon Press. OCLC 2653225.
- Thompson, Kathleen. (2002) Power and Border Lordship in Medieval France: the County of the Perche, 1000–1226. Woodbridge, UK: Boydell Press. ISBN 9780861932542.
- Turner, Richard Charles. Ken Follett: A Critical Companion. Westport, US: Greenwood Press. ISBN 9780313294150.
- Tyerman, Christopher. (2007) God's War: a New History of the Crusades. London: Penguin. ISBN 9780140269802.
- White, Graeme. (1990) "The End of Stephen's Reign," History, LXXV, pp. 3–22.
- White, Graeme. (1998) "Continuity in Government," in King, Edmund. (ed) (1998) The Anarchy of King Stephen's Reign. Oxford: Clarendon Press. ISBN 0198203640.
- White, Graeme. (2000) "Earls and Earldoms during King Stephen's Reign," in Dunn, Diana E. S. (ed) (2000) War and society in medieval and early modern Britain. Liverpool: Liverpool University Press. ISBN 9780853238850.
- White, Graeme. (2008) "Royal Income and Regional Trends," in Dalton, Paul and Graeme J. White. (eds) (2008) King Stephen's reign (1135–1154). Woodbridge, UK: Boydell Press. ISBN 9781843833611.
- Yoshitake, Kenji. (1988) "The Arrest of the Bishops in 1139 and its Consequences," Journal of Medieval History, 14, pp. 97–114.

Stephen, King of England House of Blois Born: 1092/6 Died: 25 October 1154
Regnal titles
Preceded by Henry I	King of England; 1135–1154	Succeeded by Henry II
Preceded by Henry I	Duke of Normandy; 1135–1144	Succeeded by Geoffrey
Preceded by Eustace III	Count of Boulogne; 1125–1147 with Matilda I	Succeeded by Eustace IV
