= Gervase of Blois =

12th-century Abbot of Westminster Abbey

Gervase of Blois was the abbot of Westminster in England between 1138 and around 1157. Historically, Gervase has a bad reputation for mismanaging the abbey, although modern historians have re-evaluated his performance as abbot.

Gervase of Blois was the illegitimate son of King Stephen and his mistress, Damette. His father ensured that he was appointed as the abbot of Westminster Abbey in the second half of 1138; the abbey would have hoped to receive additional royal funding as a result. Gervase was very young to be appointed abbot, but despite this probably attended the Second Lateran Council the following year. Working with the Prior Osbert of Clare, Gervase unsuccessfully attempted to have King Edward the Confessor canonized; the abbey held the remains of the king which would have brought in valuable pilgrims had he been canonised.

Pope Innocent II ordered Gervase to reform the estate management of the abbey; historians have disagreed over the years about whether the Pope was referring to long-standing issues of malpractice, or ones that had appeared during his term of office. Pope Eugene III appears to have thought Gervase a reasonable abbot, granting the abbey privileges in the 1140s, and Gervase got on well with his fellow senior clergy.

In 1154, however, Stephen died, being replaced by his former rival, King Henry II, putting Gervase's position at risk. Gervase was accused by Henry of mishandling the abbey's estates and he was dismissed from post in 1157, albeit without trial, dying shortly afterwards. He was replaced by Master Laurence from Durham, a supporter of the new king.

== Bibliography ==
- Barlow, Frank. (1970) Edward the Confessor. Berkeley: University of California Press. ISBN 978-0-520-01671-2
- Mason, Emma. (1996) Westminster Abbey and its People, c.1050-c.1216. Woodbridge, UK: Boydell Press. ISBN 978-0-85115-396-4

Gervase of Blois House of Blois
Catholic Church titles
Preceded by Herbert	Abbot of Westminster; 1138 – c. 1157	Succeeded by Laurence
