= Charles III, Duke of Bourbon =

French general and nobleman (1490–1527)

Charles de Bourbon
- Count of Montpensier; Duke of Bourbon
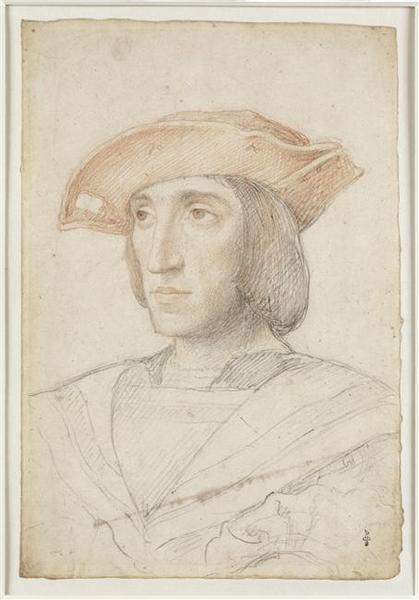
- Possible drawing of Charles de Bourbon by Jean Clouet c. 1520
- Born: 17 February 1490
- Died: 6 May 1527 (aged 37); Rome, Papal States
- Spouse: Suzanne, Duchess of Bourbon (m. 1505; died 1521)
- House: Bourbon-Montpensier
- Father: Gilbert de Bourbon, comte de Montpensier
- Mother: Clara Gonzaga
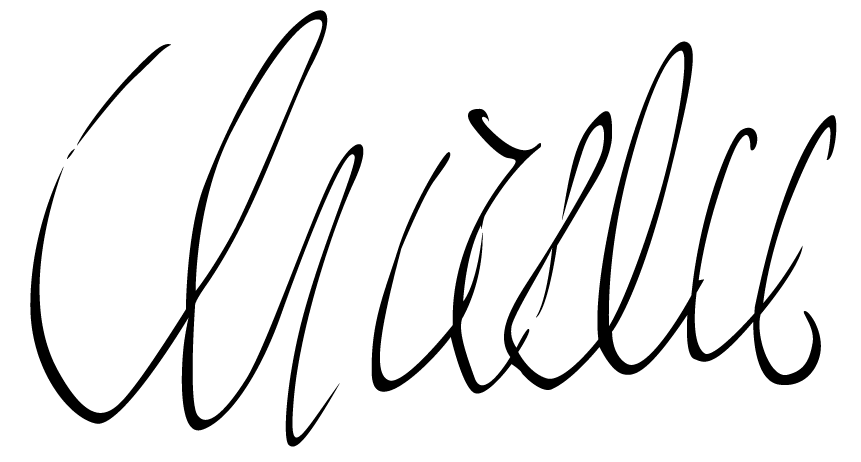
- Signature

Charles III de Bourbon, Count de Montpensier, then Duke of Bourbon (17 February 1490 – 6 May 1527) was a French military commander, governor, prince of the royal blood and rebel during the early Italian Wars. The son of Gilbert de Bourbon and Clara Gonzaga, he was born into a junior branch of the royal house of France. The early death of his father and elder brother meant that he became the comte de Montpensier (count of Montpensier) in 1501. He then secured a very advantageous marriage in 1505 to Suzanne de Bourbon, the heiress to the senior line of the house of Bourbon. By this means he became the greatest feudal lord in the French kingdom. He participated in the expeditions of king Louis XII seeing combat at Genoa in 1507 and at the famous battle of Agnadello in 1509. In 1512, he was established as the governor of Languedoc, and in the final years of Louis XII's reign he would fight the Spanish in Navarre and the English in Picardy.

With the death of Louis XII in 1515, he would receive great honour from his successor Francis I when he was established as the Constable of France, the greatest office of the crown, which made him the head of the royal army. Francis was keen to see the French reconquer the duchy of Milan and undertook a campaign to this end in the first year of his reign. The duc de Bourbon (duke of Bourbon) had a key role to play in this campaign, leading the royal vanguard in the victory of Marignano. With Milan reconquered, Bourbon was established as the military governor of the duchy, though he would only hold this charge until May 1516. Back in France, Bourbon had limited involvement in the affairs of the next few years, joining the King for various occasions. At this time he and Suzanne were attempting to produce an heir, but their children all died young.

In 1521, France entered war with the Holy Roman Empire which was led by the young new emperor Charles V. In the campaign on the northern frontier of the kingdom, Bourbon was denied the role of commander of the vanguard which was his by right, embittering him. During this year, his wife Suzanne also died. This created two crises of relations with the French crown, the one because of his plans for remarriage, the other because of her extensive inheritance, which she had willed to him. King Francis, and his mother Louise disputed her will, arguing the inheritance rightfully defaulted to them. A lengthy legal battle began, which was prejudiced when Francis accepted his mother doing homage for most of the lands that were disputed. In August 1523, all the disputed lands were sequestered from Bourbon. Concurrent to this legal battle, Bourbon began exploring betraying the French crown in favour of service to Charles V, entering a treaty with the Emperor in July 1523. With the sequestering of his lands, Bourbon broke with the French crown and fled the French kingdom, joining with the Imperial commanders in Italy.

Now a commander for the Holy Roman Emperor, Bourbon helped rebuff a new French attempt to secure Milan in 1523. He then followed this up by leading an invasion of the French province of Provence, though this invasion stalled out before the walls of Marseille and he was forced to retreat back into Italy. The royal French army pursued him into the peninsula, but was delivered a crushing defeat at the battle of Pavia at which Bourbon fought, and at which the French king was made prisoner. Bourbon and Charles V looked to extract heavy concessions from the French, with Bourbon hoping to gain a marriage with the sister of the Emperor Eleanor, regain all his lands in France as a sovereign lord, and be made the comte de Provence.

The treaty of Madrid would grant him some of these concessions but not all, and upon his release, Francis would honour none of the concessions made to the duc de Bourbon. Instead, the French king entered into a new alliance to oppose the Holy Roman Emperor known as the league of Cognac. Bourbon took charge of the effort to combat this league in Italy. He conquered Milan for the Emperor, who had offered to make him the duke of Milan and then led a mutinous army south to Rome which he put to siege on 6 May 1527. He would be killed trying to scale the walls, but the city was successfully taken, and subject to a brutal sack. After his death, he was posthumously declared guilty of various crimes in France. The legal dispute over the lands confiscated from him would not be entirely settled until the reign of Charles IX over thirty years later.

== Family and personal life ==
=== Parentage and siblings ===
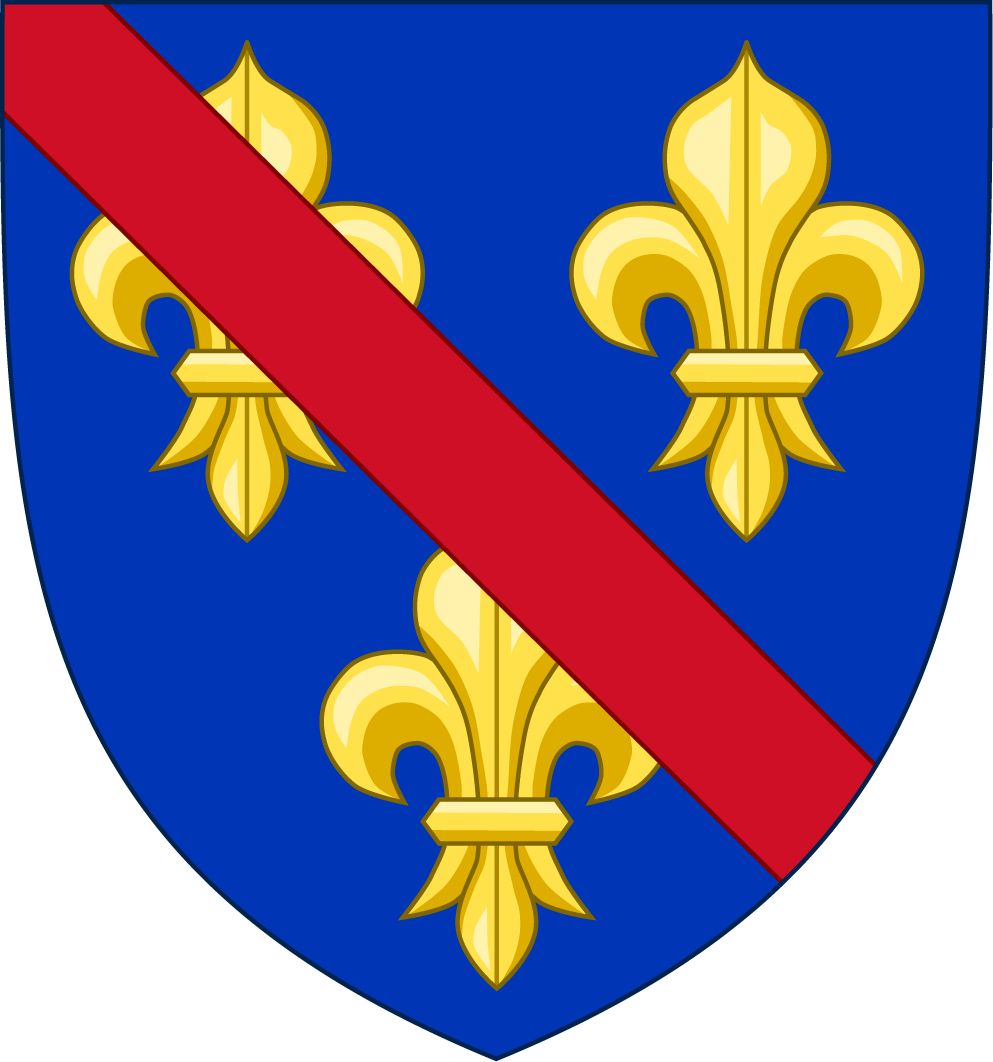
Bourbon coat of arms

Charles de Bourbon was born on 17 February 1490, the son of Gilbert de Bourbon, the comte de Montpensier (count of Montpensier) and Clara Gonzaga. Charles' father Gilbert would serve as the French viceroy of Naples for the king Charles VIII but would die of the plague after his army was forced to surrender in November 1496. Through his mother Clara, Charles was the grandson of the marquis of Mantua, ruler of an Italian polity. Gilbert and Clara had married in 1481.

Charles was the second son of the marriage. His elder brother Louis de Bourbon, succeeded their father as comte de Montpensier before his early death in August 1501. He also had a younger brother, François de Bourbon, who would become duc de Châtellerault before his early death in 1515. Charles also had an elder sister Louise de Bourbon who would live until 1561 and who married the prince de La Roche-sur-Yon. Their union would form the foundation of the second house of Bourbon-Montpensier after the extinction of the first with the death of Charles in 1527. Another sister of Charles, Renée would marry the duc de Lorraine in 1515, thereby binding the house of Bourbon with that of Lorraine.

=== House of Bourbon ===
The House of Bourbon descended from Robert de Bourbon, comte de Clermont, a younger son of king Louis IX. Several branches of the Bourbon family existed at the start of the sixteenth-century: the Bourbon-Beaujeu (otherwise known as Bourbon proper) which became extinct with the death of Suzanne de Bourbon, Charles' wife, in 1521, the Bourbon-Montpensier (of which Charles de Bourbon was a member) and the Bourbon-Vendôme.

As an agnatic (through the male line) descendant of Louis IX, Charles de Bourbon was a prince du sang (prince of the royal blood). This term denoted legitimate direct male descendants of the French king Hugh Capet through the male line, i.e. if a daughter of the King had a son, that son would not be a prince du sang. During Charles' lifetime the primacy of the concept of the prince du sang was not yet without competing conceptions of French royalty, and it would not be until 1560 that it was definitively established. At the birth of Charles de Bourbon in 1490, the royal house of France was the direct house of Valois. There were several cadet houses of Valois. The last direct Valois king, Charles VIII would die in 1498 without a son and would therefore be succeeded by the head of the cadet branch of the Valois-Orléans, the duc d'Orléans who took the regnal name Louis XII. Louis XII would also fail to produce a male heir, and thus the Valois-Orléans in turn became extinct in 1515 upon his death and the line of Valois-Angoulême unified with the crown in the figure of the comte d'Angoulême who took the throne as Francis I (otherwise known as François I). The final cadet branch of the Valois was the Valois-Alençon whose last head, the duc d'Alençon, premier prince du sang (first prince of the blood) during the reign of Francis I, died without children in 1525.^{α}

=== Unification of Montpensier and Bourbon ===
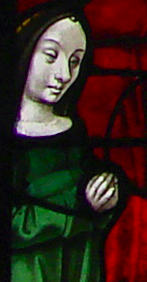
Suzanne de Bourbon, wife of Charles de Bourbon and heir to the line of Bourbon-Beaujeu

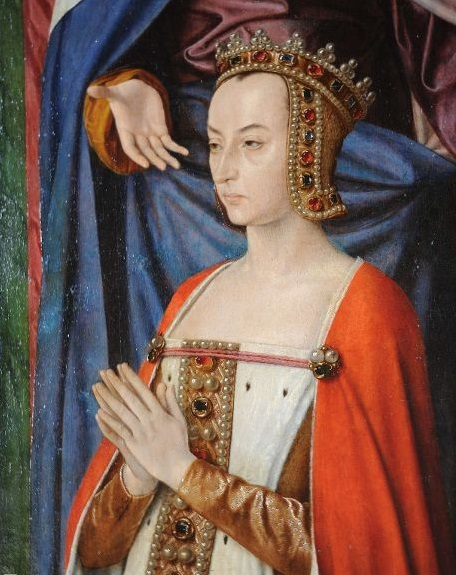
Anne de Valois, duchesse de Bourbon, mother of Suzanne and dowager-duchesse de Bourbon

Shortly after the ascension to the throne of Louis XII, on 12 May 1498, the new king assured Pierre II, the duc de Bourbon (head of the house of Bourbon-Beaujeu), he would be able to transmit the rights to all his extensive territories to his daughter and heiress Suzanne who would in turn be able to pass those rights on to her children. This included royal appanage lands like the duché d'Auvergne (duchy of Auvergne) and the comté de Clermont-en-Beauvaisis (county of Clermont-en-Beauvaisis) which would have otherwise reverted to the crown in the absence of a male heir. By this means, ill feeling between king Louis and the duchesse de Bourbon might be quashed, and the Bourbon family rallied to the crown. This was a matter of importance as the new king looked to annul his marriage around this time. Without a son, all hopes for the Bourbon-Beaujeu line rested on Suzanne. There was disagreement between Pierre II, duc de Bourbon and his wife Anne de Valois, duchesse de Bourbon (the daughter of the French king Louis XI) as to the right marriage strategy to follow for their daughter. The duc, Pierre, favoured a match for Suzanne with the duc d'Alençon, Charles de Valois. The duchesse, Anne, favoured a match for Suzanne with the comte de Montpensier, Louis II (elder brother of Charles de Bourbon). The preference of the duc de Bourbon for the Alençon match could be seen as retaliation for the prior actions of the Bourbon-Montpensier family to attempt to sabotage the transmission of the Bourbon inheritance rights through Suzanne. David-Chapy ultimately dismisses the argument that the ducs aversion to a Bourbon-Montpensier match was driven by spite, proposing instead that it was royal pressure towards Alençon, who was favoured by the King in the hopes of avoiding a consolidation of Bourbon lands at the heart of the kingdom, a 'mutual reinforcement'. By contrast the lands of the duc de Bourbon and those of Alençon were separated widely from one another across the kingdom. It was this very prospect of consolidation and the strengthening of the Bourbon principality at the heart of the kingdom that excited the duchesse de Bourbon towards the Montpensier match. After the death of Louis II de Bourbon in August 1501, the target of her marriage plans transferred to his younger brother, Charles de Bourbon, the new comte de Montpensier.

On 21 March 1501 the engagement of the duc d'Alençon and Suzanne de Bourbon was celebrated in the presence of the King at Moulins, capital of the duché de Bourbon. Upon the death of Charles de Bourbon's mother in 1503, the duchesse de Bourbon received the young comte de Montpensier at her court in Moulins. Clara Gonzaga's death was followed soon thereafter by that of the duchesse de Bourbon's husband Pierre in October 1503. With her husband dead, the duchesse de Bourbon moved to annul the engagement of her daughter to Alençon to pursue the match with Charles de Bourbon.

According to the historian Crouzet, with the Bourbon's subjects won over by the young comte de Montpensier they pushed the duchesse de Bourbon towards a match with the comte de Montpensier that she did not want for her daughter. The historian David-Chapy sees this situation differently. They argue instead that pressure from her subjects was simply a convenient pretext for the duchesse de Bourbon to annul the Alençon engagement which she wished to terminate herself. By this means the engagement could be ended with tact in such a way as to not cause discord between the house of Bourbon and that of Alençon. David-Chapy places the Montpensier match in the context of matches arranged by the duchesse de Bourbon since the 1480s and finds it in keeping with prior policy and strategy.

=== Marriage ===
A marriage contract between Charles de Bourbon and Suzanne de Bourbon was established on 26 February 1505. By its terms the dowager duchesse surrendered all her property to the couple, and they were likewise to bequeath all their properties to one another. This thus realised Anne's ambition to keep the Bourbon territories united. David-Chapy thinks it possible that the dowager duchesse de Bourbon may have commissioned a stained glass window of Saint Anne educating her daughter the Virgin Mary for the occasion from the artist Jean Hey.

Louis XII demonstrated his goodwill towards the family by permitting the match to go ahead. On 10 May 1505, the fifteen-year-old Charles de Bourbon married the fourteen-year-old Suzanne de Bourbon. As concerns the personality of Charles' young bride, the historians Hamon describes Suzanne as 'self effacing'. As for Charles de Bourbon, the historian Knecht describes him as 'handsome'.

=== Children ===
The couple would have three children:

- François de Bourbon, comte de Clermont (July 1517 – ?), died young.
- Unnamed twins, died young.

The baptism of their son transpired on 29 October 1517. The French court, and king Francis were at Moulins for the occasion, Francis being the young boy's godfather. According to the contemporary historian (and secretary of the duc de Bourbon) de Marillac, jousts and other festivities commemorated the occasion. In the actual ceremony, Bourbon's maternal uncle, the vicomte de Thouars carried the gold baptismal font. After the baptism, the court departed down the river Allier to the Loire.

King Francis would again serve as godfather to a child of Charles de Bourbon in 1519. The child over which Francis was godfather, died after only a few months.

After the early death of their children, Suzanne drew up her will which was in universal favour of her husband on 15 December 1519.

=== Domains ===
Kingdom of France in 1477, all the teal lands indicated as 'Bourbon' would come into the hands of Charles de Bourbon after 1505 with the exception of the county of Vendôme and the addition of the county of La Marche

Bourbon would in his life hold the comté (county) de Montpensier, the duchés (duchies) de Bourbon, Auvergne and Châtellerault; the comtés (counties) de Forez, La Marche, Beaujolais, and Clermont-en-Beauvaisis; the dauphiné d'Auvergne, the principality of Dombes; and the seigneuries de Combrailles, La Roche-en-Régnier, Bourbon-Lancy, Mercœur and Annonay. Bourbon enjoyed a great deal of independence in his various territories. He was able to raise soldiers, employed his own fiscal and judicial officers, and held many fortresses. David-Chapy describes his agglomeration of territories as making him the last feudatory able to oppose royal power.

By the unification of the Bourbon-Beaujeu and Bourbon-Montpensier branches of the royal house an immense territory in the heart of the French kingdom was consolidated. Control of this bloc afforded its holder a troubling power, that would be to the alarm of king Francis. By his agglomeration of territories, Bourbon was a peer of France five times over.

Though her daughter was now married to Charles de Bourbon, the dowager duchesse de Bourbon Anne continued to exercise administration in the Bourbon-Beaujeu territories brought to the marriage. For example, in 1518, it was the dowager duchesse de Bourbon who mandated the use of French for all procedural documents as related to the seigneurie (lordship) de Beaujolais. She also made various appointments to offices in the duché de Bourbon between 1505 and her death in 1522.

Due to their control by a great feudatory, neither the duché de Bourbon or duché d'Auvergne would have a royal military governor who represented the King in them. Later in the century they would receive one.

One of the territories in Bourbon's possession was the principality of Dombes which was located on the left bank of the river Saône to the south of the Franche-Comté. This territory was part of the Holy Roman Empire. It was a sovereign domain, with the rights to mint its own money, levy taxes and enjoy separate justice (a parlement for the little territory was established in Lyon in 1523). The territory would be confiscated by Francis I, but returned to the Bourbon-Montpensier family in 1560.

Dissatisfied with a 1484 marriage contract they had secured with the Bourbon-Montpensier, the house of La Trémoille brought a lawsuit against Charles' father Gilbert. In 1489, Gilbert agreed to compensate the La Trémoille family with the receipt of three seigneuries in lower-Auvergne (Fromental, Saurier and Champeix). The Bourbon-Montpensier would have the right to redeem these territories from the La Trémoille for a period of 20 years for the sum of 30,000 livres tournois (the Tours pound, monetary unit of account in early modern France). Charles de Bourbon would redeem the territories in September 1508 for 30,000 livres.

As a result of the arbitrage reached on 8 June 1514 between Charles de Bourbon and the seigneur de Boisy, Charles ceded to Boisy control of the parts of the seigneurie de Roanne that the latter had lacked control of. Charles' wife Suzanne thus granted this territory to the seigneur de Boisy on 16 September 1515. This terminated a legal dispute which had arisen almost fifty years prior between Charles' maternal uncle and the seigneur de Boisy's father. With the confiscation of Bourbon's lands after his betrayal, the parts of Roanne donated to Boisy would be taken over by the crown.

Charles de Bourbon also enjoyed possession of a library. After he betrayed the French kingdom, the library was seized, and merged with the royal library at Blois.

=== Governance ===
The administration of Bourbon's territories is described by the historian Jouanna as having been 'quasi-royal'. His territories were governed by many councils, a chief cour des comptes (court of accounts) with secondary courts in Montbrison for the Forez, Villefranche for the Beaujolais, Riom for the Auvergne and Moulins for the duché de Bourbon. There was also a high court of justice whose appeals went straight to the parlement, and many other officers.

=== Residences ===
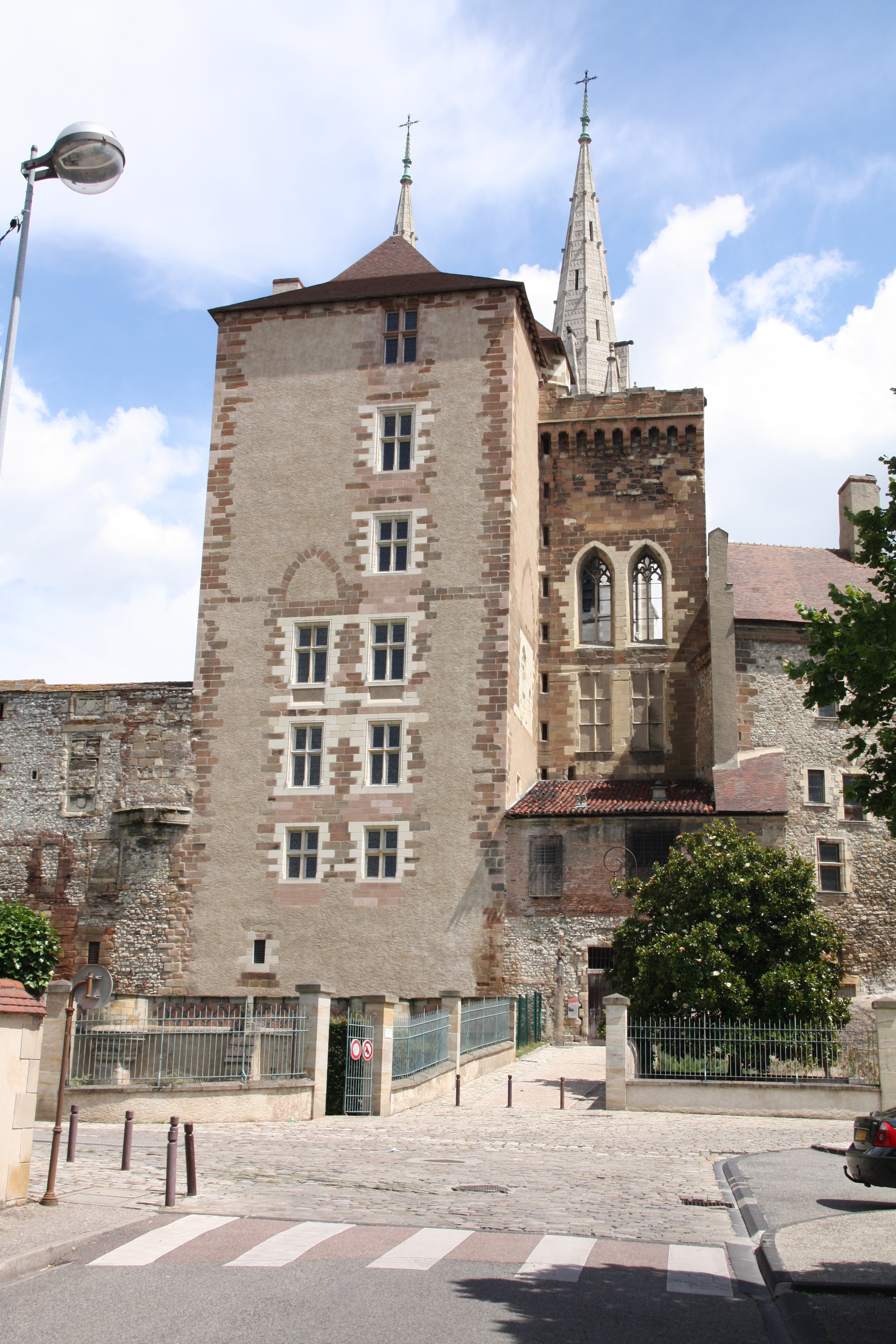
What remains of the château de Moulins

Of the many fortresses in his domains, that of Chantelle was the most formidable. His château de Moulins was home to a brilliant court life. The households of the greats in this era could be extensive, with many dependants including chambellans, écuyers and maîtres d'hôtel (chamberlains, squires, masters of the house) among others. Charles de Bourbon enjoyed a household of several hundred people. In addition to his châteaux, Bourbon held a grand urban mansion called the hôtel du Petit-Bourbon. In later times this hôtel would come into the possession of Galiot de Genouillac.

=== Clients, servants and allies ===
In his service were to be found captains of the gendarmerie (i.e. the aristocratic heavy-cavalry of the French army), such as the seigneur de Saint-Vallier and the seigneur de Montpoupon.

Among those in Charles de Bourbon's service was a certain bourgeois named Pierre Filhol, who would go on to become the archbishop of Aix-en-Provence. Hamon highlights that some sources suggest that Gilbert Bayard, who would go on to the be the French kings chief secretary served as a secretary and contrôleur-général (controller general) of Bourbon's household. The historian cautions that we lack certainty in this, and that Bayard would not play any role in Charles de Bourbon's betrayal of Francis. The father of the future chancellor of France Michel de L'Hôpital, Jean de L'Hôpital served as Charles' doctor and advisor. His relationship with Bourbon would force both he and his son to flee from France after Bourbon's betrayal, the future chancellor therefore spending his early years as an exile in Italy.

Charles de Bourbon was close with his Bourbon-Vendôme cousins: the duc de Vendôme, Charles and the comte de Saint-Pol, François.

=== Incomes ===
In terms of incomes, at one point in Charles de Bourbon's life, he would enjoy an income of between 250,000 and 300,000 livres, of which around 75,000 comprised pensions and wages. Bourbon would devote significant financial resources towards the French campaigns in Italy that the kings undertook in this period. The historian Hamon puts the amount he devoted towards this cause at 280,000 livres. In the same way, in the fighting on the northern French frontier in 1521, Charles de Bourbon would offer up his silver collection. This theoretically vast income he enjoyed can be deceptive, as relations between Charles and Francis deteriorated after 1515 the King ceased to pay Charles his pensions or wages. In part due to his financing of the foreign expeditions, and in part due to the cutting off of royal funds, Charles would experience cash flow troubles. The royal fiscal officer Jehan Sapin (who was the receveur général for the province of Languedoc) would serve as Charles de Bourbon's trésorier and receveur général (treasurer and receiver general). Bourbon would become indebted to his trésorier to the sum of 50,645 livres.

=== Early years ===
Charles was orphaned early in his life, both his parents being dead by 1503 when he was around thirteen. He would therefore be raised and educated at the Bourbon court of Moulins alongside his future wife Suzanne de Bourbon. Charles' education was both humanist and courtly: being taught both Latin and the running of the lance.

== Reign of Louis XII ==
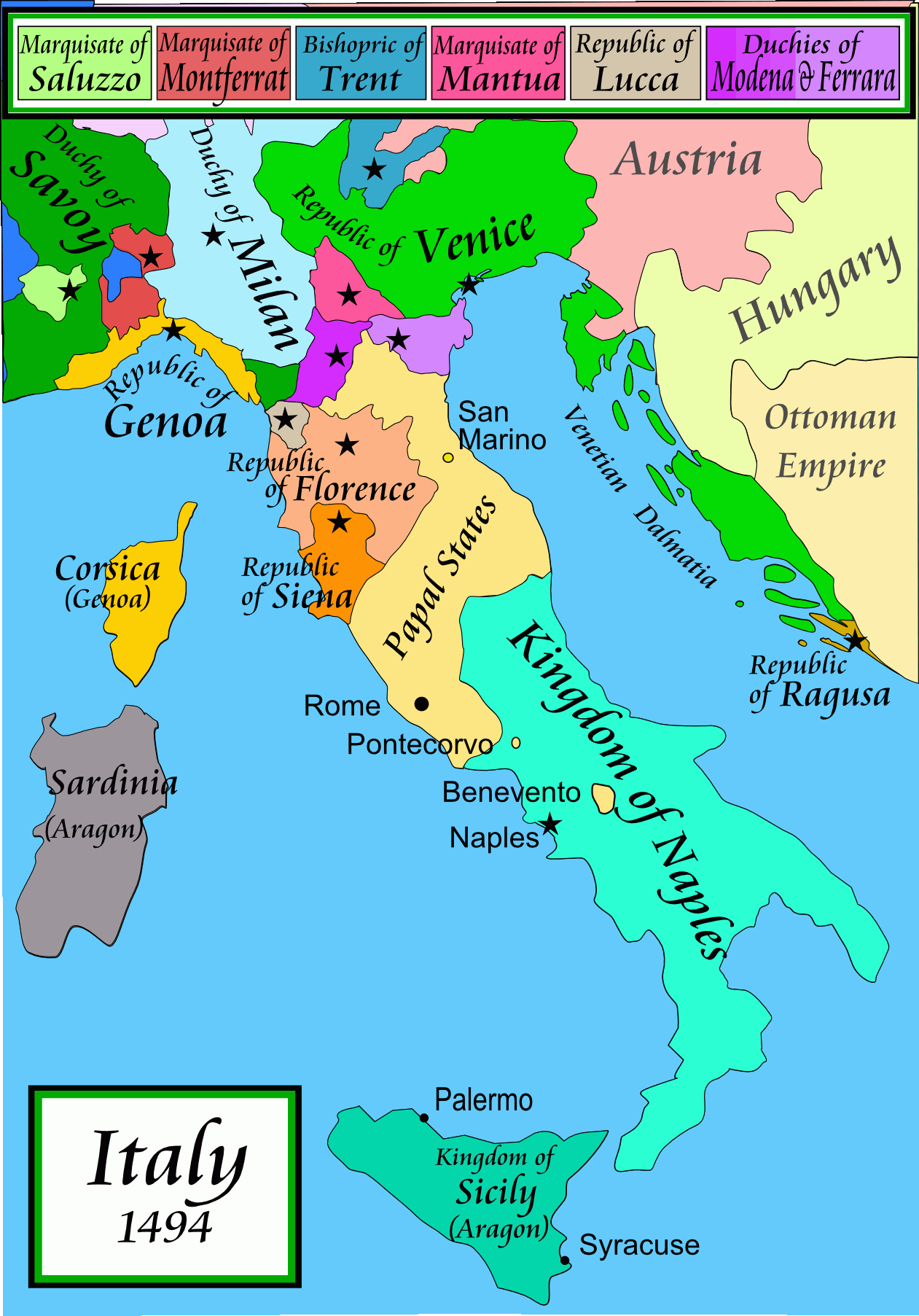
Polities of Italy in 1494, at the outbreak of the Italian Wars

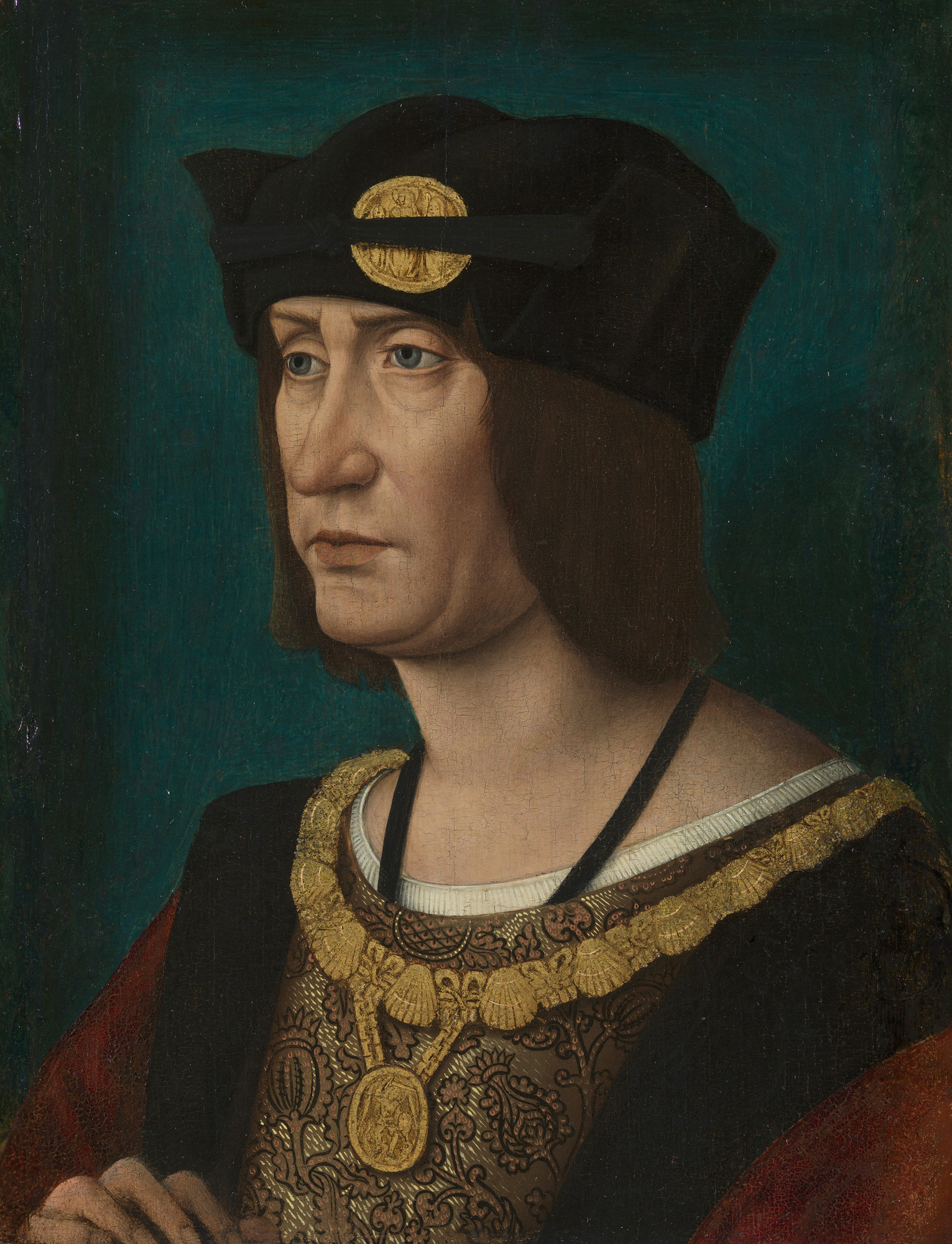
King of France from 1498 to 1515, Louis XII

After his marriage on 10 May 1505, Charles de Bourbon, the comte de Montpensier assumed the title of the duc de Bourbon, by which title he would be known in the rest of his life, and by which he will be referred throughout the remainder of this article.

For the occasion of the marriage of the comte d'Angoulême to Claude de Valois (the daughter and heir of king Louis XII) in May 1506, the duc de Bourbon made an appearance with a hundred nobles, all dressed in sumptuous style.

=== Genoa campaign ===
At this time Bourbon had no significant royal office to speak of, and therefore set about looking to acquire royal blessings on the battlefields of Italy. To this end he raised soldiers on his own expense.

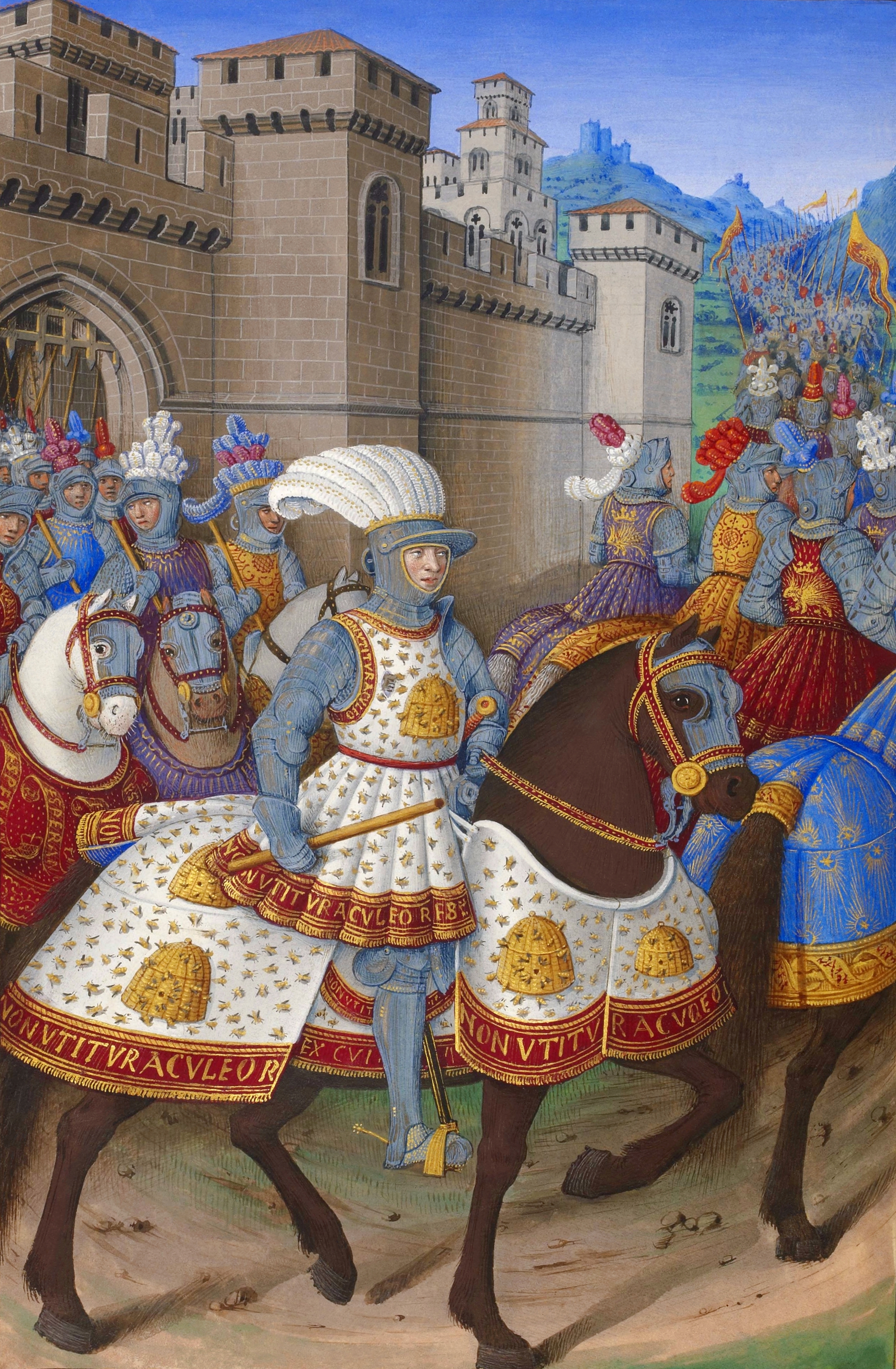
Louis XII on his way to deal with Genoa

French control of Genoa was important as a facilitator of French control of the duchy of Milan, this at least was the view of many contemporaries, including Bourbon's secretary de Marillac. A rebellion erupted in the French Italian republic of Genoa in June 1506. This rebellion initially held a class character and was not anti-French. The rebels against the city elites declared their loyalty to Louis, but the French king was troubled by their innovations. Louis first imagined punishing the city by levying a fine against it, before resolving on a military campaign in November 1506. With the French having evacuated Genoa, the city declared itself to be in rebellion against France in March 1507. By this time, Louis and a French army were already to be found in the north Italian region of Piedmont. Bourbon participated in the French reconquest of the city which transpired in late April.

=== Agnadello ===
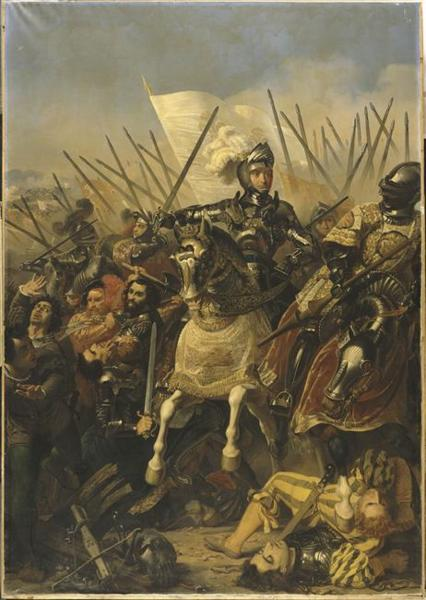
Battle of Agnadello, the French victory over the Venetians in 1509

The excuse for war between France and the republic of Venice was provided in the spring of 1509 when pope Julius II demanded that Venice pull out of the Romagna region they were occupying. The threat of excommunication hanged over their non-compliance with this demand. A time limit for this excommunication was given to Venice, but before it expired, on 17 April, a herald from Louis XII arrived to declare war on the republic. Soon after the declaration of war, Louis crossed the Alps to take command of the French army for the campaign. The French army contained an unusual amount of native French infantry. Bourbon commanded those soldiers he had raised personally alongside the two companies the King had granted him. Baumgartner records it differently, suggesting that Bourbon was the lieutenant to the famous knight Bayard in a company of 500 infantry. The French army, numbered in total some 27,000 men of which 7,000 were cavalry, with 30 artillery pieces. The traditional construction of an army of this period was to divide it into three pieces proceeding one after the other, the first corps, called the vanguard; the second corps called the battle and the third corps called the rearguard. It was tradition for the vanguard to be commanded by the constable of France. The French vanguard was under the command of the maréchal de Chaumont (marshal Chaumont) and boasted 8,000 Swiss, 2,000 Gascons, 615 lances and 20 pieces of the artillery defended by 500 Gascons. The battle of the army was under the command of the duc de Bourbon, and contained also the king. Here were to be found 532 archers, 800 lances, 6,500 infantry and the remainder of the artillery with pioneers. Several hundred lances of the battle were with the vanguard to reinforce them. The rearguard contained 3,500 infantry and a further 580 lances. They made contact with the smaller Venetian army which was in retreat at the battle of Agnadello. The French column either caught the Venetian rearguard by surprise, or was set upon by the Venetian rearguard and battle was thereby joined at Agnadello near Cremona on 14 May 1509. The Venetians took the defence behind a ditch and succeeded in breaking the first attack led by the maréchal de Chaumont. It was now the turn of the King to lead an attack, and his gendarmes broke the Venetian cavalry, then fell upon the infantry. The battle lasted around three to four hours. Bourbon credited himself by his conduct during the battle. The historian Quilliet honours him with being the origin of 'initiatives and wise advice' which brought the French the victory on the field. Venetian casualties were estimated at 6,000 to 8,000 by the contemporary historian Guicciardini while the French lost 400. The battle devastated the Venetians. Despite this triumph, little royal reward immediately appeared for Bourbon, and it would take time for the benefits of royal favour to flow his way.

Bourbon was the subject of an appeal from the marquise of Mantua, Isabella in favour of her husband the marquis Francesco. The marquis was in Italian captivity, and his wife implored several French figures (alongside Bourbon, the queen of France, Anne, the heir presumptive to the throne the comte d'Angoulême, and the dowager duchesse de Bourbon) to see to his liberation.

On 7 May 1510, Louis made his Joyous Entry (a sovereign's first entry into a town or city, a moment of celebration) into the city of Dijon, the capital of the vicomte de Thouars' governate of Burgundy. For the occasion Dijon offered wine to the whole court. The King was afford a hundred barrels of wine, their governor twenty, the heir to the French throne the comte d'Angoulême ten, and the duc de Bourbon six.

With the death of the duc de Nemours in 1512, the historian Jacquart argues that Bourbon was left as the greatest living military commander of France.

For a brief period from April to June 1512, the duc de Bourbon would serve as the King's lieutenant for the duchy of Milan.

Bourbon would be appointed as lieutenant-général of the army of Languedoc.

=== Navarrese campaign ===
In dark red, the Navarrese lands that would be conquered by the Spanish, in the lighter shade, those which would remain in the French orbit

The Spanish invaded the kingdom of Navarre in July 1512, with an army led by the duke of Alba. France was allied with the little kingdom, and in addition to this the Spanish invasion threatened the south of the kingdom of France. A French army, comprising many captains who had survived the last Italian campaign got underway in October. At the head of this army were the governor of Guyenne the duc de Longueville, the grand maître de La Palice, the duc de Bourbon and the vicomte de Lautrec (viscount of Lautrec). There was much rivalry among the command which complicated the campaign. The French army enjoyed success at Bayonne but faced embarrassment at the siege of Saint-Jean-Pied-de-Port where they were unable to prevent the duke of Alba from withdrawing over the Pyrenees to the safety of Pamplona. The French captains followed the duke of Alba to Pamplona, but ultimately the parts of Navarre on the Spanish side of the Pyrenees would remain under the control of the king of Aragon, Ferdinand II.

Bourbon fought alongside the comte d'Angoulême against the English in the north-eastern province of Picardy around this time.

=== Governor of Languedoc ===
In September 1512, the duc de Bourbon was made governor of Languedoc, one of the largest provinces of France, due to the pressing demands of the military circumstances. This appointment came with a pension of 24,000 livres. This pension was only slightly less than that afforded by the French crown to the sovereign duke of Savoy who enjoyed one of 25,000 livres. The office of governor of Languedoc had been in the hands of the Bourbon family with only a brief interlude since 1466 (the charge had lain vacant from 1503 to 1512 at the request of the Estates of Languedoc). Bourbon would not immediately inform the estates of the province of his new charge however, knowing them to be hostile to the existence of the office. Therefore, during the crisis that gripped the kingdom in these months, with the threat of invasion looming, the cardinal de Briçonnet took the lead in Languedoc.

In addition to the dispute with the Estates, there was also a long running disagreement over jurisdiction between the governors of Languedoc and the parlement of Toulouse (highest level sovereign courts of the kingdom) which stretched back through the fifteenth-century. Bourbon's father-in-law, the late Pierre II, duc de Bourbon's appointment to the charge in 1488 had led to acrimony between his procureur (attorney) Jean de La Roche-Aymon and the procuruer-général of the parlement. It would only be with a new royal mandate in 1490 that the extent of his authority as governor had been unconditionally registered. For his part, Bourbon's provisions of office were not ratified by the parlement of Toulouse, as such their contents are unknown.

In April 1513, a truce was secured with the Spanish for a year after their successful conquest of much of Navarre. Nevertheless, it was a delicate peace, and Briçonnet worked to heighten the defences of Narbonne in Languedoc, which was close to the Spanish border. Briçonnet saw to the supply of powder, complained about the paltry reinforcements he was receiving, and also bemoaned the delays in the arrival of the duc de Bourbon's companies to support in Languedoc's defence.

=== Disaster at Novara ===
Several events allowed for Louis to consider a new Italian campaign in 1513. This included the truce with the Aragonese king Ferdinand allowing for a reduction in the border defences; the death of pope Julius II in February which allowed for peace with the Papacy; and the new alliance with Venice secured in March. For the occasion of this campaign, the royal army would be composed of 1,375 lances, 613 light horse, 7,486 landsknechts (German mercenaries, the rivals of the Swiss mercenaries) and 6,500 foot soldiers. This large army would be under the command of the maréchal de Trivulzio and Bourbon's uncle the vicomte de Thouars.

Bourbon himself had originally meant to enjoy the command allocated to Thouars, and, aggrieved at the prospective 'insult' of having to serve under his uncle, he resolved not to take up his place in the army. Instead, Bourbon left court, excusing himself on the grounds of making a pilgrimage to Notre Dame du Puy. This episode represented the nucleus of a rivalry between Bourbon and Thouars.

The French army in Italy would suffer defeat the battle of Novara in June 1513 at the hands of the Swiss. Louis learned of the terrible defeat on 9 June. The vicomte de Thouars, who had retreated back into France, did not make it to court, arriving only at Lyon before he was ordered to head to his government of Burgundy to stave off a new attack by the Swiss. Indeed, Bourbon would join in the effort to protect Burgundy against the depredations of the Swiss. This represented something of a disgrace for Thouars. According to Bourbon's contemporary biographer and secretary de Marillac, Louis now much regretted choosing Thouars as a head of the expedition over the duc de Bourbon.

In August 1513, Bourbon finally notified the Estates of Languedoc of his appointment as governor of the province. Despite this step, it would still be Briçonnet who was the King's chief commissioner at the estates held at Nîmes on 16 November 1513.

In June 1514, the vicomte de Thoaurs tried to engineer the re-election of the mayor of Dijon, Bénigne de Cirey, who had commended himself during the recent siege of the city. Cirey did not wish to stand for mayor however, and looked to see a certain Pierre Sayve elected. To this end he appealed to various royal officials such as the duc de Bourbon.

On 3 October 1514, the new queen of France Mary Tudor landed in France at Boulogne. For her entrance into the kingdom she was greeted by many great French seigneurs, among whom the duc de Bourbon, the duc d'Alençon, the comte d'Angoulême, the vicomte de Thouars and the sire d'Orval. Only 6 days later, on 9 October, Louis XII would be married to his young bride.

=== Louis XII's final campaign ===
The King remained interested in the reconquest of 'his duchy' of Milan. To this end in 1514 he began the assembling of a new army, with landsknecht mercenaries recruited to this end. Louis envisioned a force of almost 42,000 men for the invasion. The Venetians were eager to see this expedition come to pass, as they hoped they might recover territories lost to them in 1509. Louis could also look to his new brother-in-law Henry VIII for the provision of archers for the expedition. The King was of two minds as to who should lead this new expedition, the vicomte de Thouars, or the duc de Bourbon. By August 1514, the troops were ready, and according to the memoirist du Bellay, it was to be Bourbon who commanded the expedition. Bourbon was given the task of reviewing the soldiers of the expeditionary force. This was to the grief of the King's son-in-law the comte d'Angoulême who felt he should have charge of such operations. By contrast, in a letter to the Venetian ambassador on 11 August, Louis asserted that it would be the vicomte de Thouars who served as "capitanio di l'impresa" (captain of the company). Bourbon was at this time serving as the King's lieutenant in Burgundy, a responsibility he chafed under.

In the words of Robert Maquereau, which Hamon suggests might be somewhat exaggerated, by the end of the reign of Louis XII, nothing was done in the kingdom without the advice of the duc de Bourbon. Louis is supposed to have promised the duc de Bourbon receipt of the office of Constable of France, this promise would not be realised until the reign of his successor.

Despite his campaigning ambitions, Louis XII was by now fifty-two years old, sickly, and he also suffered from gout. As his life faded in December 1514, the Venetian ambassador noted that the duc de Bourbon and other men had been called to the capital to help in the planning of military endeavours for the coming campaign. Between 22:00 and 23:00 on 1 January 1515, while residing in the Hôtel des Tournelles, Louis XII died. His deathbed was surrounded by princes du sang and his familiars. Present were the duc de Bourbon, the comte de Vendôme, the comte de Saint-Pol, the vicomte de Thouars and the bishop of Paris among others. The comte d'Angoulême, heir to the throne, was to be found nearby. Angoulême would soon proclaim the death of Louis XII and his ascent to the throne as Francis I (or François I).

== Apogee of favour ==
There were only two lineages in the kingdom at the beginning of Francis' reign which could offer a threat to the King's predominance in his kingdom: that of the house of Albret and that of Bourbon. The former was neutralised through a 1527 marriage which tied the house to the royal one by pairing Francis' widowed sister Marguerite with Henri II d'Albret, king of Navarre (the second most powerful seigneur in the kingdom behind Bourbon). Bourbon would represent a greater challenge to deal with.

The King's mother, Louise, occupied a place of the greatest significance in the kingdom before her death in 1531, above all the King's favourites. She injected men to the royal council (such as her brother the comte de Tende) and further down the line would also be the architect of men's removal such as in the case of the baron de Semblançay and the duc de Bourbon.

=== Constable of France ===
With the advent of a new monarch came a significant injection of new blood into the royal entourage. Francis introduced to high office and favour, young men of his generation such as the Gouffier brothers - the seigneur de Boisy made Grand Maître (Grand Master of France) on 7 January, and the seigneur de Bonnivet established as first the premier gentilhomme de la chambre (first gentleman of the King's chamber) in 1516 and then Admiral de France a year later. Antoine Duprat was established as the new Chancellor on 7 January, as the office was presently vacant. The duc de Bourbon was also a beneficiary of this process, being made the Constable of France (connétable de France) on 12 January, as a reward for his exemplary military service for the crown. David-Chapy speculates that the King's mother Louise may have a part to play in Francis' choice to elevate the duc de Bourbon to this most prestigious of all the French royal offices. Between 1488 and 1515 the office had lain vacant. After Bourbon's death it would again lay vacant until 1538.

At the time of his elevation Bourbon was still a young man. The historian Jacquart writes that compared to the vicomte de Thouars (born in 1460) and the maréchal de Trivulzio (who was 65) he might as well have been a child.

The office afforded its holder significant powers. Le Roux argues that the granting of this office to Bourbon was an acknowledgement of his importance. Francis could through the conferment of this title, be assured of Bourbon's loyalty. Complementary to its vast powers came a sizable income of 24,000 livres with the office, an income equalled only by that of the chancellor.

It would be codified by king Henri III in 1582 that the Constable was the most senior of the grand officiers de la couronne (great officers of the crown), above even the chancellor. The office of constable was held for life, and was meant to be the King's closest council who was always consulted before the declaration of any act of war. The Constable was the head of the French armies, and excluding the King was above all nobles on the battlefield whatever their titles. He worked alongside the maréchaux (marshals), likewise appointed for life, who were his "collaborators and coadjudicators". By tradition there were a maximum of four marshals at any one time below the Constable, however this rule was broken in 1516 with the appointment of the maréchal de Coligny. The maréchaux were also grand officiers de la couronne and jointly judged matters of honour alongside the Constable. The commissares des guerres (war commissars - responsible for logistics, military administration and accounting) and the prévôts des maréchaux (marshals provost - magistrates responsible for monitoring the offenses of soldiers and maintaining order on the roads) were under the joint authority of the Constable de Bourbon and the maréchaux. In addition to these material responsibilities, the Constable enjoyed the symbolic privilege of wielding the royal sword during ceremonies.

On 12 January, Francis confirmed Bourbon as governor of Languedoc, by the same terms as those granted to his uncle-in-law in 1483 and father-in-law in 1488. The duc de Bourbon's lieutenant, Just de Tournon would present these provisions to the parlement on his behalf. He took a different tack to that which had been taken in 1488 with the court, seeking to sooth passions, assuring them that Bourbon did not wish for conflict with the body. While Bourbon would enjoy the rights of pardon and remission he would have no cognisance over private litigation, which remained devolved to the parlement.

In addition to his role as constable, Bourbon also held a place in the King's household as Grand Chambrier de France, which was a position responsible for the management of the King's chamber, not to be confused with the office of grand chambellan.

While Bourbon had received the office of constable, the affirmation of his control over Languedoc and the position of grand chambrier in the royal household from the new administration, Reid argues his favour was comparatively slim. Reid compares Bourbon with the titles, lands and pensions granted to the women in Francis' family (i.e. Louise and his sister Marguerite).

=== Royal council ===
At the start of the reign of Francis, there were two royal councils. The conseil étroit (narrow council) which met in the morning and dealt with politics and edicts; and the conseil privé (privy council) which met in the afternoon and dealt with requests. The King's councils were dominated by nobles of the sword (nobles d'épée) i.e. the military nobility. Great feudal nobles, and princes, like the king of Navarre, the duc d'Alençon and the duc de Bourbon, constituted only a minority of these sword nobles on the royal councils. The constable de Bourbon would be among those great nobles (like the duc de Lorraine and duc de Vendôme) who would on occasion be called to council as someone who was 'present' for the meeting. Without necessarily having any involvement in the construction of policy, their presence for its establishment acted as a legitimising tool. In Michon's opinion, among all the 'princes and ducs' invited to royal council, the only one who enjoyed political heft was Bourbon's cousin, the comte de Saint-Pol.

Bourbon's attendance of royal council would quickly evaporate after the first year of Francis' reign, in which his presence is recorded nine times, already a somewhat diminutive presence in comparison with men such as the seigneur de Boisy who attended twenty one times. In 1516, record survives of four attendances. From here on, he is absent. When looking at the 58 acts of the royal council between 1515 and 1519 for which lists of those present for the act is recorded, the historian Potter finds the duc de Bourbon as having been with the court for between 6 and 8 of these acts. In the analysis of the historian Crouzet the Constable was thereon distant from the court. Though this must factor in the consideration that Bourbon had his own court at Moulins. In their study of the records of council presences, Rentet and Michon accord Bourbon a role of secondary importance in the royal council in 1515 and 1516. Le Fur argues that Bourbon's absence from royal council 1517 onwards could be justified by the peace France enjoyed with its neighbours.

=== Coronation of Francis ===
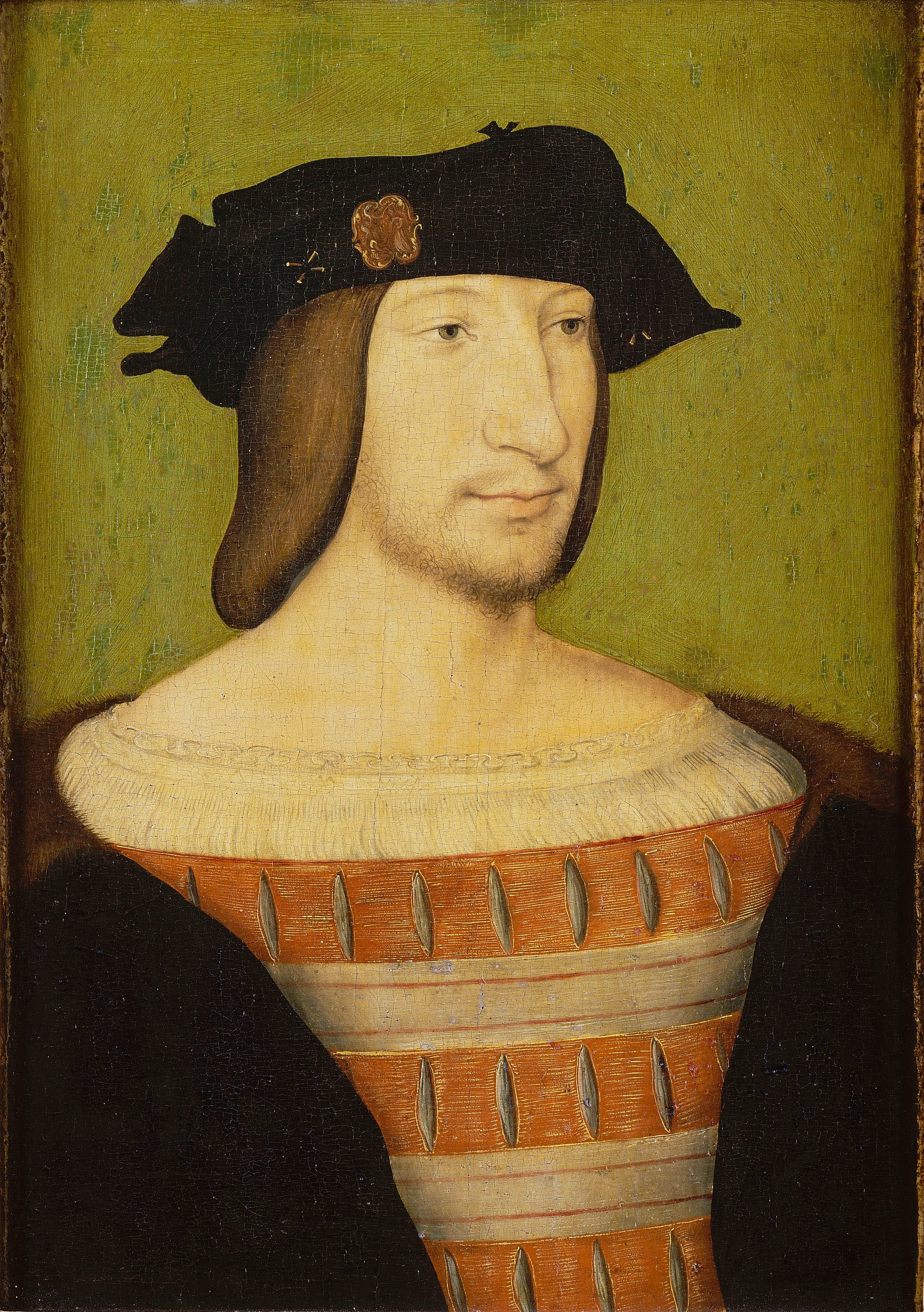
Francis I in 1515, around the time of his coronation

Six days after the burial of Louis XII, the new king Francis made for Reims to undertake his coronation. A star studded group of nobles accompanied him for this most significant ceremony. Chief among them were the duc d'Alençon (now the premier prince du sang and heir presumptive to the throne), the duc de Bourbon, the comte de Vendôme, the comte de Saint-Pol, the comte de Guise, the comte de Nevers and the knights of the Ordre de Saint-Michel (Order of Saint-Michel - highest order of French chivalry). Also present was the new king's mother Louise. This grand entourage arrived in Reims on 24 January to an elaborate reception.

As constable, the duc de Bourbon had a symbolic role to play in the ceremony which transpired on 25 January. Part of the ceremony involved the King's receipt of the paraphernalia of knighthood. The duc d'Alençon affixed and then removed spurs from the King's ankles. Then the archbishop of Reims drew his sword from the scabbard and girded the King with it before removing it. The archbishop then kissed the sword and put it in Francis' hands. Francis briefly held it, before passing it over to the constable de Bourbon who knighted the king. For the remainder of the ceremony and during the feast later, the Constable held the sword aloft. This was with the exception of the part of the ceremony in which Francis received communion under both kinds, during which as a sign of humility the Constable lowered his sword. Once the ceremonies had concluded, Francis departed the cathedral preceded by the princes du sang to receive the acclamation of crowds that had gathered outside. On 27 January, Francis and the royal party took the road back to Paris.

Having entered the French capital for the first time as king, Francis played witness to spectacles put on for him. In one of them the King was depicted in royal state, with his instruments of authority. He was surrounded by two figures, one dressed up as 'lady France' the other 'lady Faith'. Around this group of three were six wearing armour and carrying lances. These armoured figures wore heraldry that allowed them to be identified several of them to be identified as the duc d'Alençon, the duc de Bourbon and the comte de Vendôme. Finally, at the bottom of the scaffold were three more figures, one representing the common people, another vigilance, and a final fidelity. The royal procession made its way to the cathedral of Notre-Dame. In the procession were the great officers of the crown, the princes du sang and various other nobles. The duc de Bourbon wore a device on which the motto 'A toujours mais' was written "in large Greek letters". Arriving at the Notre-Dame they attended a service of thanksgiving. After the service came a banquet, and finally dances for the evening.

=== Reforming the army ===
The new constable, the duc de Bourbon would issue an ordinance on 20 January which was composed of thirty eight articles. By this ordinance, the gendarmerie and compagnies d'ordonnance were reorganised. Bourbon sought to expand upon the provisions made under Francis' predecessors: Charles VIII and Louis XII. An example of the conduct covered by the ordinance was that soldiers on the march were only to stay at a place one day and one night. They were not to get their hosts to find them foodstuffs from other cities, but to be content with what was in the place they were staying in. This would represent one of the first ordinances the King would sign in his reign. These years were otherwise quiet for ordinances, the King not having much in the way of a domestic program during 1515 and 1516.

=== Finishing Louis XII's campaign ===
For this campaign, Bourbon would enjoy a deal of autonomy in its design, with little involvement from the royal council. Francis meanwhile feigned that he had other priorities to the reconquest of Milan.

No sooner had the death of Louis been announced, than the Venetians were assured Francis intended to lead a new expedition into Italy. Francis was eager to conquer his wife Claude's dowry, the duchy of Milan. By agreement with the Venetians, he assured them Verona would be restored to them from Imperial occupation (i.e. that of the Holy Roman Emperor). Imperial neutrality in turn was bought by the treaty of Paris on 24 March 1515 which arranged for a marriage between Renée de Valois and the lord of the Netherlands (future Holy Roman Emperor Charles V). Francis would give the couple the chief towns of Picardy by way of dowry. On 8 May, a French alliance with England was confirmed. With all these pieces in place, the King's mind could turn to preparing an invasion.

The duke of Milan raised 35,000 Swiss infantry to oppose the French invasion of Italy. The opponents of France had not been idle as the French preparations for an invasion proceeded. Back in February 1515, an alliance of Pope Leo X, the duke of Milan, the Holy Roman Emperor Maximilian I, the king of Aragon and the Swiss had been formed. The Swiss controlled Milan in the name of its duke. To guard against the possibility of an attack across the Pyrenees or into Burgundy while the Italian campaign was underway, the constable de Bourbon stationed 500 lances along the former border, and more in Burgundy. Once the French had entered Genoa and Piedmont, these French soldiers would be replaced by mercenaries secured through the agreement established with Genoa, thereby freeing them up.

Though France had Venice on side, much of the rest of the Italian peninsula was hostile to them. As concerned the republic of Genoa, it was threatened by the duke of Milan, who wished to re-establish control over the place. The doge of Genoa, Ottaviano Fregoso, did not have an entirely secure position in the republic, with some desiring his deposal. Fregoso thus saw in French outreach an attempt to secure his position. Negotiations with the Genoese were begun in secret by the constable de Bourbon in February 1515. When Francis became duke of Milan, Fregoso would be assured in his position but as a permanent French governor rather than as doge. This reduction in his powers would receive compensation through receipt of several thousand livres worth of annuities, a company of 100 lances and consideration for receipt of the collar of the Ordre de Saint-Michel. This offer was accepted by the Genoese in mid-March, with a treaty signed on 21 April. The city was to be handed over to the French in May, with the deal remaining secret until that time.

Despite the intent towards secrecy the Swiss became aware of this deal with the Genoese and in April began planning to invade the republic so that they might depose Fregoso. In June, the duke of Milan commanded the doge to step down, and began a naval blockade of Genoa. Fregoso assured them he had no alliance with France, and argued that if the Swiss violated his borders, he would not join any anti-French league. With this ultimatum having little effect, Fregoso asked for French support. Francis indicated his willingness to intervene, but war was averted by the efforts of Pope Leo X who declared his support for Fregoso.

In early 1515, units of light horse that Bourbon had raised were serving as garrisons at the perimeter of the Alps and the Rhône.

Francis established his mother Louise in the regency of the kingdom, in anticipation of his absence on campaign. Her powers over the royal domain were broad with scarcely any limits imposed upon them. This was approved by a royal council containing the seigneur de Boisy, the vicomte de Thouars, and the ducs de Lorraine, Alençon and Bourbon. Francis further declared the duke of Milan to be an usurper. The King had the rights to the duchy of Milan transferred from his wife (the daughter of Louis XII) to himself. In the absence of the constable de Bourbon from the kingdom, his charge as governor of Langedoc would be filled by the seigneur de Tournon. Bourbon supervised the assembling of the troops, which were to convene at Moirans in Dauphiné, meanwhile other troops gathered at Heyrieux taking advantage of preparations already made during the reign of Louis XII for this campaign. His participation in the campaign alongside the King was to be at his own expense. Bourbon arrived in Lyon on 23 or 30 June to an elaborate greeting from the people, with scaffolds erected upon which performances were given, with characters representing his courageous qualities. He was analogised to a John the Baptist preparing the way for the Christ king. His greeting was differentiated from that afforded to a monarch by the lack of canopy for his entrance.

Soon thereafter, on 12 July, Francis arrived in the city. He was also greeted with elaborate spectacles. In these spectacles, Bourbon was analogised to the Arthurian figure of Galahad. In another of the spectacles, Bourbon was represented by a winged stag, a symbol used by both the French kings (since Charles VI) and the house of Bourbon. It was identifiable as a representation of Bourbon by the motto 'Espérance' that it bore around its neck and on its shield. On top of the stag, a man in Bourbon's colours bore a flaming sword in the one hand, and an antler in the other. Though Bourbon had received a warm reception from Lyon, this would not mean the city escaped the responsibility of supporting the royal army, which it was to do with the provision of food and wine. The magistrates struggled to comprehend how they would meet the demands of the royal army: 4650 litres of wine, 4650 litres of flour and 1116 litres of oats were anticipated every day. Le Roux puts the size of the army at around either 30,000 or 40,000 infantry and 2,500 lances. He further argues that the army was likely the largest assembled so far in the Italian Wars. For the royal guard: it contained 400 archers, 200 mounted crossbowmen and 200 gentleman of the royal hôtel; for cavalry 2,500 lances (by the time of Francis' reign a lance was composed of a gendarme heavy cavalrymen wielding a lance and two archers who functioned as light-cavalry); for infantry 10,000 French and Navarrese and 22,000 Landsknechts. There were also sixty piece of artillery. The strength of the bridge across the river Rhône to support this artillery was also a concern to the urban magistracy of Lyon. This army was divided into three principal blocks. The constable de Bourbon held command of the vanguard of the army as was customary right of the Constable for an army in which the King was present. Under his authority were the maréchaux de La Palice and de Trivulzio, the admiral de Bonnivet, the vicomte de Thouars and the engineer Pedro Navarro.

The Swiss moved into Piedmont so that they might guard the typical passages through the Alps that the French used. Neither Bourbon, nor Francis wished to fight the Swiss in a closed valley, viewing the conditions there as too disadvantageous. Meanwhile, the condotierri (a form of Italian contract mercenary) Prospero Colonna assembled the Papal army in Bologna.

=== Marignano campaign ===
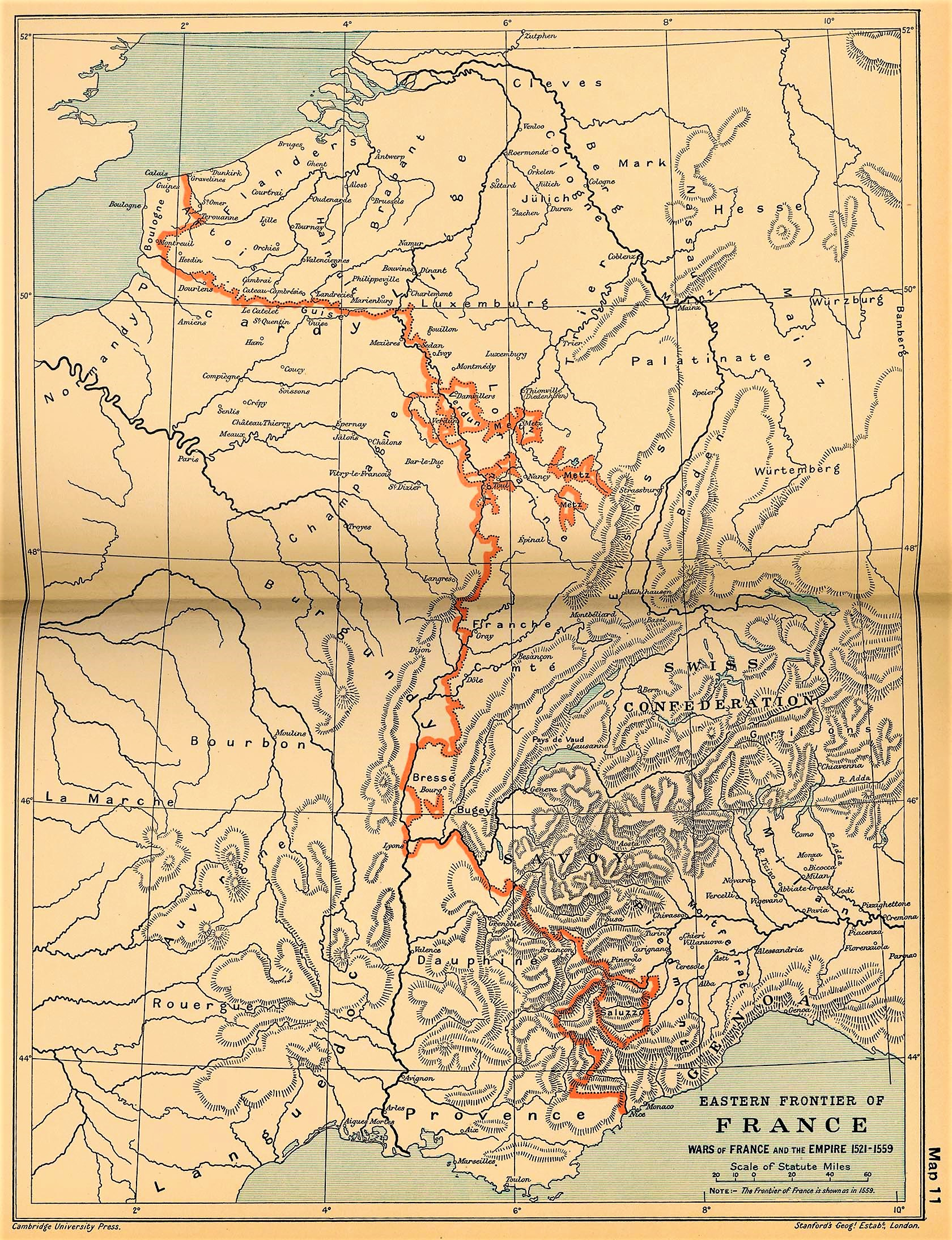
Map featuring many of the key locations in the Marignano campaign

The vanguard of the royal army began to make its way towards Grenoble on 17 July. Thus, Bourbon, and the maréchaux de Lautrec, de La Palice and de Trivulzio departed Lyon at this time with the soldiers. Arriving there, they discussed the campaign and utilised spies to appraise themselves of the preparations being made to greet them by the Swiss over the mountains. The royal body of the army then moved to join them in Grenoble, arriving in totality on 1 August.

A coup came for the French army, when in July they succeeded in advancing a small force of 5,000 landsknechts and 400 lances under the command of the maréchal de La Palice and the maréchal d'Aubigny through the never before militarily used Alpine pass known as the Col de Mary (which was a very high one) and surprising Colonna who was with the Papal cavalry at Villafranca on 15 August. Caught quite off guard the Hispano-Papal cavalry force was either killed or captured. The cavalry, numbering around 1,000 or 1,200 was thus seized as prisoners. By this blow, the coalition army was denied its cavalry, thereby compromising the position of the Swiss to guard the passes. The commander Colonna, who had surrendered without resistance, swore to no longer collaborate with France's enemies. The French pillaging of the Hispano-Papal baggage was interrupted by the Swiss, who pushed them into retreat.

In August, the main body of the French army got underway. As the army moved, a system of staged advance was used to ensure the army remained fed by proceeding through specific locations which were to prepare food for the army. Bourbon gave the order for the equipment of several places on the journey to the border.

On 4 August, Bourbon and the vanguard departed from Grenoble, the army made for Embrun, where on 7 August the constable de Bourbon conducted a review of the landsknechts. The following day they arrived at Mont-Dauphin. The vanguard split into two on the ninth, with a small force departing to act as a distraction. The army then began to cross the Alps in the coming days. Traditionally the French army took the Col de Montgenèvre (Montgenèvre pass) near Briançon, a long route but one advantageous for the transport of artillery. This pass allowed one to arrive at Susa. Anticipating the French usage of this pass in conjunction with that of the Col Agnel where they were receiving reports of widening actions, the Swiss divided their army into two corps, placing one at Asti and the other at Saluzzo to receive the army as it emerged at Susa. The French army would frustrate the expectations of the Swiss however when on 14 August, Bourbon led the vanguard down the little used Guillestre – Cuneo road through the Col de Vars (Pass of Vars) and Col de Larche (now known as the Maddalena pass). This pass was a very steep and challenging one, and required the disassembling of the cannons, with narrow paths against precipices that forced riders to dismount and lead their horses by the bridle. Pioneers, under the command of the seigneur de Tallard also had to be employed to clear landslides, or widen the path at places that were too narrow. Perhaps 500 horses of the artillery train died during the crossing. The hunt for these alternative passes had begun all the way back in the Spring. Francis had charged the seigneur de Tallard with assessing a passes viability in June.

Shortly before the main royal army completed its passage of the Alps, the small force which had crossed ahead surprised Colonna and routed his force. Francis and the battle had tarried in Embrun after Bourbon's departure until 13 August. With the Swiss now pulling back from their guard of the main passes, the rearguard would proceed by the traditional route, while Francis and the battle traversed the same route Bourbon had taken.

By 11 August, the vanguard had entered the territory of the marquisate of Saluzzo, who had been won over to the French cause by Francis. Making camp at Roccasparvera, the hungry French soldiers under his command pillaged the place. Bourbon, and the vanguard of the army arrived at Cuneo on 16 August, and awaited the arrival of the King there. At this point in the campaign, Francis was to be found with the royal rearguard, and he arrived in Cuneo on 17 August, having told the constable de Bourbon to wait for his arrival before advancing further into Piedmont.

The Swiss were disheartened by the reverses their efforts had experienced and began to withdraw. The 10,000 soldiers in Susa pulled back to Pignerol, joining up with another 16,000 Swiss in the latter place. This combined force then withdrew through Turin, Chivasso and Vercelli, finally settling in Novara. As they withdrew they were ordered to pillage and burn the farms, villages and towns they passed through. The population of Chivasso was massacred by the Swiss. For his part, the constable de Bourbon forbade his soldiers from pillaging the Italian lands they crossed, however some towns would be sacked regardless.

Having emerged in the plain of Italy, the royal army then made for Turin, where Francis was received by his maternal uncle, the comte de Tende. The Swiss meanwhile withdrew from Novara to Milan. After Turin for the royal army came the crossing of the river Sesia which brought them before the city of Novara, which surrendered without a fight to the French on 30 August, though its citadel held out two days. The next day, 31 August, the river Ticino was crossed. The French army was now 20 leagues from Milan. While a pursuit of the Swiss was one possible way forward, Bourbon and the other captains favoured instead establishing themselves in the plains south of the city, thereby allowing a unification with another force under the seigneur de Montpoupon which was to be found around Pavia.

An allied Venetian force, numbering around 7,000 infantry and 830 cavalry made for Lodi, which was undefended, having departed from Padua in June. Francis now opened negotiations with the Swiss through his uncle, the comte de Tende and the maréchal de Lautrec. This negotiation proved fruitful, and an agreement was signed on 8 September by which the Swiss were to vacate Milan in return for 1,000,000 écus (crowns) of which 150,000 would be due immediately. The royal camp was looked through to provide this up front sum with several hundred kilograms of gold collected after several hours, which Lautrec was to take to Buffarola. The Swiss cantons of Bern, Fribourg and Solothurn which boasted a combined force of 10,000 soldiers indeed accepted this agreement. Meanwhile, the central and eastern Swiss cantons, notably those of Glarus, Schwyz and Uri, refused the agreement, still keen to secure booty.

On 10 September, the French army established itself at Marignano (now called Melegnano), where they were to be joined by their Venetian allies. From here, the Spanish-Papal army, which was in Piacenza, under the command of Cardona could be prevented from uniting with the Swiss. Meanwhile, Cardinal Schinner arrived in Milan on 12 September to rally the motivation of the Swiss to continue the fight.

With battle on the horizon, the French army followed the deployment envisioned by Bourbon along the axis of the road from Milan to Lodi. Bourbon's vanguard was located around one of the few hills in the area, fortified behind an embankment with the Gascon arquebusiers, 10,000 of the 22,000 landsknechts and half of the royal cavalry on each of its flanks. In total the vanguard possessed 935 lances, of which 400 were in four large companies: that of the duc de Bourbon, that of Lautrec, that of Trivulzio and that of La Palice. Galiot de Genouillac had charge of the artillery. With the vanguard were many young seigneurs hungry for glory.

A kilometre to the south of Bourbon's vanguard, near Santa Brigida the battle of the army was to be found under the King's command. This portion of the army contained the soldiers of the royal household, the remainders of the cavalry and the landsknechts of the Black Band. The royal rearguard was strung out another three kilometres further south under the command of the duc d'Alençon seconded by the seigneur de Montpoupon (who had been able to achieve juncture with the royal army) and the maréchal d'Aubigny.

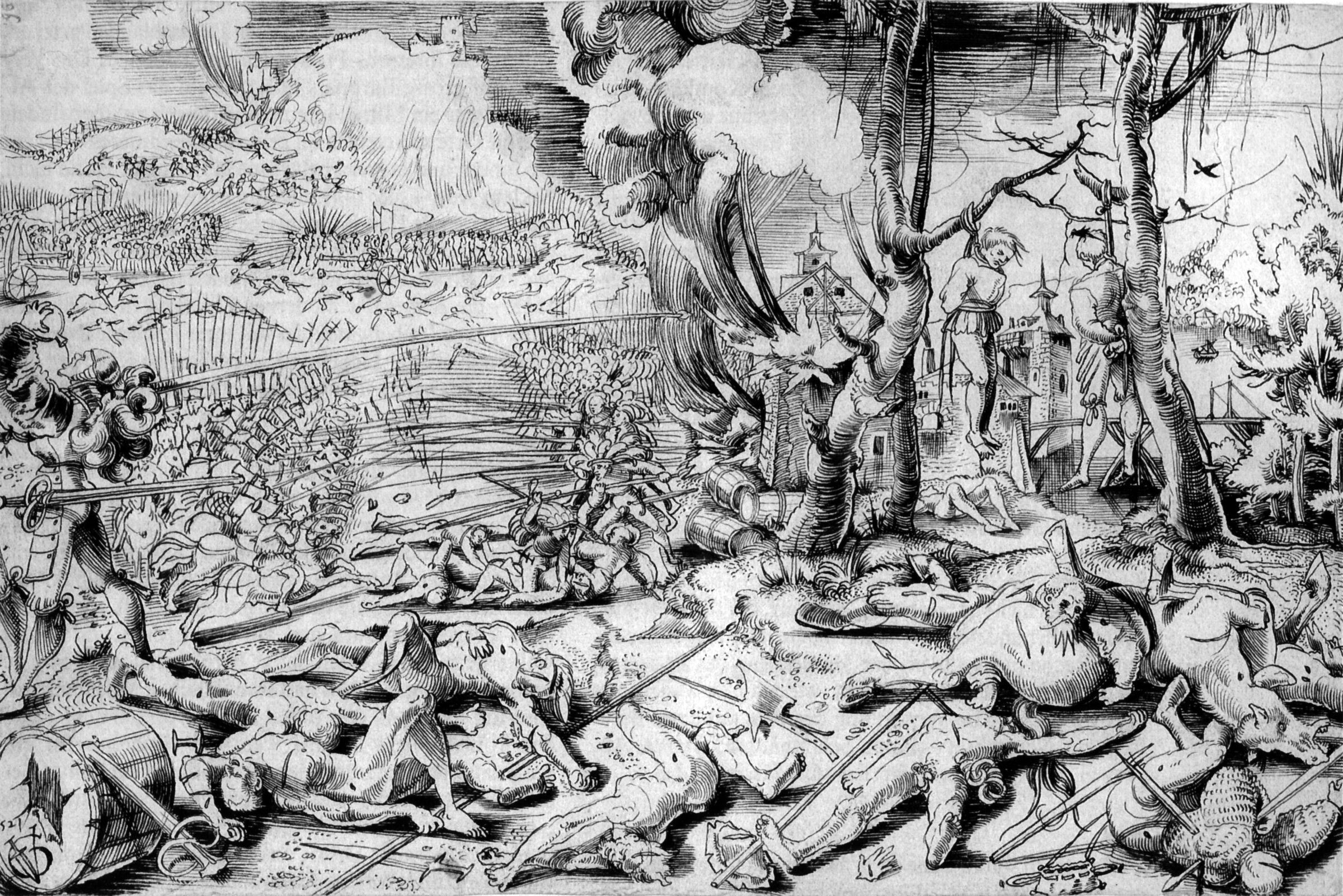
Drawing of the battle of Marignano produced by a Swiss mercenary who may have participated in the battle

On 13 September, this force faced off against a Swiss force numbering around 20,000, with only 200 Papal cavalry and 20 artillery pieces to face the French preponderance of cavalry and artillery. Their famous pikeman were divided into three groups of roughly 6–7,000 which marched one behind the other. Spying the French vanguard under Bourbon, this force left the road and formed up into their columns. They imagined an aggressive assault to seize the French artillery, overwhelming the poor quality French infantry in ground that was not conducive to the French heavy cavalry. The battle began at 15:00, with the Swiss cracking through the infantry of Bourbon's vanguard who were forced back under the cover of the French artillery. Losing heart, some landsknechts abandoned the fight. After only an hour, ten of the royal cannons were in the hands of the Swiss, with Bourbon, La Palice and the other commanders unable to stem the disintegration of the vanguard. Bourbon led cavalry charges into the sides of the Swiss pike squares hoping to dislocate them. The battle was going well for the Swiss, and indeed after two hours it looked to be almost won. It was only with the arrival of the cavalry of the battle of the army under Francis that the Swiss advance was stopped. The stemming of the damage allowed Galiot de Genouillac to relocate the vanguard's artillery in batteries on some heights. To bolster the resolve of the armies landsknechts, Francis supposedly offered them a third of the booty from Milan.

Unusually, the battle continued through the evening into the night. With the moon disappearing behind the clouds around 23:00 the soldiers began to regroup, the fighting pausing as the sides separated. Nevertheless, Navarro's artillery continued to fire, targeting Swiss campfires throughout the night. Only a ditch separated the two armies. The King supposedly spent the night in the saddle, at least according to the letter he wrote his mother Louise. His soldiers would also remain at arms. Galiot de Genouillac worked to reposition the French artillery while Navarro had new ditches and palisades dug to protect it. Bourbon for his part undertook a reorganisation of his companies.

At dawn on 14 September, combat resumed. The ferocity that had typified the prior evening was to be found once again. The Swiss again made their way across the ditch and succeeded in bending the landsknechts backwards. A commander of a compagnie d'ordonannce under Bourbon's command in the vanguard was mortally wounded. Bourbon's horse was also wounded but he escaped the worst of things. Despite these difficulties the right wing of the army under the command of the constable de Bourbon managed to cause one of the Swiss squares to bend. Fortunately for the French by 08:00 the first of the Venetian army arrived on the field. The Swiss abandoned the field a few hours later at 11:00.

Though contemporaries reported wildly divergent figures as concerns the casualties of the battle, Le Roux argues that the best estimates would be that the Swiss lost 8,000 men to the French 6,000 during the combat. Of these 6,000 French losses, more than 200 would be nobles. Among the dead of Marignano was the prince de Talmont, the only son of the vicomte de Thouars, killed perhaps on the second day of the battle. Talmont had been fighting under the command of Bourbon in the vanguard and thus this episode was a further poison to relations between the two men. Also dead was François de Bourbon, duc de Châtellerault, the constable de Bourbon's younger brother.

In the letter Francis wrote to his mother Louise concerning the battle, many captains came in for particular praise for their role in the delivery of victory. This included the duc de Bourbon, but also the duc de Vendôme, the comte de Saint-Pol and the comte de Guise among others. The campaign had proven a costly one for the duc de Bourbon, though this was not abnormal, as it he had also dealt with great campaigning expenses during the reign of Louis XII.

=== Governor of Milan ===
The city of Milan opened its gates to the victorious French on 16 September. The constable de Bourbon was tasked with reducing the castello (or castle) of the city, in which the duke of Milan had taken refuge with several hundred mercenaries. Francis refused to enter the city until this was accomplished. The pioneers of Pedro Navarro penetrated the first enclosure on 26 September, but the duke of Milan simply retreated to the largest tower (called La Roquette) where he resisted until either the evening of 1 October or 4 October. Francis then made his entry into Milan on 15 October. His entry was as king of France, in contrast to Louis XII's which had been as duke of Milan, and he proceeded under a canopy. The now former duke of Milan was granted a pension by the French king and exiled. The following day the chancellor Duprat was made chancellor of Milan, tasked with reorganising the duchy, while the duc de Bourbon was given the responsibility of ensuring the security of the territory.

Facing a victorious French king, pope Leo X became more pliant to dealing with the French. The two sovereigns met in the city of Bologna in December, the King flanked by all the great seigneurs of his court as a show of power, including the duc de Lorraine and duc de Bourbon each of whom was sumptuously dressed. During the negotiations between Francis and Leo, Bourbon was invited to a dinner with his sovereign and the Pontiff as well as several cardinals and the duc de Vendôme. The King reached an agreement with the Pope in the Concordat of Bologna by which the Papacy regained its supremacy over the French church in return for the King's control of benefices being expanded. Elections to bishoprics and abbeys were suppressed in favour of royal appointment which would then be endorsed by the Pope. In the negotiations with the Pope, Bourbon extracted concessions from the Pontiff in the form of a bull dated to 17 February 1516. In this declaration, the Sainte-Chapelle d'Aigueperse (Holy Chapel of Aigueperse) was afforded certain privileges by the Pope.

In December 1515, the Venetians sent an ambassador to the constable de Bourbon, who they held in great esteem. This was done with the goal of allowing them to proceed with their reconquest of the territory of Brescia, as Bourbon could stand in the way of the Emperor. Francis departed from Milan to return to France on 8 January 1516. At this time, Bourbon was appointed as both lieutenant of the King in Italy and as governor of the conquered duchy of Milan. A large force was left under his command in the city.

The contemporary Italian historian Guiccardini alleges that Francis considered leaving his French army in the peninsula under the command of the constable de Bourbon.

In January 1516, the Aragonese king Ferdinand II died. With his death, Francis could imagine the reconquest of Naples, and set to work organising an investigation of the Angevin claim to the throne. However, a more pressing priority emerged in the attempt of the Holy Roman Emperor, Maximilian I, to seize the duchy of Milan. To this end he had raised a powerful army of Imperial and Swiss soldiers, encouraged by the English king Henry VIII who had been alarmed by French successes in Milan. English funds were sent to the Swiss to this effect. Francis, now back in Lyon, sent more soldiers to support Bourbon in Milan.

At the start of March, emperor Maximilian at the head of around 10,000 German and Spanish infantry, with a further 4–5,000 cavalry linked up with the Swiss at Trento. The latter had assembled around 15,000 soldiers. First an attempt was made on the Venetian held town of Asola without success. Abandoning this effort the army made for Milan. The Emperor felt assured that the French were unpopular in Milan and would be subject to rebellions, and that the French aligned Swiss mercenaries would not fight his Imperial Swiss. There was indeed unrest in Milan, and this was a factor in the duc de Bourbon abandoning the defensive line of the Adda to retreat back to the ducal capital. He linked up there with a Franco-Venetian force, and unrest in the city was quelled by the time of Maximilian's approach on 24 March. The Emperor would spend only a little time before the walls of Milan, complaining of his lack of money he protested he could not besiege the city. A few days later he departed, and his army fractured aimlessly. His withdrawal was excused under the pretext of having to attend to the recent death of the Hungarian king. With the threat gone, Francis' hands were freed.

Duc describes Bourbon's tenure as governor of Milan as 'short but memorable' and that one 'could not find a better lieutenant' judging by his correspondence, noting that he re-established order in the territory and proffered support for the Venetians in their quarrel with the Habsburgs. When difficulties emerged with Cremona over the paying of taxes, he approached the situation with flexibility and understanding, something that would contrast with his brutal successor in the charge. By this means, relations were pacified between the French administration and its new subjects.

Despite his successes, Bourbon was desirous to return to France. He noted that the acquisition of Milan cost the lives of many French nobles, and that they were driven out of the place every ten years. Italy was indeed the place of burial for both his brothers (Louis and François) and his father Gilbert.

Bourbon would not remain the governor of Milan for long, being replaced by the vicomte de Lautrec, his 'polar opposite and rival' according to Duc, in May 1516. Francis explained the relief of his constable from the charge through his desire to congratulate Bourbon for his successful maintenance of French control over Milan, as well as keep his most powerful vassal by his side.

== Decay of royal favour ==
=== Travels of the court ===
Bourbon, and Galiot de Genouillac were received with great honours by the queen mother Louise in Vienne upon their return to France. Bourbon would in turn invite Francis to join him in Moulins. The royal party thus set off for Moulins, where they were welcomed by the dowager duchesse Anne and Bourbon's wife Suzanne. She was shown the many delights of the ducal capital. David-Chapy suggests the sumptuousness of Bourbon's court was a cause of both fascination and envy for the queen mother.

By the terms of the 1516 treaty of Noyon, French rights to Milan, and Habsburg rights to the kingdom of Naples, were affirmed by the Habsburg king of Castile (future Holy Roman Emperor Charles V). In addition to the reconquest of Milan, in November 1516 a new perpetual peace was established between France and the Swiss. Going forward the two would be allies, and the Swiss would withdraw from their prior held role in Italian affairs.

The constable de Bourbon was with the King and court for the royal entry into Rouen on 2 August 1517. Departing from Rouen, Francis honoured Bourbon with a stay at Moulins where he participated in the baptism of Bourbon's young son.

In February 1518, the court was to be found at Thouars, the domain of Bourbon's maternal uncle. The vicomte de Thouars organised hunts around his eponymous town. Both the King and the constable de Bourbon participated in these hunts.

In a more elaborate display in April 1518, while the court was residing at Amboise, a mock siege was undertaken. For the occasion, a model town was put under the defence of Francis, and the premier prince du sang the duc d'Alençon with six hundred men under their command. Though a model town, it enjoyed a gun battery and a moat. The assault of the model town was led by the duc de Bourbon and the duc de Vendôme. The fighting that followed was praised by the seigneur de Fleuranges as very approximate to true warfare. This proximity could be seen in the deaths and injuries.

During 1518, the queen undertook her coronation, and Bourbon was present for the occasion.

The following year Bourbon returned the favour the King had shown him at Moulins by his presence for the baptism of Francis' son at Blois.

=== First Imperial contacts ===
In 1519, the young king of Castile, Charles succeeded in his bid to be elected as Holy Roman Emperor, thereby becoming Emperor Charles V. Charles V was greatly desirous to see the restoration of the duchy of Burgundy to his control, a territory possessed by the French crown. The constable de Bourbon would open communications with the new Emperor so that he might receive compensation for the losses his late father had suffered in south Italy (in particular the archduchy of Sessa). The Emperor, in a delicate political position at this time, awarded Bourbon a pension in return for the duc renouncing his rights over the territory.

Around the Christmas of 1519, king Francis was spending time at Bourbon's residence in Châtellerault. Nearby to Châtellerault the château de Bonnivet was under construction and though far from complete, it seemed destined to be a grand construction. The King enquired of Bourbon his thoughts on the château de Bonnivet. This château was unusual in its design, a modern construction akin to the royal projects of the time. This served to illustrate that Bonnivet was a man made by the king, in contrast to Bourbon, a man made by his bloodline. Carouge sees this as a deliberate symbol by the king. Bourbon is supposed to have replied that it was too fine a cage for the bird that would reside in it. Francis sniped that Bourbon was jealous, to which Bourbon retorted that he could not be jealous of a man whose ancestors happily served as squires of his own ancestors. From Châtellerault the court would migrate first to Bonnivet and then to Cognac.

The kings of England and France met one another in 1520 in an event known as the Field of the Cloth of Gold. The two parties having arrived on 7 June, Francis and Henry VIII embraced one another, before retiring to a tent prepared for the pair where they spoke for an hour. Alongside Francis for this intimate moment were only the constable de Bourbon and the admiral de Bonnivet. While Bonnivet would be with the king, Bourbon was entrusted with holding a bare sword at the entrance to the tent. It was unbearable for the duc de Bourbon to see an 'upstart' like Bonnivet whose ancestors served beneath his own to be on equal footing to him. Indeed, while Bonnivet was among the six nobles alongside the King afforded the privilege of a ready made double canvas pavilion, the duc de Bourbon would not be. Another story which comes down from this event is that Henry VIII, seeing Bourbon pass by him with a large troop of gentlemen, whispered to Francis that if Bourbon were a subject of his, he would have him executed. The historian Jacquart does not put weight behind the credibility of this episode.

== Crisis ==
On 28 April 1521, Bourbon's wife, Suzanne would die. This would represent the nucleus of the destruction of the relationship between the constable de Bourbon and the French crown.

=== Remarriage ===
Now without a wife, and lacking an ability to continue his line in the absence of any surviving children, Bourbon looked to find a new marriage. In May, a month after the death of his wife, Imperial agents suggested for him a Habsburg princess. In negotiations, a sister of the Holy Roman Emperor, namely Eleanor of Austria was proposed. Hamon suggests that these efforts may have even begun before the death of Suzanne, as a means for Bourbon to illustrate his vexation with the king. Jacquart supports this arguing, that when Suzanne was ill in 1519, the topic had come up while Bourbon was securing his pension from the new emperor Charles V. In this period, marriages represented strategic alliances. Thus, Francis' anxieties were piqued. In one episode, reported by the English ambassador to Spain, Francis is meant to have interrupted a dinner the duc de Bourbon was having with Francis' wife, the French queen Claude, laying accusations at Bourbon's feet that he had entered into a secret engagement. Offended by the King's accusation, Bourbon accused the King of menacing him without cause and soon thereafter departed court, supposedly accompanied by many nobles. The timing of this episode would have been early in 1523. With the threat of an Imperial match for Bourbon on the cards, it has been suggested that there were royal plans to have Bourbon marry the King's mother, or her sister Philiberte floated around this time. Knecht puts little stock in the 'romantic' story in which Bourbon's scorning of Louise's hand in marriage being the event that put her on the path to 'ruin him'. He argues that rather it is more likely that Bourbon was pressured towards a marriage with a French princess such as Renée the sister of the queen of France, Claude. This would have the advantage of tying Bourbon to the royal family.

=== Succession to the territories ===
With the death of first Bourbon's wife Suzanne on 28 April 1521 without any surviving children, and then her mother Anne a year later on 14 November 1522, her inheritance became an issue of concern for the duc de Bourbon. Francis sent the comte de Lude to Bourbon to express his sympathies upon learning the news of Suzanne's death. In the same manner, the Holy Roman Emperor Charles V sent a certain Philibert Naturelli to offer his condolences. Suzanne had declared her husband to be her heir for all her lands. Jacquart delineates the deceased duchesse's lands into three categories: firstly those lands held as appanages from the crown like the duché d'Auvergne and comté de Clermont-en-Beauvaisis. These lands would typically revert to the crown on the extinction of the line to which they were granted to, but this had been overwritten by the guarantee made by Louis XII in 1498. The second type of lands were those held under matrimonial or feudal conventions like the duché de Bourbon and the duché de Châtellerault. These lands were to return to the crown in the event of the direct/male line of heirs terminating. Finally there were territories held as patrimonies, such as the comté de Forez and du Beaujolais. Transmission of these could be granted to female and collateral heirs at the discretion of the holder. In assessing the relative legal merits of Bourbon's maintenance of the various territories, Le Fur argues Bourbon had a strong case for the dauphiné d'Auvergne, duché de Bourbon, duché de Châtellerault, comté de Forez, Beaujolais seigneurie de Bourbon-Lancy and the principality of Dombes. Beyond this he places in an ambiguous category lands the Bourbons had acquired through confiscations from the house of Armagnac, chiefly the vicomtés de Carlat, Murat, Carlades, Marche and Montaigu-en-Combrailles. Finally he indicates an incontestable royal right over the duché d'Auvergne and Clermont-en-Beauvaisis.

Francis would indeed move to reclaim the royal appanages of the duché d'Auvergne and comté de Clermont-en-Beauvaisis. Meanwhile, Francis' mother Louise (the first cousin of Suzanne) asserted herself as the late duchesse's heir for those territories she held as patrimonies on the grounds of being her closest living relative. She first began to explore the possibility of pursuing legal action towards the annulling of Suzanne's will in June 1521. She ultimately made this claim in April 1522, on the tail end of the year and a day of Suzanne's death, which was the time limit prescribed for asserting such claims. She had laid the groundwork for this manoeuvre through the commissioning of a genealogy of the house of Bourbon from a certain Étienne Le Blanc. This work described Charles de Bourbon as only the comte de Montpensier, rather than the duc de Bourbon and noted that Suzanne had died 'without heir'. The fact that Louise's mother Marguerite had renounced her Bourbon inheritance upon her marriage was brushed over. The future Chancellor Guillaume Poyet would serve as her instrument in the prosecution of this lawsuit, as would the famous financier the baron de Semblançay. This hunger for Suzanne's land represented a betrayal of the agreements made with the Bourbons by Francis' royal predecessors.

=== Two lawsuits ===
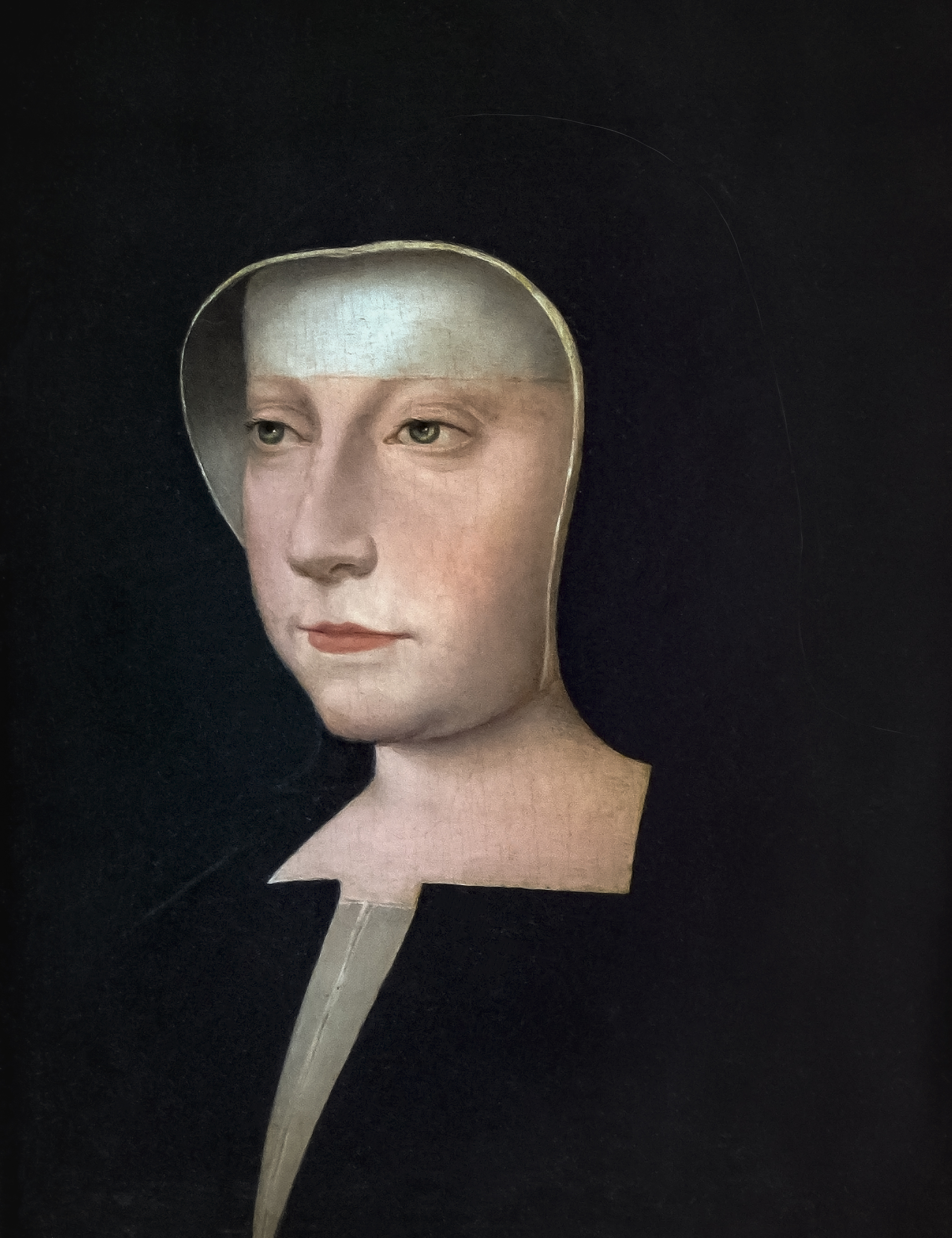
Louise de Savoie, mother to the king, and competing claimant for parts of the inheritance Bourbon looked to receive from his late wife Suzanne

Francis moved to reclaim the comté de La Marche, and vicomté de Carlat, two cases where the law was clear that these reverted to the royal domain. Two separate lawsuits were then brought before the parlement of Paris concerning the inheritance. They came to the parlement of Paris as Bourbon was a peer of the realm, and thus the case could not go before any other court. One was brought by the king, the other by his mother. Louise's lawsuit opened in April 1522, the constable de Bourbon was summoned to appear before the parlement. The first lawyer the constable de Bourbon looked to was a certain Bouchart, however he withdrew from the case during 1521 and was replaced by a lawyer named Bourlon.

Louise's lawyer, Poyet, argued Louise was a closer relation of Suzanne than the Constable, and set customary and written law against each other.

In August 1522, Poyet requested the court sequester from the duc de Bourbon the lands that were contested, appoint administrators and conduct an inventory of the titles and furniture. The parlement only went ahead with the inventory. Matters were postponed until the resumption of hearings on 11 November.

Louise's lawsuit was prejudiced on 7 October 1522, when the King accepted his mother's homage for the duché de Bourbon and Auvergne in addition to the comté de Clermont, Forez, Beaujolais and La Marche; and the vicomtés de Carlat and Murat. By this means, even before the parlement had come to any decision on the merits of the case, almost the whole patrimonial inheritance was recognised as falling to Louise. On 26 November, Francis further awarded to Louise several lands that were contingent on the succession of the recently deceased dowager duchesse de Bourbon (chief among which the seigneuries de Creil and Gien) as well as the incomes of the salt granaries of Moulins. There was a legal contradiction in the awarding of these lands to Louise, as it implied that they had come to her via the crown, while Louise's lawsuit was arguing that Suzanne's lands defaulted directly to her. This royal manoeuvre was repeated on 10 January 1523, when Francis granted to Louise the comté de haute and basse Marche, and the vicomtés de Carlat and Murat. These royal acts were put before the parlement on 26 January, and were only registered with reservations. While the Constable was likely in contact with segments of the parlement that chafed at this royal 'tyranny', he never sought to employ them towards a general cause.

Bourbon made a visit to the court in Paris with bundles of paper around this time.

The parlement first issued an ambiguously worded arrêt (decree) in the matter of the inheritance dispute. The body had often expressed its disquiet at the way the case was being handled. From the end of February 1523, the case was adjourned.

The case was again adjourned for the Autumn on 6 August 1523, the parlement keen to avoid the case being prejudiced by the crisis of the kingdom. Then, on 30 August, the parlement likely ruled for the sequestering of his property, despite what Hamon describes as "obvious reluctance". The historian Roger Doucet was unable to explain why the parlement changed its tune and caved to the interests of Louise in this manner. Knecht suggests it may have been a result of her having been declared regent of the kingdom on 12 August. By this means, the revenues of the Bourbon lands were granted to the crown for an indeterminate length of time. The decision itself does not survive, but it is referenced in several contemporary sources. As to the reason it does not survive, Knecht proffers two possible explanations, either it was not registered as a form of protest against the pressure being exerted on the court by the crown, or it was registered via a lost secret register. This decision of the parlement was a godsend to Francis, as it allowed him to take advantage of the duc de Bourbon's revenues, at a sensitive time for royal cash-flow.

In a remonstrance made several years later, on 10 April 1525 during the regency of Louise, the crown was urged not to interfere with the judgements and rulings of the court and that confiscations not validated by the court should be reversed. David-Chapy sees this as a thinly disguised rebuke of the way that Bourbon's lands had been sequestered in 1523.

=== External crisis of the kingdom ===
French control of Milan was lost to the forces of Prospero Colonna on 21 November 1521. Francis thus arranged for a new campaign into Italy. Command of this army was the most prestigious military posting. Bourbon would be snubbed for the role, which was granted to the vicomte de Lautrec. In addition to this snub, none of the four great military governorships established at this time were granted to him. The loss of Milan was soon to be compounded by the failure of a new offensive towards the city which culminated in the disastrous battle of Bicocca on 27 April 1522. This reverse was followed by the loss of Genoa to the Hispano-Imperials.

Instead of Italy, Bourbon was sent to take command in the northern province of Champagne. His cousin the duc de Vendôme joined him for this mission, in a role akin to that of a supervisor.

Things did not proceed well in Champagne, with the sovereign lands of the duc de Bouillon being overrun by the Imperial commanders, the count of Nassau and von Sickingen. On 27 August, Mouzon fell to this Imperial invasion, the army then moved on a three days later to Mézières which had the potential to act as a gateway for the Imperials to much of Picardy. The fall of Mézières was not acceptable to Francis and he ordered the re-supply of the besieged city from his base in Reims. To this end, Bourbon was summoned to come to Reims with 6,000 infantry and 200 cavalry. With a relief effort led by a certain de Lorges proving successful, the Imperials withdrew from the city on 27 September. The French king now set off in pursuit of the retreating Nassau at the head of a royal army of 30,000 men. Negotiations between Francis and the Emperor went nowhere, neither side offering proposals that were acceptable to the other.

The French army marched on Valenciennes in battle formations on 19 October. In armies where the King was present, command of the vanguard was the right of the Constable. Rather than giving the vanguard to Bourbon, Francis instead gave it to the premier prince du sang, the duc d'Alençon. The rearguard was under the command of the duc de Vendôme, and Bourbon was at the King's side in the battle of the army. The King justified the decision not to provide the vanguard to Bourbon on the grounds that he wished to have the Constable by his side.

As this army advanced, Francis was alerted to troubles in Bapaume, and therefore a force under the comte de Saint-Pol, the seigneur de Fleuranges and the maréchal de La Palice were peeled off from the army. They destroyed the town. Vendôme did similarly to the town of Landrecies. By now the French army was in Imperial territory and this warranted a response from emperor Charles V, who came to Valenciennes to face off against this incursion. There was now a real possibility of battle between the French and Imperials.

Hoping to make forward progress, Francis ordered the building of a bridge over the river Scheldt. The Emperor responded to this by the dispatch of 12,000 landsknechts and 4,000 horse. These forces were too slow, and French forces were already to be found under the command of Saint-Pol in the marshes on the other side of the Scheldt. The vanguard came across shortly after. The choice of battle now sat before Francis. The duc de Bourbon, the maréchal de La Palice and vicomte de Thouars all pushed for him to pursue battle. By contrast, the maréchal de Coligny advised against this course, and it would be his advice that was followed, not Bourbon's. Though there would be no battle, Francis permitted his captains to pursue the retreating Imperial soldiers as they fell back towards Valenciennes. Around this time Charles V took his leave of Valenciennes.

The day after the Emperors withdrawal the duc de Bourbon and the King seized Bouchain, while Vendôme fell on and conquered Somain. The vicomte de Thouars attempted to capture Douai, but the weather did not permit success in this endeavour. The French army then began to withdraw to the Somme. By mid-November, Francis had withdrawn to Compiègne. The final military act of the campaign season for the French was conducted by the duc de Bourbon, who seized Hesdin.

This happy end to the campaign was soured by the capitulation of Tournai to the army of the count of Nassau on 16 December after a siege of five months. The bad news of Tournai was compounded by the fact England had committed itself some weeks earlier on 24 November, to join the war against France alongside the Emperor in the next year.

During the campaign, Francis had failed to give battle both to Charles V, and had also failed to do so when the opportunity arose several days later against Nassau. Bitter at the usurpation of 'his command' of the vanguard by the duc d'Alençon, Bourbon is supposed to have spread the rumour that the mediocre results of the campaign followed from the King's poor choices of favourites. Bourbon had found his military advise for the campaign, to pursue a lightning offensive on the northern frontier was also disregarded by the king.

At some point in 1521, the seigneur de La Bourdaisière was appointed as trésorier (treasurer) of France. La Bourdaisière was a man of Louise. In securing this appointment, La Bourdaisière's rival was the constable de Bourbon. It thus gave great pleasure to Bourbon's enemy, the admiral de Bonnivet to see him frustrated for access to this office.

=== Between France and the Empire ===
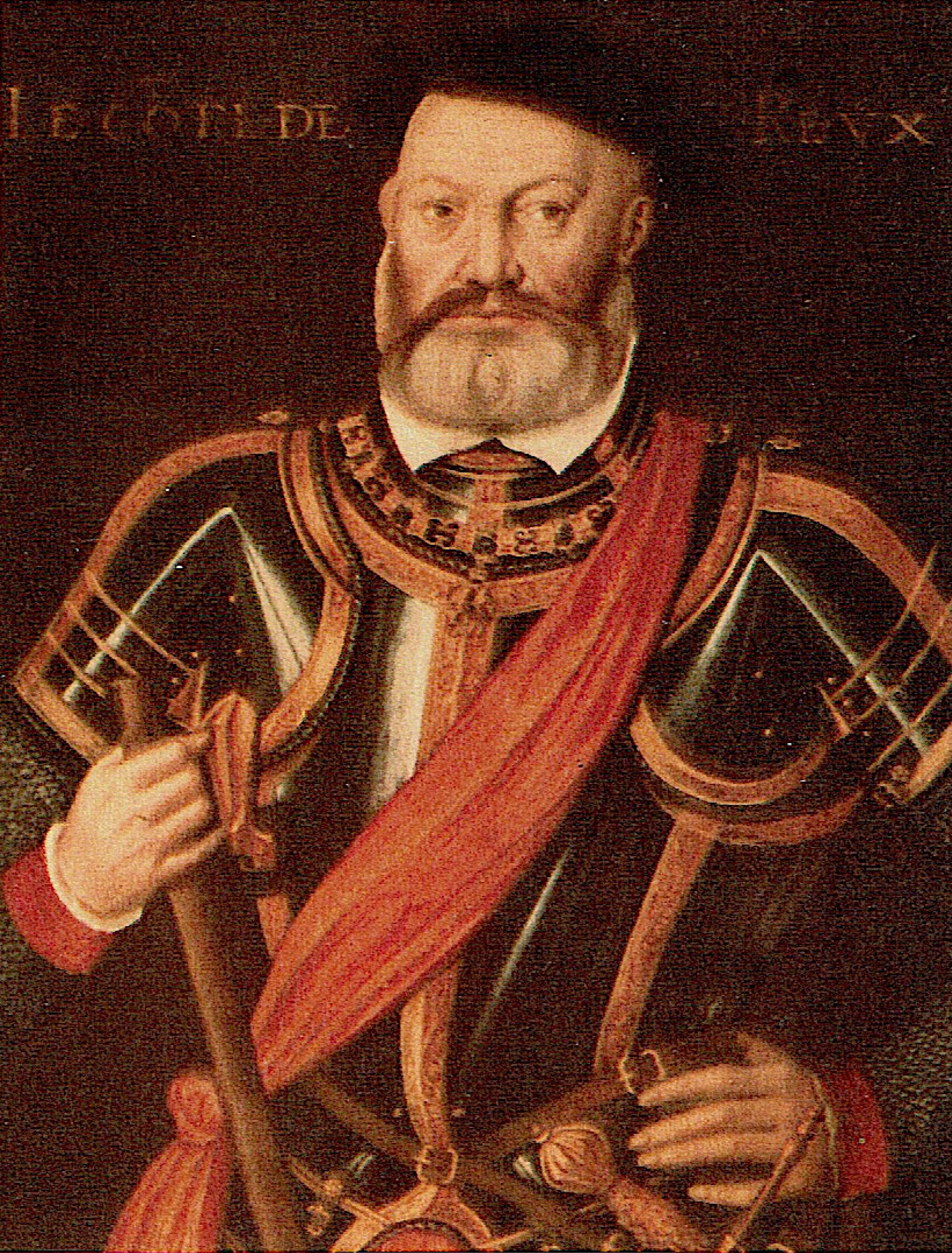
Comte de Rœulx, Chamberlain to the Holy Roman Emperor Charles V and lead negotiator with the disaffected duc de Bourbon

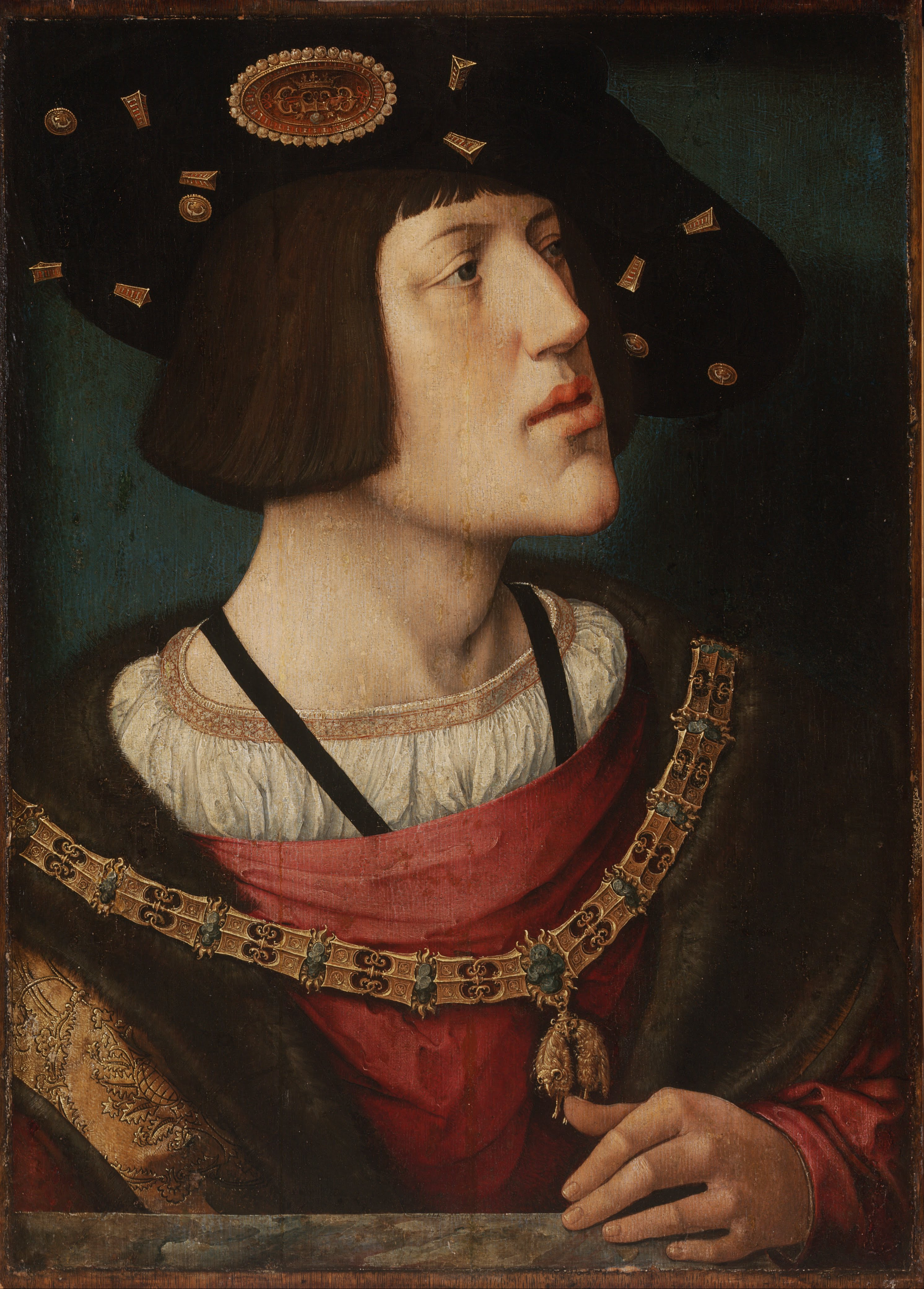
Charles V, Holy Roman Emperor in 1519

No military commands would be forthcoming to Bourbon in 1522 on the Italian front in Genoa and Milan, or on the Navarrese front, or on the Picard front. The Constable would be left in Paris. In the summer of 1522, Bourbon opened communications with the Emperor. During August, two of his associates (the seigneur de La Vauguyon and the seigneur de Lurcy) met with the Imperial chamberlain the count of Rœulx on the northern frontier. Bourbon made it clear he was willing to take up arms against Francis, devoting 10,000 infantry and 500 men-at-arms to such an enterprise, but Charles V did not take up the offer at this time. During the Autumn these contacts redoubled, now with both the Emperor and with the English king Henry VIII.

Per a memorandum from Henry VIII to the earl of Wiltshire in December 1522 the levy of troops in favour of Bourbon was discussed.

The exploratory negotiations that Bourbon had been conducting reached the ears of Francis. While it appears to Le Roux that they were undertaken with the intention of pushing the King towards a recognition of his constable's services, this backfired. Francis was not interested in having a 'dialogue with an equal' but rather a compliant subject.

From December 1522 to April 1523, the comte de Saint-Pol endeavoured to serve as the axis around which would turn the reconciliation between the constable de Bourbon, and the king Francis.

In January 1523, the cardinal Wolsey of England wrote to the English ambassador in Spain. He opined that Bourbon was a virtuous prince for his desire to fight the abuses of the French crown and to reform the realm so that the poor people might be relieved.

Alongside his cousins, the duc de Vendôme and the comte de Saint-Pol, the constable de Bourbon would see to the re-supply of Thérouanne in Picardy with the required victuals during March.

Bourbon's defiance of the French king, and negotiations with the Emperor were little kept secrets by the spring of 1523. The Emperor was now prepared to explore more serious negotiations. Bourbon came to the capital in March 1523, looking to ensure the preservation of his assets. During his stay in Paris he had either one or two interviews with Francis. According to the seigneur de Fleuranges, the King was sympathetic to the duc de Bourbon. Francis was to have urged him to allow the trial to follow its course and assured him of his benevolence. The English ambassador recorded the meeting differently. In his account Francis chided his constable for his matrimonial negotiations and dealings with the Emperor Charles V. To this reproach, the duc de Bourbon is to have replied by describing it as a threat. The constable de Bourbon took his leave of the King on 27 March 1523. He had been tasked with a humiliating responsibility of clearing the bands of bandits in the areas around Paris as well as Provins and Brie. He would see those menacing these communities arrested and killed.

The constable de Bourbon confided in the bishop of Le Puy in May 1523 that he could no longer anticipate fair treatment by the king. In this eventuality he would surrender his charge of constable, and his collar of Saint-Michel, and retire to the Holy Roman Empire. In this withdrawal of protest, he anticipated a thousand French nobles would withdraw alongside him.

In the summer of 1523, Francis had been preparing to undertake a new campaign into Italy. To this end the large majority of the soldiery was concentrated for the purpose, leaving provinces such as Picardy thinly defended. The defection of the Constable would frustrate this ambition.

== Betrayal ==
=== Final chances for settlement ===
The count of Rœulx, Imperial chamberlain, was dispatched to directly negotiate with the duc de Bourbon. The two men met on 11 July at Montbrison. With Bourbon for these negotiations were the seigneur de Saint-Vallier, the bishop of Autun, the bishop of Le Puy, the seigneur de Saint-Bonnet, a certain de Grossonne and several others. The present men took an oath over a fragment of the true cross provided by the bishop of Autun. The duc de Bourbon signed the agreement with the Imperials on 18 July. By its terms, 10,000 Imperial landsknechts would cross the French frontier in the south entering either Languedoc or Burgundy, while a simultaneous invasion of the kingdom from the north would be launched by the English. Bourbon would command the landsknechts of the south. England would subsidise this campaign to the tune of 100,000 écus, and Bourbon would receive a matrimonial alliance with a sister of Charles V. The Emperor's sister would come with a dowry of 200,000 écus, however Bourbon would have to provide for her a yearly stipend of 20,000 écus derived from the Beaujolais. Saint-Bonnet was tasked with travelling to meet with the Emperor to confirm this marriage proposal with him, though he would turn back before completing this mission. Jacquart asserts that Bourbon was to lead the landsknechts to conquer Dijon, the capital of the duchy of Burgundy for Charles V. Jouanna argues that the intent for Bourbon of entering into this arrangement was to improve his bargaining position with Francis. Hamon suggests similarly that the Constable tried in vain to indicate to Francis that he was open to some sort of settlement. The negotiations with the Emperor were intentionally a poorly kept secret, as they were in reality intended to be known by Francis, their true target. By worrying the French king to a strong enough degree, he would re-establish dialogue with his vassal. Jouanna makes further note that this stratagem of induced dialogue had achieved success before, and would achieve success in the coming decades of the French Wars of Religion and the regency of Anne in the seventeenth-century. It was the particular character of Francis that doomed the project.

=== Bonnivet mission ===
On 21 July, Bourbon wrote to the seigneur de La Clayette, the lieutenant of his compagnie d'ordonnance, apologising that he could not travel to the court to settle his dispute with Francis. Rather, he noted his willingness to meet with the admiral de Bonnivet. Bourbon was to meet with Bonnivet at Roanne but Bourbon excused himself on grounds of illness (little desiring to enter the Gouffier heartland as Roanne was the domain of Bonnivet's brother). Rather the Constable requested Bonnivet meet with him at Montbrison instead. By refusing to go to Roanne, Bourbon was symbolically illustrating his refusal to compromise with the king. While this was transpiring, Saint-Vallier was dispatched to join with the King in Lyon.

Francis was well aware Bonnivet represented everything Bourbon detested about royal authority. The choice of Francis to dispatch the admiral de Bonnivet, had thus represented a declaration of war against the Constable in the form of the messenger of compromise.

Carouge opines that the Constable had likely resolved on his departure from France before the arrival of Bonnivet at Montbrison. With the Admiral presenting to Bourbon an uncompromising attitude during his visit, his defection had certainly been resolved upon by the time Bonnivet had returned to court.

=== Spector of civil war ===
In the final months and weeks before his betrayal, Bourbon assembled arms at his strongholds of Chantelle and Carlat. Cannons were introduced and certain levies of men conducted. Some of his young advisors and bishops in his party counselled him to raise the standard of revolt. Quilliet speculates that at this time there was a real risk of civil war that was only narrowly avoided. As part of these preparations, emissaries were sent out into other parts of the kingdom to bring other nobles into his fold. In Picardy, he enjoyed relations with the governor of Boulogne, the seigneur de La Fayette. Potter suggests that the proximity between Bourbon and La Fayette had caused the loss of control over the sénéchaussée of Boulogne for the latter back in January 1523. In Normandy, the seigneur de Matignon and Argouges were sent to meet with the seigneur de Lurcy who would prepare Normandy for the English invasion. The seigneur de Saint-Saphorin was sent to Vaud so that he might oversee the raising of 4,000 more foot soldiers. It was to be the seigneur de Montpoupon who would occupy Dijon. These outreach efforts would backfire in the case of two Norman nobles who were contacted. The seigneur de La Clayette also appraised the crown, and, in a warning to Louise dated 26 July, he informed the queen mother that Bourbon had stationed 50 men-at-arms in Chantelle and Carlat and was stockpiling food and artillery. Ultimately, nothing would come of these preparations.

The Imperial regent of the Netherlands, Margaret of Austria, often discussed with her nephew the Emperor Charles V those she felt liable to join with the duc de Bourbon in his revolt. Among the great names she proposed in September were the king of Navarre, the duc de Lorraine (brother-in-law of the duc de Bourbon), and the duc de Vendôme. According to du Bellay, Francis was suspicious of the allegiance of the duc de Vendôme in the case of a betrayal by the constable de Bourbon. He therefore delegated the vicomte de Thouars to the province of Picardy (over which Vendôme was governor) with the powers of lieutenant-général. The vicomte de Thouars had a particular hatred for the constable de Bourbon that he had cultivated in the final years of the reign of Louis XII. This usurpation of his authority displeased Vendôme, who travelled to court to protest his loyalty. Satisfied by his protestations, the King sent Vendôme off to see to the defence of Champagne. The duc would be back in charge of Picardy by November. At one point, it would be falsely rumoured, that his brother, the comte de Saint-Pol, had joined with the duc de Bourbon in his defection.

At the start of August the possibility of reaching an arrangement between Bourbon and Francis still appeared to be open.

=== Meeting at Moulins ===
Two Norman seigneurs who were aware of Bourbon's plans, appraised the bishop of Lisieux of what they knew in the context of confession. They informed the bishop that a powerful figure in the kingdom who was a prince du sang was to rebel in favour of a foreign invasion, and that the King's life was in danger. The bishop decided to abandon the confidentiality of confession and appraised in turn the comte de Maulévrier, who was the sénéchal of Normandy. On 10 August, Maulévrier thus sent word to Francis, who was moving south to Lyon for the coming campaign. On 12 August, Francis arrived in Gien. While staying in this city he announced that his mother would enjoy the control of the regency, as she had in 1515, during the coming campaign in which he would be absent in Italy to 'reclaim his duchy'. The seigneur de La Vauguyon offered the King a cryptic warning during his stay in Gien on 12 August. To this disguised warning, Francis responded that were he as suspicious as his forebear Louis XI he would have much reason to distrust the constable de Bourbon. Maulévrier's correspondence reached the queen mother at Cléry on 15 August, who forwarded it on with word of her own. His envoy raced to catch up with the king, catching him at the Bourbon territory of Saint-Pierre-le-Moûtier on 16 or 17 August. Though the King now had proper confirmation of his vassal's betrayal, for a few days now he had been aware that Bourbon had met with an English agent in the Forez. He wrote to his mother noting that the warning she and Maulévrier had provided was a timely one, as he had been planning to stay with the Constable at Moulins. This meeting would now go ahead with a different atmosphere. Indeed, it would go ahead despite Francis' likely knowledge Bourbon intended for his kidnapping. Francis feigned trouble with his leg so that he might delay his entry to Moulins, thereby allowing the seigneur de Warthy to assemble a band of landsknechts before the King went to meet with Bourbon. In total between five and six thousand men were assembled. In addition, the young duc de Longueville was entrusted with scouting the nearby countryside. On 20 August, Francis met with his errant vassal at Moulins, Bourbon was to be found in a state of actual sickness himself, being bedevilled by a tertian or quartan fever. Bourbon's physical weakness was to his advantage in the confrontation. He could not represent a threat to the king in such a state and this thus made it hard for Francis to prosecute justice against him, particularly on the basis of unconfirmed reports. Nevertheless, the meeting was filled with mutual suspicion. Our account of the meeting comes from a testament given to the parlement on 31 October by the seigneur de Brion. Francis assured his constable that he did not believe any of what Maulévrier had told him, and invited the Constable to head his army for the coming march into Italy. By this means, Bourbon would be forced from his shell to demonstrate the loyalty towards Francis that he professed. Bourbon was aware, that in the chivalric climate of the time, it was not possible for Francis to accuse him of felonious conduct without proof. Bourbon is to have replied with a certain degree of honesty that he had indeed been propositioned by the count of Rœulx on behalf of the Emperor, but had declined their proposal. He promised that he would join with Francis in Lyon for the campaign as soon as his doctors felt his health permitted it. Taking leave of his constable, Francis entrusted the seigneur de Warthy with keeping an eye on Bourbon. The next day, Francis departed for Lyon, arriving on 22 August, and around this time, Bourbon withdrew to his fortress of Chantelle. Repeated requests for Bourbon's presence in Lyon were then made, but these were ignored by the duc. Jacquart speculates word of the sequestering of his assets, which reached him at the start of September may have caused this refusal to show in Lyon.

=== End of royal patience ===
On 3 September, the King sent the seigneur de Warthy to Bourbon a second time, both to enquire as to Bourbon's health, but also ascertain the reason for his constable's continued delay. Another declaration Warthy was to make was an indirect accusation. The King was aware of landsknechts massing on the border of Burgundy, and had resolved to peel off several thousand of his own troops so that any enterprise they might undertake would be doomed. Thus, without accusing Bourbon directly, he illustrated to the Constable that if he undertook an enterprise, it would be foiled. Warthy found Bourbon near Varennes at Saint-Gérand-de-Vaux. Here, Francis' agent was regaled concerning the Constable's dire medical condition, and assured that Bourbon had only delayed his progress towards Lyon by a single day. Though likely ordered to remain with the Constable until he arrived at Lyon, Warthy, aware of how well advanced the situation was, hurried back to report to the king. In the hope of warning Bourbon of his imminent arrest, a certain servant of his at the royal court named Espinac raced to give him notice. Bourbon's journey towards Lyon would be reversed after he reached Lapalisse, the Constable protesting he was too unwell to continue, and he would return the way he had came.

On 5 September, Francis ordered an explanation from Bourbon of his conduct. While the Constable himself would not yet be arrested, his accomplices in Lyon (the seigneur de Saint-Vallier, the seigneur de Montpoupon and the bishop of Le Puy) were, and they were immediately interrogated on 6 September by a commission of the président Brinon of the Rouen parlement and two maîtres des requêtes de l'hôtel - master of requests, a type of legal official (Guillaume Budé and Guillaume Luillier). The maréchal de La Palice and the bastard of Savoy, the comte de Tende, were instructed to head from Lyon to the fortress of Chantelle. For his part, Bourbon played host to an English emissary, with whom he entered into alliance. La Palice resolved not to proceed beyond his namesake town of Lapalisse, instead sending the baron de Curton onward to Chantelle so that he might invite Bourbon to undertake talks. Bourbon was no longer to be found at Chantelle however. With word of Bourbon's flight, a pursuit was launched, though it did not last long before its abandonment as Bourbon's location was unknown. La Palice occupied Chantelle and then made for Moulins where he proclaimed that Bourbon's lands were seized.

=== Flight ===
On 7 September, Bourbon withdrew his allegiance to Francis from his fortress of Chantelle. His illness was a feigned one by this time. Yet even at this late hour, he wrote letters to many principal personages of the court: the king's mother, Louise; his sisters, Renée de Bourbon, duchesse de Lorraine, and Louise de Bourbon, princesse de La Roche-sur-Yon; the royal official Robertet, the chancellor Duprat and the maréchal de La Palice. For the King he sent the bishop of Autun as his messenger. Upon arrival before Francis, the bishop was immediately arrested. In these various correspondences he apologised for the grief he was causing the recipient through his betrayal, and justified his act as only seeking to assure himself of what was rightfully his. In his letter to Louise he implored her to intervene on his behalf with the King to restore him to Francis' good favour and begged that his goods be left unmolested so that he could devote them to the service of the king. During the night of 7 to 8 September he made his flight from the kingdom, only accompanied by a handful of servants (Potter lists them as Lollières, Pelloux, La Chuse, L'Hôpital, Godinière, Pompéranc, Buzançonais, Bartholomé and Guinot), making first for Carlat, perhaps in the hopes of entering Spain. His initial suite had involved an escort of 240 horsemen, but they were instructed to make their own way to Carlat and dispersed. On 11 September, Francis ordered the arrest of Bourbon himself. A reward of 10,000 écus was offered for his capture. The interrogations of those of his accomplices who had already been arrested in Lyon led to Francis ordering that the duc de Bourbon be hunted down. Having wandered for a little while in the mountains of Auvergne he abandoned his attempts to reach Carlat, and with a single follower (Joachim de Pompéranc) instead made to cross the Rhône near Vienne. By 23 September, he had arrived in Chambéry, and from there into Imperial territory a few days later at Saint-Claude where he declared himself to be at the service of the Emperor. On 8 October, he was at Besançon (part of the Imperial county of Burgundy). The following day, he informed the Swiss cantons that going forward he was a disciple of the Emperor Charles V. During this month Francis would make discreet efforts to try and win him back over to his cause, but without effect. Just the same, Bourbon's plan to invade the kingdom from the east came to nought, the landsknechts that had been promised him by Charles V having largely deserted. By 20 December, Charles V was appraised that the duc de Bourbon was in Italy, where he was advising the Imperial commander in the peninsula de Lannoy, viceroy of Naples.

=== Treason? ===
The historian Sournia describes Bourbon's grievances as "well-founded", and notes that the desertion of such a great prince du sang was unprecedented in times of such tension. Duc and Rizzo note that his disgrace by the King betrays the latter's poor understanding of political and strategic affairs as concerned Italy. The historian Jouanna cautions against using the term 'treason' to describe Bourbon's departure from allegiance to Francis in favour of that of the Emperor, arguing that not only would it to be anachronistic for the period, which lacked much in the way of a national sentiment, but also that Bourbon was a subject of both the king of France, and the Emperor (for his three Imperial territories including the principality of Dombes, parts of the Beaujolais and Trévoux). The duc de Bourbon was thus a member of the 'international nobility'. The Emperor, was a descendant of the last duke of Burgundy who also had experience being despoiled by the French crown. Jacquart argues in contrast to Jouanna that a 'nascent patriotism' and therefore national sentiment can be witnessed at this time, and is evidenced by the failure of the duc's vassals to join Bourbon's rebel cause.

=== Rebels and loyalists ===
The flight of Bourbon would have a small impact on France. The crown remained in a position of strength, with his new enemy isolated. Bourbon tried to bring along other great seigneurs into his defection. This wish would be in vain, and his defection would be an isolated one. For example, the seigneur d'Alluye, whose family owed much to Bourbon, remained above the fray of involvement. Alluye would later be rewarded by the queen mother for this. Unlike the great rebellions of the prior century, that of the Mad War and the War of the Public Weal, Bourbon offered no manifesto that might provide a political character to his rebellion. For Jouanna, the fact that Bourbon was unable to induce the kind of noble rebellion in the vein of the Mad War of the previous century, speaks to the strong bond between the King and the wider nobility in this period. While he had few collaborators, Hamon notes that it is liable that many nevertheless sympathised with his revolt.

Bourbon's principal accomplices included the following men. The bishop of Autun, the bishop of Le Puy, the seigneur de Saint-Vallier (captain of two hundred archers of the royal guard), the seigneur de Montpoupon (captain of a hundred men-at-arms) and seigneur de La Vauguyon (maréchal and sénéchal du Bourbonnais (marshal and seneschal of the duchy of Bourbon). Crouzet argues that La Vauguyon, while sympathetic to Bourbon's cause, remained somewhat aloof of it. This was likewise also true of the duke of Savoy.

The choice of Bourbon to side with the Emperor was followed by the prince d'Orange. Orange would be captured by the Genoese during the Imperial invasion of Marseille in 1524. After several years in captivity he would be released in 1526 as a term of the treaty of Madrid. Another noble to join him in flight from France was the comte de Penthièvre who had a separate grievance with the French crown for failing to restore him to the territories that had been confiscated from him by the duke of Brittany for his support of the French king Louis XI in the War of the Public Weal. The son of Saint-Vallier, a certain baron de Sérignan also passed into Imperial service with the duc de Bourbon.

The maréchal de La Palice was put in a sensitive position by Bourbon's betrayal. Bourbon was his overlord, and several of his relatives (his uncle the seigneur de Montpoupon, his brother the bishop of Le Puy and his brother-in-law the seigneur de Saint-Vallier) had defected with the Constable. Indeed, he had been the recipient of one of the letters Bourbon sent out on 7 September.

The general population in Bourbon's various holdings, would not rise up for his cause. Quilliet considers the various reasons for this failure of subjects to follow the lead of Bourbon. He suggests that feudal ties in this period were not quite as tightly bound as they had been in the past and that a cautious hesitancy to involve oneself in adventure were the chief factors. He notes that others have drawn from this non-event the advent of a 'national consciousness', with the people in Bourbon's lands displaying a higher loyalty to France. Though they would not rise to join with him, contemporary songwriters unleashed invectives at the chancellor Duprat for his role in Bourbon's disgrace, meanwhile Bourbon and those who had betrayed France with him were held in sympathy particularly in Paris by both the parlementaires and common people. In the capital, Bourbon's plight was the subject of sympathetic songs. Not all contemporary writers deplored the King for his actions. For example, the memorialists Guillaume and Martin du Bellay were favourable to Francis' actions as regarded Bourbon.

Out of fear that Bourbon's territories might rise up, the duc d'Alençon and the duc de Vendôme were tasked with campaigning in the duché de Bourbon and d'Auvergne.

=== Stamping out the embers ===
On 11 September, the arrest of Bourbon for the crime of conspiracy was officially proclaimed. Francis would portray Bourbon as a disloyal subject. It was to be the maréchal de La Palice and the comte de Tende who were to effect his arrest. La Palice was at the head of 4,500 infantry and 500 cavalry as he went to Moulins to receive the arrest of Bourbon. La Palice then made for the Dombes, and received an oath of loyalty from the inhabitants and toured the various other domains of the departed duc de Bourbon.

Returning to Francis in Lyon, La Palice was rewarded for his loyalty with receipt of the offices vacated by the fled duc; the governments of the duché de Bourbon, the duché d'Auvergne, the Beaujolais, the Forez and the Dombes. Wanegffelen diverges from Knecht on this point, stating that the government of Auvergne, Bourbon and La Marche went to the duke of Albany.

== In Charles V's service ==
=== English invasion ===
On 19 September 1523, the duke of Suffolk invaded Picardy with an army of 30,000 men. A concurrent invasion was launched in Champagne under the command of a certain Fürstenberg with 10,000 landsknechts menacing the province before they were stopped by the comte de Guise. This force had been intended to supplement whatever army the duc de Bourbon raised. While the northern English thrust would be of alarm to the Parisians, the English vanguard perhaps reaching as close to the capital as Pont-Sainte-Maxence only 50 km away from the capital during October, it lacked the kind of coordination required to deliver more than a scare, with the English army retreating at the onset of an early winter. During those troubled days for the capital, with food scarce and the King absent, a certain degree of sympathy for the fugitive duc de Bourbon was to be found. He was a man of "wisdom, virtue and valour" who had little choice but to betray the kingdom thanks to the rapaciousness of the chancellor Duprat.

On 11 November, Francis compounded his condemnation of Bourbon in letters patent. To stem the possibility of any rebellions in the ducs favour, the baillis, prévôts and sénéchaux (baillifs, provosts and seneschals) of France were granted permission to break up gatherings of 10 or more armed men, using lethal force if they felt it necessary.

Royal propaganda at this time, worked to cleave apart the memory of 'the traitor Bourbon' from that of the king. In the narrative of Champier, the King was implied to have been tainted by the coronation ceremony at Reims, where he was made a knight by his constable. This tainting was overridden when the King was supposedly knighted again by Bayard on the field of Marignano, thereby separating Francis from the 'traitor'.

=== Trial of the 'traitor' ===
As a peer of the realm, only the Paris parlement could try Bourbon. The King wanted exemplary and quick justice to be delivered, so as to best dissuade others from imitating the path that the duc de Bourbon had taken. On 11 September, he appointed a special commission for the handling of the investigation led by the prémier président of the parlement, de Selve who would thus play a central role in the trial. De Selve was supported by two conseillers and maîtres des requêtes. Bourbon's trial in absentia at the hands of the parlement of Paris would begin in Paris on 8 to 9 March 1524. The vicomte de Thouars, Bourbon's uncle, was one of the présidents for the royal lit de justice session.

The parlement wished to maintain the forms of justice, while the King looked for vigorous prosecutions for Bourbon's accomplices. Their slow pace was not to the liking of Francis, or the chancellor, who harried them to speed up their work. On 20 October 1523, Francis suggested they might used torture to 'extract the truth' if they felt it prudent. After being addressed by the seigneur de Brion on 31 October, the président Baillet responded that Bourbon must have been misled by those that surrounded him into following an erroneous course. Jacquart finds this soft approach to Bourbon revealing as to Francis was hesitant to entrust the wider parlement with the trial. The parlement was again harried on 1 November, to abandon their adherence to the 'forms of justice' that interfered with the needs of the state. The commission resisted the King's badgering, and looked to get the case before the wider parlement so that regular justice could transpire. Francis retorted that this was not the time and place for such an approach. By 7 December, the commission considered that it had concluded its work. By now Francis had come around to a more legal approach for the case, and on 20 December put the matter before the court in its entirety. The performance of the future chancellor Poyet, as well as those of a certain Lizet and Montholon, during the trial of Bourbon came in for rebuke from the lawyer Étienne Pasquier. Pasquier derided these men's contributions to be jumbled and confusing. Similarly the historian Doucet finds Poyet's contributions to be drowned in technical references to Roman and canon law at the expense of legibility. In contrast to Poyet, Montholon was making the case for Bourbon's defence at the trial. Poyet's enthusiasm for the prosecution of the case earned him royal favour, and he would later be rewarded with the position of chancellor of France.

One of the witnesses at Bourbon's trial was a certain financial official responsible for the province of Languedoc named Jehan de Poncher. Poncher had become a prisoner of the duc de Bourbon and spoken with him several times in early 1525.

The King held lit de justice (special sessions of the parlement over which the King presided) sessions of the parlement on 8 and 9 March 1524. During the first lit de justice, the arrest of Bourbon was ordered. The renegade duc was summoned to appear before the body, and the seizure of all his property was announced. Come the second, Francis protested the leniency of the sentences handed down on Bourbon's co-conspirators, requesting these sentences be amended. When the parlementaire de Selve tried to outline the action taken against the co-conspirators he was interrupted by the chancellor Duprat who inquired whether their property had been confiscated. When the parlementaires responded that it had not, Francis protested that this was not a typical civil suite and effected both the royal person and the kingdom at large. The parlement was unmoved by this, and it would not be until April that those who had fled (the seigneur de Lurcy, Lallière, Montbardon and Le Peloux to name some of them) would be declared to be in default. The verdicts already handed down were confirmed by other courts. On 16 May, Francis ordered a retrial be conducted, with 19 new judges (largely pulled from the parlement of Toulouse, Bordeaux and Rouen assigned to the case. The parlement fired back by appointing thirty of its own members alongside the new nineteen, and refusing to review any of their earlier pronouncements. Francis was furious at the parlement for their attitude as related to the prosecution of the co-conspirators, and refused to allow them to publish the sentences they had produced, or release any prisoners on 10 July. The parlement published them anyway. On 13 August 1524, it was declared that those who had fled were to be sentenced to death. This was immaterial though, as they were not in the courts power to execute.

The trial of Bourbon, which had paused, resumed in July 1527 after his death, at the request of the prosecution.

On 10 July 1527, the procureur général (attorney-general) declared that Bourbon had shown ingratitude towards Francis, that he had besmirched the King and that he had harboured those who spoke ill of Francis. This ingratitude manifested in his desire to renounce the office of Constable, the honour of the collar of the Order of Saint-Michel, and his correspondence with Charles V. The duc had faked an illness at the time of the 1523 campaign, so that he might have an excuse not to invade Italy alongside Francis. Had his designs come to pass, Francis would have been imprisoned by the duc de Bourbon and then put to death alongside his sons. Beyond these personal attacks on the sovereign he had conspired to see the kingdom invaded from many directions and lead other French seigneurs into joining the attack on France. These charges were all familiar ones from prior trial sessions. Since his defection he had committed new offenses, including the invasion of Provence, participation in the battle of Pavia and conducting attacks on a French ally by his siege of Rome. These were added on to the list. Due to his death, Bourbon could not be physically punished, and therefore would have to be subject to the process of Damnatio memoriae. The trial ended on 12 July. On 24 July 1527, the King held a new lit de justice in the parlement. For the occasion the whole court was gathered in the Grand-Chambre for a session presided over by the king. During this royal session, the parlementaire Charles Guillart argued that while the King was above and not bound by the law, it was nevertheless desirable that he not use this absolute authority when it was not necessary. Francis and his council shot back that afternoon that the court should only concern itself with justice, and it had no cognisance over matters of state. A specially chosen selection of baillis and sénéchaux were present for the trial in the grand-chambre of the parlement. His crimes were to have occurred in their jurisdictions. On 26 July, the deceased Bourbon was summoned to appear before the parlement, or to present a representative before the body. With neither Bourbon nor a representative appearing, the court would get down to work, and they validated the judgement of 10 July. Only five peers were present for the moment, nevertheless the whole parlement was present to give it the suitable solemnity. The following day, on 27 July 1527, Francis had the parlement declare Bourbon guilty of lèse majesté, rebellion and felony, with his assets and territories definitively taken over by the crown, something that the parlement had not declared in previous sessions. His titles were posthumously stripped from him and his coat of arms were to be struck. The exemplary posthumous punishment of the duc de Bourbon served as an illustrative warning to the nobility at large.

Starting on 30 August, Bourbon's punishment was carried out. Anywhere in the kingdom of France where Bourbon had territories, the pronouncement was read out. His coats of arms and other manifestations of his presence were destroyed where they were found. The royal commissioner took possession of Bourbon's lands on behalf of the king, with office holders in the territories removed from their charges. These office holders were then restored to their charges after taking a new oath (to Francis this time). The application of the punishment had concluded by December 1527.

This damnatio memoriae extended to the narratives written after 1527 also. Bourbon was written out of the French accounts of the victory at Marignano. When he was mentioned at all it was solely as leader of the vanguard. For example, in Jacques de Mailles' telling, it was said that he was thought to be dead at the start of the battle.

=== Trials of the accomplices ===
After the initial interrogations of 5 September, various warrants for arrest were sent out around the kingdom. In total around thirty people would be imprisoned as a result of the investigation. These co-conspirators were put on trial, which would feature men such as Pantaléon Joubert (a président in the Toulouse parlement) on the jury. On 8 September, a certain d'Argouges was questioned, and replied that when approached by a representative of the duc de Bourbon he had rebuffed the envoy, arguing that he was loyal to his king and country. Having resolved to allow the parlement to handle the case, the various prisoners were transferred from the château de Loches to the Conciergerie and Bastille on 20 December 1523. The seigner de Saint-Vallier was the first to be condemned by the parlement. On 16 January 1524 he was sentenced to death with his property to be confiscated. Before his execution he was to be grilled for names he might not have yet given up. He was however judged to be too weak to torture, and thus on 17 February he was taken to be beheaded at the Place de Grève. As he was being led to the scaffold, he received a royal pardon, to the pleasure of the Parisians who little desired to see him suffer. He was granted reprieve on the grounds of his son-in-law (the comte de Maulévrier's) services to the crown. Contemporary chroniclers reported a lurid tale by which his daughter, the future mistress of king Henri II, Diane, gave herself to the King so that he might spare her father. Saint-Vallier's pardon was only for the death sentence, he was sentenced to remain under arrest for the rest of his life, receiving food through an opening in the wall. The seigneur de Montpoupon was released on condition that whenever required he would return to court. The seigneur de Saint-Bonnet got ahead of the judicial apparatus by denouncing everyone, he was thus pardoned by the king. The seigneur de La Vauguyon would be kept under house arrest from 1524 to 1526 before being rehabilitated. Though he was suspected of being the first offender in the negotiations that began in 1522, there was a lack of proof. While those who had attended the meeting at Montbrison in July were guilty of not having disclosed the plot to the king, they could argue they had a competing duty as vassals of the duc de Bourbon. The parlement thus handed down many light sentences to others. For the bishops (Autun and Le Puy), it would be necessary to put them before a church court to try them (as the secular investigators had protested their lack of cognisance over such a trial), something complicated by the recent death of Pope Adrian VI. The bishop of Autun, whose name was blackened by his role in Bourbon's enterprise, would enjoy a rehabilitation in time. He was pardoned in 1527. The bishop's brother, Raoul, gave his thanks in March 1528 to the baron de Montmorency for his part in the salvaging of his brother's reputation. The fate of the bishop of Le Puy is unknown. In the end the trials of Bourbon's accomplices yielded one pardon, two acquittals, a handful of light sentences, with the rest of the accused on the run. Jouanna feels the treatment of those who had gone along with Bourbon in his defection was of a more moderate nature than that delivered against Bourbon himself.

=== Legacy of suspicion ===
Bourbon's betrayal left a lasting impression upon Francis. Nawrocki suggests that even decades later, the King may have been reticent to place a relative like the comte de Saint-Pol in a place of paramount favour, due to the persistent memory of Bourbon's acts. Durot goes further, and suggests the emotional distance Francis' son Henri II had towards the 1548 marriage of Jeanne d'Albret, queen of Navarre and Antoine de Bourbon, duc de Vendôme as a legacy of the memory of Bourbon's defection. It also served as a valuable ideological tool, French defeats in the years 1523-1527 could be explained as a product of his defection.

For a brief period, the famous knight Bayard would experience a kind of disgrace, being viewed as having been too proximate to the constable de Bourbon by the crown. However he would soon be back on campaign in Italy under the admiral de Bonnivet.

Some of the fruits of the duc de Bourbon's despoilment made their way as royal gifts into the hands of royal favourites like the great financier the baron de Semblançay, the royal treasurer the seigneur d'Alluye, and the lawyer Brinon who received the lands of Rémy, Gournay-sur-Aronde and Moyenneville near Compiègne.

This rebel for the Imperial cause enjoyed fiscal support from the duke of Savoy, who lent him money. This was despite the fact that Savoy was the uncle of the French king. This was one of the episodes that alienated Francis from his uncle.

=== Disastrous Italian campaign ===
The defection of Bourbon, and various other pieces of bad news, had meant that Francis had to reconsider his plans to leave the kingdom in the hands of his mother. The King could not depart from France into Italy in such circumstances. The admiral de Bonnivet would be entrusted with command of the army in Italy instead.

In Italy, the French army under the command of Bonnivet would initially enjoy success in their invasion of Lombardy. The duc de Bourbon joined with the Imperial command in this theatre, alongside the marquis of Pescara and the viceroy of Naples de Lannoy who enjoyed overall command, and to whom Bourbon was subordinate after the death of Colonna. French fortunes saw a reversal for a multiplicity of reasons including troubles with their Swiss allies, the spread of plague in their camp, the Pope's support for France's enemies and Bourbon's enthusiasm to prosecute the attack against the French. Bonnivet was forced onto the backfoot, and engaged in a retreat towards Novara in March 1524, with the duc de Bourbon leading the attack against the French. The French infantry began to desert, and their Swiss allies made clear their intention to withdraw back to Switzerland.

The Imperial pursuers pounced on the retreating French as they withdrew across the river Sesia on 29 April, bringing them to battle at Romagnano. De Lannoy was convinced to launch an audacious camisado attack by the duc de Bourbon, however the French commander Bonnivet was appraised of this intention, so it would not be a complete surprise. In the battle, the guns of the Spanish infantry triumphed over the French heavy cavalry. The admiral de Bonnivet, commander of the army, was wounded and forced to go ahead of the army back to France. Carouge argues that he had a strong fear that if he had remained with the army and been captured, the duc de Bourbon would have had him killed. Meanwhile, the famous knight Bayard was fatally wounded while leading a charge against the Imperials. According to the contemporary narrative of Symphorien Champier, who published biographies of Bayard in the 1520s a meeting is supposed to have occurred between the fatally wounded Bayard and the duc de Bourbon. Bourbon assured the wounded Bayard that he would ensure the best surgeons treated him, and cautioned the man against falling in to depression. Bayard is then supposed to have retorted that he had faith in god, and that his only cause for grief was that he might no longer be able to serve Francis. The knight then requested that Bourbon leave him be, so that he might pray to god for forgiveness for his sins. Du Bellay recounts Bayard's remarks in more pointed terms. In his narrative the dying man addresses Bourbon "you need not pity me, for I die a worthy man; it is I who pity you, for you have betrayed your prince, your fatherland and your oath".

On 24 May 1524, a great conflagration consumed the city of Troyes. Though the fire was likely an accident, it was attributed to Bourbon and 'Imperial agents'. Bourbon was also alleged to have stolen away with all the artillery of the kingdom, having tucked it away in a Savoyard town for his upcoming invasion. Fears of a fifth column in the province inspired the vicomte de Thouars' brother Georges de La Trémoille, who was the lieutenant-général of Burgundy to keep a close eye on the wine growers of the territory.

=== Invasion of Provence ===
The possibility now seemed to loom of an Imperial invasion into Burgundy. Bourbon, who had been established as lieutenant-general in Italy for the Emperor, had other plans though. The duc intended instead to invade Provence while an English invasion into the Somme was led in parallel. In this grand plan it was to be Charles V's brother, the archduke of Austria Ferdinand who was to invade Burgundy with German soldiers. Further parallel attacks would come from the Emperor himself across the Pyrenees. It had been centuries since an invasion was launched from Italy outwards across the Alps. Provence was a recent addition to the kingdom of France, having been united with the French crown only a few decades earlier in 1481. Bourbon therefore imagined he might be greeted as a liberator of the territory, and in addition to this assured his allies the exhausted French would revolt upon the invasion. Bourbon's invasion would represent a personal affront to the French king Francis. Bourbon had demurred for some time on the matter of recognising the English king Henry VIII as king of France, rebuffing the matter on 28 May when word of the first delivery of money from England was delivered to him on grounds it might alienate his supporters. On 25 June, financial support for the army of Italy caused the duc de Bourbon to concede on this point. He assured Richard Pace that he would work towards seeing the crown of France be placed on Henry's head.

On 10 May, Francis charged the maréchal de La Palice with the role of lieutenant du roi in Dauphiné so that he might protect the province against the duc de Bourbon.

Bourbon conducted an invasion of Provence with eight hundred men-at-arms, fifteen hundred light horse, twenty thousand German/Spanish infantry among which were landsknechts and heavy artillery. This army took the Col de Tende as its passage through the Alps then crossed the Var river to enter Provence on 1 July. The coastal route via Nice was followed. Vence, Cannes, Hyères, Grasse, Fréjus, Lorgues, Brignoles, Antibes and Draguignan fell before the advancing army. Resistance was only to be found at Brégançon, the tower of Toulon and Cassis. Parts of his artillery were transported by ship, and were caught by the French fleet. Several of the ships ran aground in their efforts to avoid capture, and the artillery was only recovered by fierce combats on the beach that almost cost Bourbon his life. The undefended capital of Provence, Aix, was surrendered to him by the city consuls on 7 or 8 August. Bourbon took the title of comte de Provence the next day, which was to be one of the titles which fell to him by the division of France. From Aix, Bourbon wrote to Charles V, inciting him towards beginning his campaign. Henry VIII received similar urgings from the duc. Having conquered Aix, Bourbon made to take Marseille, where much of the Provençal nobility had withdrawn, and which had received a garrison of Gascons, French and Italians. Indeed, Francis had dispatched the condotierri commander Renzo da Ceri and the French noble the seigneur de Brion with 200 men-at-arms and 3,000 infantry to bolster the place. The occupation of Marseille was the key to receiving reinforcements by sea, as well as ensuring a solid control over Provence. The Imperial light horse arrived before the city on 4 August. Provençal nobles from Grasse came to the commander da Ceri to report to him the imminent arrival of Bourbon. The main body of the Imperial army under the command of Bourbon and the marquis of Pescara arrived before the walls on 13 August. Bourbon placed the landsknechts against the sea, while the Spanish soldiers lay in the plain of Saint-Michel. The first artillery shots against the walls were fired six days later, on 19 August, marking the beginning of the siege.

=== Siege of Marseille ===
The invasions that were meant to come in parallel with that of Bourbon's failed to materialise. Henry VIII, who was very cautious by nature to begin with, had his favourite the cardinal Wolsey worked on by several emissaries from Louise. Meanwhile, the Emperor was struggling for cash and had other matters on his plate such as the Ottoman threat in the east and social unrest in the Holy Roman Empire. He was thus slow in raising troops, and nourished Bourbon with little more than fine assurances.

Bourbon's army would stall out before the walls of the city which was vigorously defended by da Ceri and the French commander the seigneur de Brion. Brion represented Francis in the city, but da Ceri called the shots. Bourbon established himself on the heights overlooking Marseille. The cities ramparts had been repaired and the place was well served for gunpowder and victuals, with a militia (numbering some 9,000) and population involved in the cities defence. In addition to these boons, the French fleet was to be found in the cities harbour, and the Genoese ships under the command of Andrea Doria maintained a vigil over Marseille enabling the city to resist a complete blockade. Bourbon by contrast found himself in want of funds and facing an opponent making use of a scorched earth tactics. The artillery bombardment brought forth by Bourbon's army was intense, with three hundred shots sent against the walls on 23 August alone. This bombardment succeeded in opening a breach in the walls near the convent of the Observance. While an assault through the breach was greatly feared by the inhabitants, none came. Da Ceri oversaw the building of earthworks and trenches near the breach, allowing a new line to be established overnight and it was then sealed. With high morale in the city, enabled by the strong reserves of victuals, Bourbon was mocked in song. Meanwhile, the French king was assembling a relief army. Bourbon now looked to change his tactics, seeking to utilising mining to compromise the walls instead. Beginning on 27 August, the Marseillais began leading sorties against their besiegers. Bourbon asked for prisoner exchanges, and while this was refused by da Ceri, the defending captain asked for the trade of the corpse of a captain named Vincentio Romano (who had died in a sortie) in return for the remains of three Imperial officers. This proved agreeable and a brief truce transpired during which the bodies were traded.

The siege then resumed, but it was not a constant progression of assaults. Attacks were only launched every couple of days, with the rest of the time being devoted to trench work.

Throughout these months, the French king was moving south: from Bourges on 25 July to Vienne which he departed on 12 August to before the walls of Avignon on 14 August. He was now able to assume a more tight command over operations against the duc de Bourbon.

The occupation of the Papal enclave of Avignon was looked to for the aid it could provide to the supply and concentration of the French army. The leaders of Avignon had been put in a difficult spot, caught in a pincer between the French army, and that of Bourbon, something they bemoaned in a letter of 7 August to pope Clement VII. Avignon was not keen to afford entry to the French, and had to be written to by Francis to yield to occupation. First the maréchal de La Palice had been sent to negotiate with the consuls of the city, this having failed it would be the vicomte de Thouars who succeeded in obtaining the keys to Avignon. By its subduing, Bourbon was denied a place of retreat. During Francis' stay in Avignon, he would have two servants of the duc de Bourbon who had fled there executed. He then continued the march south with the maréchal de La Palice commanding the vanguard and the vicomte de Thouars (who had been recalled from his government of Burgundy to face off with Bourbon) the battle. La Palice utilised reconnaissance so as to best organise his defence against the duc de Bourbon.

On 16 September, the Imperial bombardment resumed. Bourbon was at this time feeling confident still. Toulon had just fallen to the Imperials on 2 September (with several big guns captured that were transported to the siege efforts in Marseille) and Henry VIII was assuring him of his imminent invasion of Normandy. The situation was frustrated for the attackers on 17 September, when 1,500 reinforcements slipped into the city, bringing supplies with them. Bourbon was keen to take Marseille before the royal army reached the place. A new breach was made by the Imperials on either 21 or 24 September, however the area was quickly reinforced by da Ceri and the seigneur de Brion and after some Imperial casualties at its entrance no assault would come through it. While Bourbon considered offering battle to the French king, his captains persuaded him against the idea.

The French army would remain largely inactive after its advance south, and would only enter action again once Bourbon resolved on 28 or 29 September to abandon the siege. The artillery was variously abandoned, carried on the backs of the soldiers or shipped to Genoa. With the camp of the besiegers now empty, the population of Marseille descended upon it, taking everything they could find. The French army pursued the retreating duc de Bourbon. The royal army tarried for a few days in Aix, which had earlier capitulated to Bourbon. Here, the maréchal de Montmorency massacred the Spanish contingents of the routed Imperial army. The consul de Prat was put to death for having sworn loyalty to the duc de Bourbon. With the encouragement of the admiral de Bonnivet, Francis resolved to make the passage over the Alps himself so that they might also receive the benefit of reconquering Milan. According to Le Roux, Bonnivet likely hoped by this means to bury the memory of his dismal campaign of the previous year, while the King imagined a new Marignano. Later, in 1527, Francis would explain the drive into Italy as something he had been compelled to do due to the criminal duc de Bourbon.

Despite Bourbon's defeat before Marseille, the siege was a wake up call to improve the defences of the city. The crown resolved to establish two new fortified complexes near the city.

Bourbon's rearguard, under the command of the marquis of Pescara was snapped at by the pursuing French light horse under the command of the maréchal de Montmorency and infantry commanded by Bussy d'Amboise as it retreated down the road to Nice. Bourbon re-crossed the river Var in the first days of October.

=== Triumph at Pavia ===
Movement of the French and Imperial armies during the Pavia campaign

Back in Italy, Bourbon was reunited with the Imperial commander de Lannoy who had remained in the peninsula during his invasion of Provence. De Lannoy was as aware as Bourbon was of Francis' invasion plans, and therefore the two distributed the Imperial forces through the strategic cities of Alessandria, Pavia, Como, Lodi, Pizzighettone and Cremona. It was assumed Francis would throw his troops strengths at these places before making any attempt on Milan. The capital of the duchy was for now ravaged by plague, complicating its defence.

Francis and the French army, numbering over 30,000 men, invaded Italy again in Bourbon's wake. Their crossing over the Alps went smoothly, and was followed by the successful occupation of Milan, which contrary to de Lannoy and Bourbon's expectations, the French beelined strait towards. The Imperial forces in the area were outnumbered and took refuge in Lodi and Pavia. Bourbon for one was to be found in Lodi. Instead of going to besiege Lodi as he was being advised by the maréchal de Montmorency, seigneur de Fleuranges and comte de Saint-Pol; Francis followed the recommendation of the admiral de Bonnivet and the duc d'Alençon, and looked to starve out the city of Pavia. Pavia was a more glorious target for Francis. The city was a great Ghibelline (Italian faction that favoured the Imperial cause) stronghold and thus the garrison could be assured of the population. The vicomte de Thouars was left to garrison Milan while the royal army proceeded on to Pavia.

At the start of February 1525, Bourbon and de Lannoy dispatched the comte de Rœulx to England to negotiate for the invasion of Picardy by Henry VIII in the coming spring. By this time however, Henry VIII was already undertaking negotiations with the French and was more interested in these prospects. He therefore declined the inciting he received from the Imperial agent.

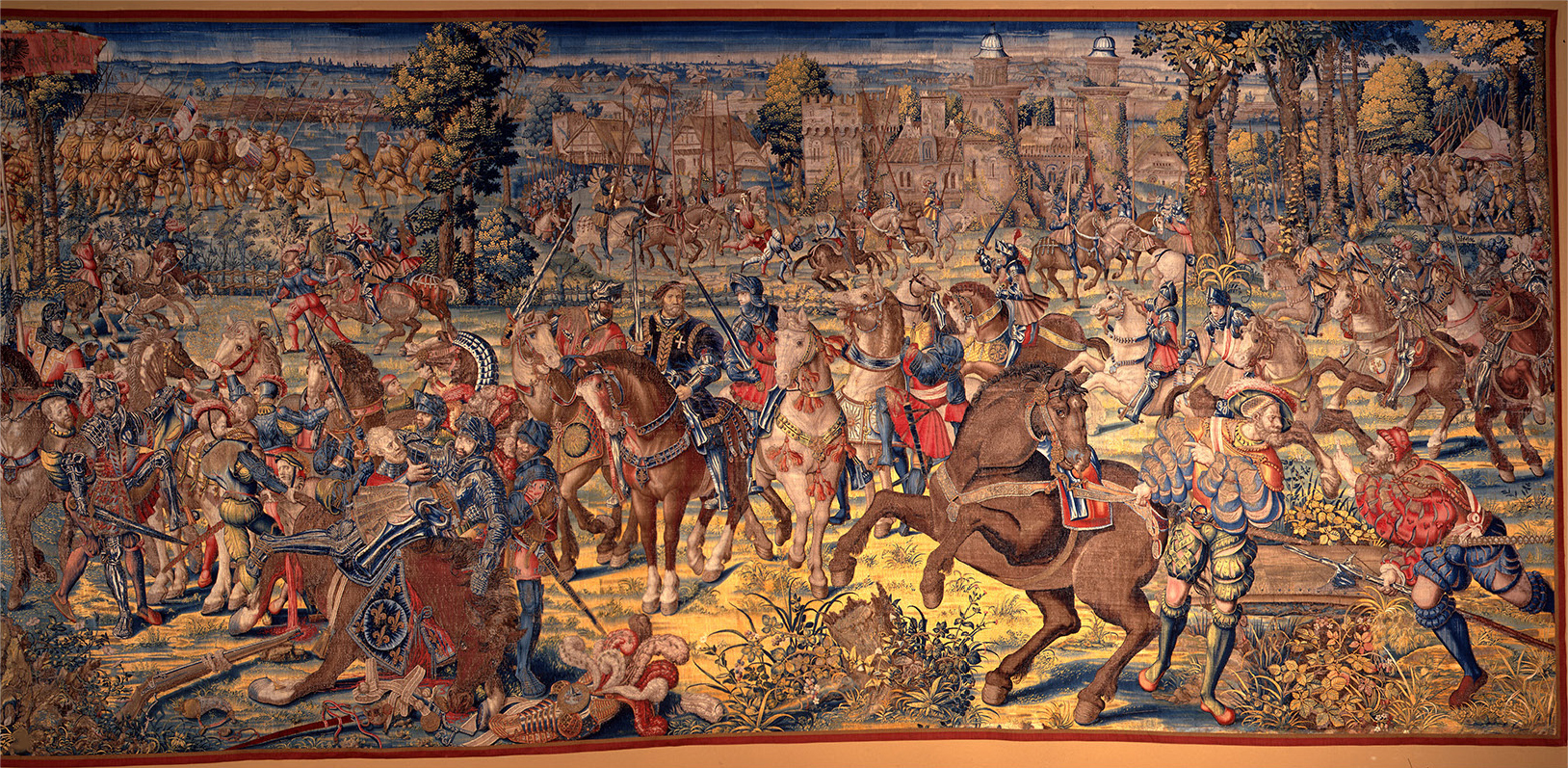
Contemporary tapestry of the Battle of Pavia showing the capture of the French king, the duc de Bourbon is almost to the very right of the image, spurring his horse which has fleur de lys on its coat

The city of Pavia was defended by the Imperial commander de Levya. While Pavia was under siege, the Emperor and the duc de Bourbon were not idle. Bourbon, alongside the other Imperial commanders in Lodi, Pescara and de Lannoy built an army to rival the French one. To this end Bourbon had departed Lodi into Germany so that he might meet with the archduke of Austria. He returned to the theatre on 10 January 1525, at the head of between 8,000 and 12,000 landsknechts raised from Tyrol having taken the route of the Adige valley. The force assembled was a polyglot one of Germans, Italians, Swiss and Spaniards. Inside Pavia, the garrison was getting restless for want of pay, but Bourbon having returned, was able to assure them they would soon receive their money, even if he did not actually have any to provide them. Now the Imperials almost equalled the French in numbers, and began to act that way. Cassano, was seized by the marquis of Pescara with ease. Confident in victory, Francis dispatched a force under the duke of Albany to proceed down to Naples. On 22 January 1525, the Imperials made an attack against the French camp. This assault was easily rebuffed. Proper battle was felt to be an inevitability, something the French hungrily anticipated. Venetian forces were placed on the road to Lodi in the hopes of preventing any further Imperial reinforcements. Around the end of January, the Imperial army under Bourbon, de Lannoy and Pescara conquered the castle of Sant'Angelo on the road between Lodi and Pavia, by which they would be able to assure themselves of their supply while camped out east of Pavia. Come the start of February, the Imperial army under Lannoy's command, bolstered by the landsknecht mercenaries, established itself at the north of Visconti park, arriving at a time when the Imperial garrison of Pavia was beginning to falter. Bourbon established his camp at Torretta, in front of the French royal army. On 4 February, an Imperial assault on the gates of the park was rebuffed. More successful was a mission to cross the siege lines into the besieged Pavia on 7 February, the soldiers bringing enough gunpowder brought to allow de Levya to make more sorties. The French besiegers of Pavia were transformed into the besieged. They lost steady streams of their mercenaries as the days passed. Things were not smooth sailing for the Imperial camp either. De Lannoy was unable to pay his landsknechts, and along with the duc de Bourbon he felt that the prospect of a retreat now seemed something to consider. On the night of 19 February, the marquis of Pescara assaulted the French camp with 3,000 Spaniards, succeeding in putting several hundred men out of action. The garrison of Pavia was now in such a ruined state that it was threatening to hand the city over to the French if they were not relieved. With limited resources themselves, Bourbon, Pescara, and de Lannoy resolved on 23 February to launch a camisado (a surprise night attack) against the French. Francis was not unaware of a coming Imperial attack that night. The ultimate purpose of this attack is unknown, it may have been intended to break through supplies into Pavia, or to force a decisive showdown with the French besiegers. Le Fur argues in favour of it being an operation intended to secure the castle of Mirabello as an intermediate point between de Lannoy's army and Pavia, with the fighting concluded before daybreak. To the end of this endeavour the Imperial army broke camp at 22:00 that night, with the plan of seizing Mirabello castle in the park which had been abandoned by the French. From here, reinforcements could be brought into Pavia. The Imperial pioneers set to work on the walls of the park around midnight. After five hours the various holes in the wall they had made were wide enough for the Imperial soldiers to make their way through. A force under the marquis del Vasto hurried for Mirabello castle, a kilometre away from the breaches. Mirabello was conquered for the Imperials by about 06:30. Bourbon and de Lannoy would be in command of the Imperial cavalry for the coming battle.

The contours of the famous battle to come are very obscure, and have presented a challenge for historians to reconstruct.

Around 06:00, the alarm was sounded in the French camp, soldiers soon armed and saddled up. The Imperial cavalry was making its way towards Mirabello under the command of de Lannoy, Bourbon and Pescara with their infantry to one flank and the Vernavola stream to the other. At about 07:00, the Swiss mercenaries of the French army succeeded in seizing the Imperial artillery. This coup was followed up twenty minutes later by the unleashing of the French artillery on the Imperials, who had yet to form up. The effectiveness of this artillery barrage is disputed, and Jacquart concludes it was ineffectual due to the poor conditions. Francis believed the appropriate course was a grand knightly charge to smash into the Imperials. This charge, compromised the French cannons which had to cease firing. According to the contemporary Imperial memoires of a certain Macquériau, Bourbon was almost killed in this charge by his uncle, the vicomte de Thouars. Thouars' efforts were in vain, and Bourbon's men felled the vicomte in this narrative. The modern historian Vissière puts little stock in this story. Though they had the jump on the Imperial cavalry, they were surprised by Spanish arquebusiers under the command of the marquis of Pescara, which cleaved through the French landsknechts and isolated the French cavalry. Bourbon for his part restored order among the Imperial landsknechts of von Frundsberg. A sortie of the garrison of Pavia into the French rear completed the disaster for the French. The battle was over in less than an hour.

In the carnage of the battle of Pavia, the cream of the French command was wiped out: the admiral de Bonnivet (whom Bourbon held murderous intentions against, though the Admiral fell in battle before he could act on it), the maréchal de La Palice, and the vicomte de Thouars dead; the maréchal de Lescun, the comte de Saint-Pol, the king of Navarre and the king of France captured. There was much competition for the capture of Francis among the Imperials, and the French king would in the end surrender to the viceroy of Naples, de Lannoy. Baumgartner reports that the French king had refused to make his surrender to the duc de Bourbon, and had waited until de Lannoy arrived. De Lannoy would have to guard his illustrious prisoner against the desires of his two subordinates, Bourbon and Pescara. According to the contemporary historian Guiccardini, French losses were 8,000 men to the Imperial loss of 700 men. For the Imperial elite, only the marquis of Sant'Angelo had died, while Alarcon, Pescara and de Levya had sustained wounds.

The maréchal de La Palice had originally been made a captive, before a squabble among his captors brought about his death. Bourbon arranged for a funeral to be held for the maréchal. After this funeral the body was transported back to France. Bourbon attempted to convince François de La Trémoille, the new vicomte de Thouars (grandson of the dead Thouars of Pavia) to join his service, but Thouars preferred to pay his ransom.

After a couple of days, Bourbon permitted those captive French prisoners who appeared to lack the means to pay a ransom to return to France. In addition to offering little profit, the resources required to keep them captive was excessive. To ensure the defeated and unarmed soldiers were not troubled by robbers on their return to France, Bourbon had them conducted to the French border by two companies of soldiers. These defeated French soldiers lacked in the way of food for their return journey to the kingdom of France.

Bourbon's role in the battle of Pavia was not the most prominent one. Nevertheless, in his report to emperor Charles V, de Lannoy noted that Bourbon had commended himself in the battle. He also found praise for Pescara, del Vasto, de Leyva and Alarcon. He advised Charles to write congratulatory missives to all these men. In addition to this advice, Lannoy counselled that the Emperor come to Italy so that he might be crowned by the Pope now that he had no more enemies in the peninsula. In the Flemish accounts of the battle, Bourbon was elevated to a role of primacy in the Imperial victory. To him went the credit for the armies organisation and the conduct of the battle. The duc de Bourbon's triumph was a testament to his innocence against the persecution he had been subject to by the French king.

In songs written inside the kingdom of France, Bourbon's situation was also bemoaned. The chancellor Duprat was villainised as the originator of all France's current troubles, and the chief architect of Bourbon being driven from the kingdom.

== League of Cambrai ==
=== Treaty of Madrid ===
With France absent a king and an army, the Holy Roman Emperor Charles V was in a position of great strength. He received feelers from the English king Henry VIII in the form of two ambassadors dispatched on 26 March. Henry proposed to him that they jointly invade the weakened kingdom of France along the lines of their 1521 plan. The English army would land in the north while the Imperial army would cross the two southern frontiers of the French kingdom. These spearheads would link up in Paris, where Henry would be crowned king of France. This joint force would then proceed to Rome so that the Emperor might receive the Imperial crown. If the Emperor did not wish to risk his own life in a further fight, the Imperial-Spanish army could be under the command of the duc de Bourbon. Bourbon was to be rewarded with the return of all his confiscated lands, in addition to those lands he claimed as his own (such as the comté de Provence). The Emperor had those in his council who were less keen on this project, feeling that it gave too much power to the English, who would surely throw themselves against Spain or Flanders in the future. Therefore, instead of this, the Emperor resolved to secure peace with France, by which means the kingdom could be dismembered without the need to fire a shot.

The Emperor wrote to de Lannoy, Bourbon and the count of Rœulx who were to be his representatives with the captive Francis, concerning the extent of his rights on 28 March. He noted that the archduke of Austria had been awarded the crown of France by Pope Boniface VIII, that Dauphiné was an Imperial territory, and Languedoc a claim of the Aragonese. It was a sign of Charles V's generosity that he would renounce these claims and his rights to collect a ransom in favour of more serious negotiations. Despite these 'generosities', the Emperor looked to extract an extensive treaty from the captive Francis. He demanded receipt of the Burgundian inheritance: the duchy of Burgundy, the comté d'Auxerre, the Mâcon, the vicomté d'Auxonne and the seigneurie de Bar-sur-Aube, among other territories France had secured by the treaty of Arras (1435), Conflans (1465) and Péronne (1468). In addition to this, France was to abandon their claims to overlordship over Flanders and Artois; renounce their claims to Milan, Naples, Asti and Genoa; and restore the duc de Bourbon to all his former territories (while also affording him the comté de Provence) which he would hold independently of the French sovereign, making him a new monarch on the European stage. Those who had joined with Bourbon in his betrayal were to be pardoned and restored to their property where they had been subject to despoilment. Bourbon was also to be compensated for his losses since his flight from France, to the sum of 200,000 écus. Further to this, the English king was to be granted those parts of France that rightfully belonged to him (Aquitaine, Guyenne and Normandy) and have his Imperial debts paid off by France. Finally the French king was to marry his son and heir to the Portuguese princess Maria, a niece of the Emperor. If Francis refused these terms, the Emperor was to make war against France, and to this end, Bourbon, who was his lieutenant in Italy, should remain under arms.

Bourbon, de Lannoy and Rœulx travelled to where Francis was being held captive (Pizzighettone) to deliver this Imperial offer in the first days of April 1525. Rœulx delivered the Emperor's offer, while Bourbon and de Lannoy stood by. Francis was stunned by the demands. Though stunned, the French king was not in a position to offer a strong reaction to this extensive proposal. He assented to the elimination of the French claims over Italy, control of the town of Hesdin in Picardy, a marriage between his son and Maria, and the resolution of the lawsuit between Bourbon and Louise in Bourbon's favour. Bourbon would also enjoy the return of his property. The provision of the old constable's offices back to him was a matter in which the captive king was more hesitant. Francis also proposed a marriage between himself and the Habsburg princess Eleanor (the same sister of the Emperor Bourbon had been promised). All the other proposals of the Emperor were rejected by the French king. Despite this rejection, he did offer a compromised proposal as concerned Burgundy. The duchy would be a dowry to his new Habsburg wife, and the (male) children of the marriage would inherit it. If the couple lacked any male children, Burgundy would go to the Emperor's second son. If the Emperor did not have a second son it would go to Francis' second son the duc d'Orléans, who would have to marry a daughter of the Emperor to inherit it. If none of these came to pass the territory would revert to the dauphin.

During his stay in Pizzighettone, the French king formed a bond with his captor de Lannoy. The seigneur de Fleuranges describes a game of bowls played by the King to which the duc de Bourbon, who he had condemned as a traitor, was a party. Francis also played billiards with the duc de Bourbon.

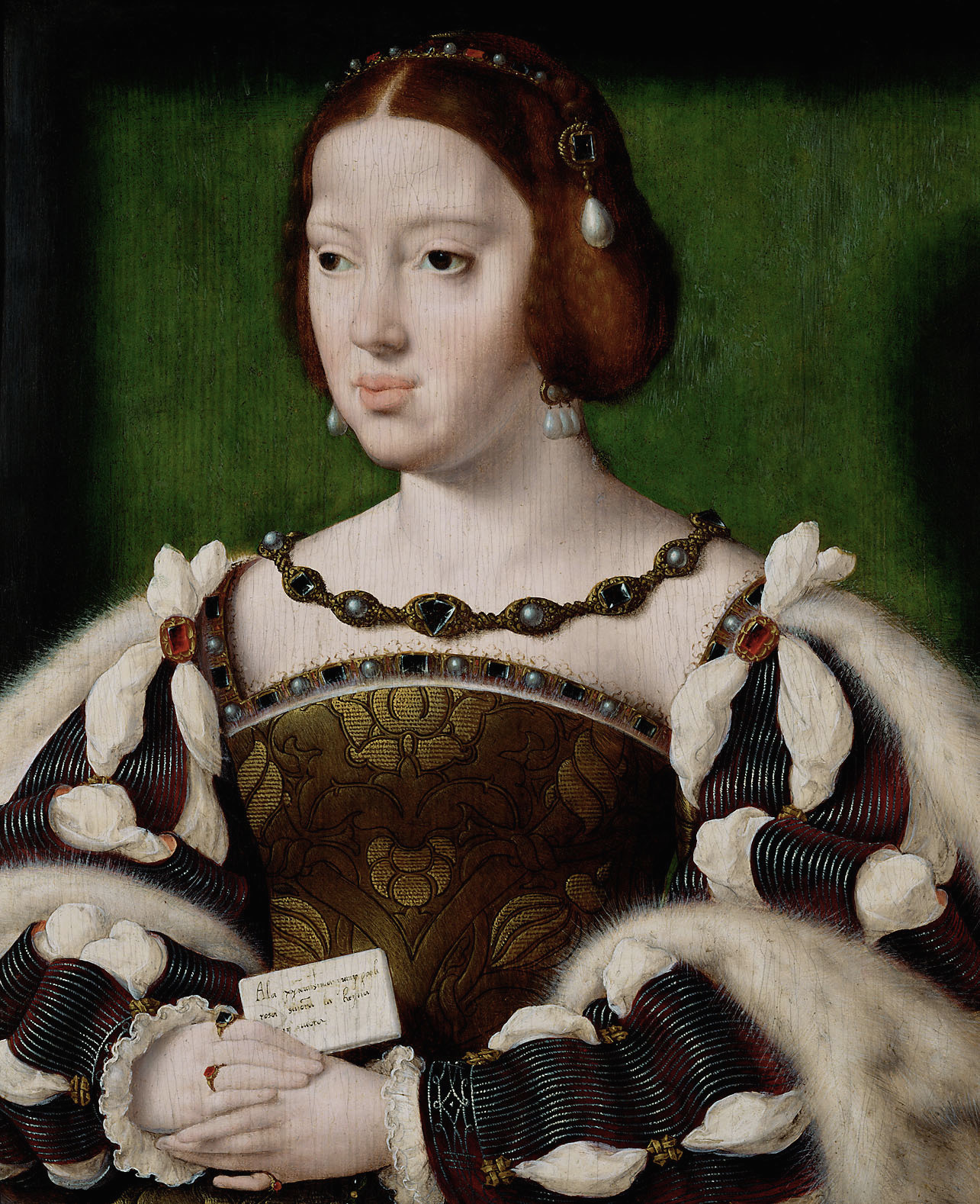
Eleanor of Austria who was promised first to the duc de Bourbon before ultimately being married to the French king Francis I

Keen to maintain the match between himself and the Emperor's sister Eleanor, Bourbon assured Francis that if he was able to marry the Emperor's sister he would return to his state of obedient vassalage towards the French crown.

Concerned for the security of his prisoner, de Lannoy resolved to transfer Francis to Naples in May. Francis succeeded in convincing de Lannoy to instead facilitate a meeting between himself and Charles V. De Lannoy made the decision to accept Francis' proposal alone, not consulting Bourbon or Pescara on the matter, something Bourbon greatly resented him for. Bourbon wrote to Charles V in protest on the subject. De Lannoy was thus confident that the two men would oppose the transfer of Francis to Spain. On 8 June, de Lannoy informs Henry VIII of the transfer of Francis to Spain.

During his stay in Genoa, prior to the transfer, Francis, with the poet Clément Marot by his side, composed a verse account of the military misfortunes the French had suffered over the last few years. This account was to conform to his ideological needs. Bourbon was the author of 'unjust betrayals', and had been ordered by the Emperor to lay siege to Marseille. Yet the siege itself was, according to this narrative, architected by the marquis of Pescara in its entirety. In another later narrative, that of Pierre Galland, the debacle at Pavia was explained away by Francis' need to punish his 'fugitive vassal', a priority that superseded his own safety.

In his conversation with the count of Rœulx, Francis had made it clear he could not personally undertake proper negotiations while he was a prisoner. He therefore devolved negotiations to his mother.

On 6 June 1525, the queen mother Louise wrote a brief that was to form the basis for the French negotiating position in the discussions at Toledo. French claims over Aragon, Naples, Milan, Sardinia and Genoa were spelled out. By this means it was indicated that these were on the table for discussion and could slowly be surrendered as needed, while claims over Burgundy, Picardy and Provence were not. Bourbon had proclaimed himself to occupy the latter of these titles during his invasion of the kingdom in 1524 but Louise considered both this, and his demands to no longer be a subject of Francis for his restored territories, to be unreasonable. There was also no support for his compensation for lost revenues. To support the maintenance of French control over Provence and Dauphiné, in May she commissioned for the historical documents supporting the donation of these territories to France to be dredged up, to provide a tool in her negotiators arsenal. She would consent to the release of some of those who had supported Bourbon in his betrayal and proposed that instead of the sister of Charles V, Eleanor, Bourbon should marry rather Renée the daughter of Louis XII. In addition to Renée she had considered her widowed daughter Marguerite for the duc de Bourbon. By either of these means, Bourbon's loyalty could be won back from the Emperor.

Francis arrived in Spain for his new captivity on 19 June.

Opposed to the prospect of losing 'his bride', in July, Bourbon's agent the seigneur de Saint-Romain worked on Eleanor to try and steer her away from a match with the French king. The attacks were conducted on several axes: Francis would not be pinned down to one woman, he had syphilis, she would have a tyrant for a mother-in-law, and he already head children so Eleanor would never be the mother of the king. By contrast, Bourbon would soon be at the head of an independent fiefdom. The transfer of Francis to Spain unnerved Bourbon as it posed new challenges for the project of frustrating the Francis-Eleanor match.

The French negotiatiating team of de Selve and de Tournon arrived in Toledo on 15 July. In the negotiations that followed, de Selve argued against the legality of the transfer of Burgundy to the Emperor and Provence to Bourbon. The case for the provision of these lands to Bourbon and Charles V was supported by the genealogy, and therefore de Selve's line of attack was based around Salic Law and the impossibility of inheritance through the female line. By this means, he dismissed the rights of Charles V and Bourbon to these lands. The Imperial chancellor Gattinara retorted in relation to Bourbon that it was only recently that Louise had herself claimed to be a closer heir for Suzanne's lands than the constable de Bourbon was. De Selve retorted that Louise's claims against Bourbon did not relate to appanage lands. Gattinara responded to this by illustrating the inheritance of various appanage lands in France through the female line.

In late August, fearful of the collapse of the peace talks, Francis indicated to his jailer his openness to handing over Burgundy on a provisional basis pending more full arbitration. As a result of this a new conference took place on 24 August.

The French proposals were not acceptable to Charles V. Negotiations between the Imperials and the French were going nowhere, and as such the prospect of a new campaign loomed. The Emperor made preparations to lead a war into France. Invasions into Languedoc and Provence were to be undertaken. The duc de Bourbon would be at the head of this army, as Henry VIII had envisioned. However, the Emperor was short of funds, and therefore looked to secure a rich marriage with Isabella of Portugal. The match of the Emperor with Isabelle came as an insulting blow to Henry, whose daughter the Emperor was supposed to marry. Therefore, the scorned English sovereign entered into an alliance with France. By the terms of the treaty of the More on 30 August 1525 he accepted an indemnity of 2,000,000 crowns in return for peace between the kingdoms. By this turnaround, the Emperor's bargaining position was not what it had been. Despite the diplomatic reversal it had cost him, Charles V prepared for his upcoming marriage.

In early October, the King's sister Marguerite, attempted to work on Charles V's sister Eleanor to persuade her against a match with the 'traitor' Bourbon in favour of one with her brother, Francis. When the Emperor discovered this, it was to his fury. One of her ladies-in-waiting, Aymée de La Fayette accompanied Marguerite for these negotiations, and was rewarded for it later by Francis with receipt of the baronie de Laigle, which had been confiscated from the duc de Bourbon.

Francis frustratedly noted the hypocrisy of the Imperial demands made on 9 October that he was expected to disavow his support for the 'rebellious' Albret king of Navarre, the seigneur de Sedan, the duke of Württemberg and the duke of Guelders all the while he would have to not only accept the return of the rebellious Bourbon to the French fold but see him augmented.

In November, the duc de Bourbon travelled to Spain in the hope of convincing Charles V to go through with his marriage to Eleanor. The Emperor had by now changed his mind as regarded the promise he had made to the duc de Bourbon, favouring instead a match for his sister with Francis. For Francis, this match which tied him into the family of his greatest enemy, was advantageous as it denied a considerable prospect to the duc de Bourbon.

Possession of Burgundy continued to represent the impasse between the two parties. Even with England on side, the treaty of the More could not be ratified until Francis himself signed it and therefore France's position remained the more delicate one. As such, on 20 December, Francis agreed to a treaty that was broadly in the mould of the proposals made to him in spring. Francis voided his claims to sovereignty over the counties of Flanders and Artois. Both Bourbon and his accomplices were to be rehabilitated. Most importantly, the duchy of Burgundy would be granted to the Emperor on condition Francis could be released before its granting. Despite this, by a secret declaration, Francis swore off the surrendering of Burgundy. On 20 January 1526, Francis was betrothed by proxy to Charles V's sister Eleanor, who had once been promised to Bourbon, Charles having evaluated the captive king as a better marriage prospect than a landless duc who had betrayed his liege. Francis was permitted to be released before the full implementation of the terms agreed, on condition of the provision of hostages. In February 1526, the King returned to France, with his two eldest sons going into Imperial captivity as a trade. The exchange transpired on the banks of the Bidasoa on 17 March. The treaty of Madrid delivered to Bourbon the goals he had sought in his betrayal of Francis. Bourbon was however to be bitterly disappointed, as the released king quickly ripped up all the terms of the treaty he had assented to in captivity, refusing to provide Burgundy to the Emperor, and getting his refusal validated by an Assembly of Notables and the provincial estates of Burgundy.

=== Change of the guard ===
Six days after the King's return from captivity, the governorship of Languedoc, which the duc de Bourbon had occupied, was granted to the maréchal de Montmorency. Rentet contends that between 19 June 1524 and 23 March 1526 it had been occupied on an interim basis by Francis' eldest son, the dauphin. By contrast, the historian Harding, looking at the letters of provision to Montmorency, dismisses the notion that the King's son ever held the charge on an interim basis, as there is no record of this, and Montmorency's provisions describe the duc de Bourbon as the prior governor. Michon meanwhile indicates that after Bourbon's departure from the kingdom, the vicomte de Lautrec had served as lieutenant-général until 1526. It was to this end that Lautrec made his solemn entry into Toulouse on 4 September 1524. The appointment of Montmorency to the charge in 1526 was hoped by the King to reduce the turbulence caused by Bourbon's defection.

=== Formation of the League of Cognac ===
The Emperor's predominance inspired opposition: England, France and the Italian principalities were united against him. The Italian states had initially offered their congratulations after the battle of Pavia, but this congratulation had quickly transformed into feelings of trouble about the unchallenged dominance of the Imperial party in the peninsula. On 22 May 1526, France entered into a 'league of Cognac', an agreement orchestrated by the Pope and containing Florence, Venice, the Papacy and England. In theory, this alliance was open to the Emperor. However, to join it he would have to restore the Italian states to their pre-1525 state, restore Sforza to Milan and provide a 'reasonable ransom' for Francis' two captive sons. Thus, when he was invited to join the league in September 1526 he instead launched into a diatribe against the character of the French king.

Charles V therefore resolved to fight the league of Cognac with the Imperial army under the command of the duc de Bourbon. Bourbon would face off with the league army which was under the command of the duke of Urbino, a lethargic commander who squandered the leaguer opportunities. The Imperial position in Italy was a tenuous one, and Cloulas contends that with the distractions of Protestantism in the Empire and the Ottomans, had the French committed fully it might have collapsed.

Not receiving the restoration promised to him by the treaty of Madrid, the duc de Bourbon had remained in the service of the Holy Roman Emperor. In December 1525, the marquis of Pescara had died, and the Emperor had established the duc de Bourbon as his new captain general in Italy, even if he was for the moment in Spain. In February 1526, Charles V promised Bourbon investiture with the duchy of Milan if he would only take control of the territory, however this was ambiguous as the legal charges against the Sforza duke of Milan (for his double dealings with the marquis of Pescara in the prior year) had not yet reached their resolution. The Emperor granted the duc 100,000 ducats to pay the soldiers of Italy. Bourbon thereby departed from Barcelona at the end of June 1526 at the head of six ships containing 800 men as well as the money he had been given, arriving in Italy at Genoa. In total Bourbon's relief army in Genoa would number less than ten thousand men. They were up against the leaguer forces which in the north of peninsula numbered twenty two thousand, a significant numerical advantage. From Genoa, Bourbon blitzed towards Milan, taking the league of Cognac off guard, and entering the city itself on 15 July where he established himself as the Imperial lieutenant-general of Italy. So quick was his advance, Sforza scarcely had time to lock himself in the citadel of Milan.

The duke of Urbino captured Lodi on 24 June, after the city was betrayed by a disaffected captain. Francis was however slow to provide support to his new allies (the Papal and Venetian forces in the duchy of Milan). Bourbon's position in Milan was a tenuous one, with the place wracked by hunger and his funds insufficient for the pay of his soldiers. Women, children, and others deemed to be of no value were expelled from Milan to alleviate this trouble. Meanwhile, the leaguer general, Urbino took to the road for Milan on 22 July but would make it no further than the abbey of Casaretto, excusing himself from further advance by the failure of his Swiss allies to go into action at the anticipated moment. On 24 or 25 July 1526 Sforza was forced to abandon the fortress of Milan to the duc de Bourbon, who thereby became master of the city without the need to fire a shot. Sforza left Milan and was taken to Como, though he would join up again with the league. Urbino meanwhile moved off to besiege and capture Cremona, which he accomplished on 23 September.

The Pope fought against the Emperor to the south, though with negotiations conducted in parallel. Pope Clement endeavoured to support coups in both Genoa and Siena but to no avail. In early August 1526, a French envoy arrived in the Papal capital, bringing excuses but nothing material. The Imperial condotierri Colonna was pumping Rome with his soldiers at this time, such that they outnumbered the Papal soldiers. In this circumstance, the Pope resolved to pardon Colonna in return for the Imperial soldiers disarming, and withdrawing. After this, the Pope disarmed, much to the delight of Colonna and Moncada who now prepared to surprise Rome. At the end of September, the Colonna family and Moncada came up to the Vatican from Naples, to punish the Pope, and they partially sacked the city. This was the Emperor's punishment for the Pope's allegiance to the league of Cognac. The chastened pope Clement accepted a truce with the Imperials towards a more general peace in the future. He also agreed to pull his forces out of Milan and the galleys from before Genoa. Colonna then departed from Rome.

Pope Clement would not hold long to his capitulation. He was keen to exercise his revenge on the Colonna and had fourteen of their castles and villages razed. Those who resided in their domains were slaughtered, including women and children.

=== March on Rome ===
French forces finally arrived in the peninsula at the end of September, though only to defend their interests in Genoa and recapture Asti. Francis came in for criticism from his leaguer allies for his failure to commit more troops to the peninsula. For the Imperials around 12,000 landsknechts, under the command of Georg von Frundsberg made their way into the Italian peninsula emerging from the valleys around Verona towards the end of November. It was imperative for the leaguers in the peninsula to stop any juncture between this force and that of the duc de Bourbon. To this end the most talented leaguer captain Giovanni dalle Bande Nere (a cousin of pope Clement) worked to harry the landsknechts without bringing them to battle and this was for a time successful, and they were driven towards Piacenza. Dalle Bande Nere hoped to strike at a moment of weakness, such as when the landsknechts were crossing the Po, and thereby destroy the mercenary force. Unfortunately for the commander, he had failed to appreciate the allegiances of the marquis of Mantua who helped the landsknechts speed their journey. On 25 November, dalle Bande Nere caught up with the landsknecht rearguard as it crossed the Po near Governolo, but died of wounds sustained in the engagement. With dalle Bande Nerra dead, the duke of Urbino withdrew from offensive action, freeing up Bourbon's hands considerably and catapulting his position from one of disadvantage to one of dominance. The landsknechts tarried for a month around Piacenza during the bitter winter, while they awaited Bourbon. Bourbon departed Lombardy in January 1527, linking up with von Frundsberg's landsknechts around Fidenza on the south bank of the Po. Their combined army now numbered around 20,000. Between ten and twelve thousand of the landsknechts under von Frundsberg's command were Protestants keen to destroy the Pope's power, another 4 and 5,000 of Bourbon's army were Spanish tercios who had arrived in the peninsula via Genoa, and around 2,000 were Italians. The Imperial cavalry was under the command of the young prince d'Orange. Among the irregular Italians in his army were men of some note including Marc'Antonio Colonna and Ferrante Gonzaga. The duc de Bourbon was by this point feeling that he was kept at a distance by the other Imperial captains. They had respect for Bourbon's social status and enthusiasm, but they did not rate him as a commander. Bourbon and von Frundsberg set forward on 22 February 1527, with an unknown goal in central Italy in mind. The combined armies passage across the river Panaro (a tributary of the Po) was facilitated by a boat bridge produced by the duke of Ferrara with whom the duc was on excellent terms. The Panaro crossed, Bourbon conquered the Papal territory of Bologna, putting the place to the sword and then made to move south towards Rome. During March, the financial problems in the Imperial army reached such a severity that Bourbon's pavilion was ransacked by his soldiers, his fellow commander von Frundsberg had an apoplectic fit dealing with the mutinous nature of the soldiers and left the army for Ferrara so that he might recover. For the Pope, a pincer now loomed as Bourbon approached from the north, and his southern flank was menaced by de Lannoy who looked to support Bourbon's invasion from the kingdom of Naples.

Lannoy had invaded Papal territory from the south and put the place of Frosinone to siege. Frosinone held a strategic position controlling the road towards Rome. On 2 February, his assault on Frosinone was rebuffed, and the pendulum swung against de Lannoy. The Papal army, under the command of da Ceri who had previously faced off against Bourbon in the siege of Marseille several years prior, now invaded the kingdom of Naples. The Pope's successes against Lannoy buoyed his morale. By now Bourbon was approaching Florence, and therefore pope Clement looked to secure his southern flank. Over the objections of the Papal commander da Ceri, an extension of the earlier September 1526 truce was agreed with de Lannoy for eight months on 15 March. By its terms, the Pope would pay off the landsknechts of Bourbon's subordinate von Frundsberg with 60,000 écus in return for Imperial armies vacating the Papal states. With this done, the Pope disbanded the Papal army, confident his adversaries would advance no further, receiving recall orders from the Emperor. The Emperor for his part, anticipated a quick peace would be forthcoming with the Papacy. Simultaneously though, he hoped to make an example out of the Pope for his recent assault on de Lannoy.

Charles allowed the two contradictory policies of de Lannoy and Bourbon as regarded Italy to coexist with one another, permitting time to determine which of the two would be followed. Indeed, he would write to Bourbon when the latter was before Rome to ensure that the Pope agreed to a 'good peace'.

Uninterested in abiding by the truce that Clement had reached with de Lannoy, the duc de Bourbon's mutinous army continued its invasion of the Papal states. With the army defying an Imperial truce, the marquis del Vasto retired from the army. As Bourbon marched, he was shadowed by the league of Cognac army, which kept its distance. The duke of Urbino was under the misapprehension that Bourbon's target was Florence, and he failed to guard against a march into Lazio. As Bourbon's army made its way through Tuscany through February and March, they passed Florence and Arezzo in turn. The enemies of the Medici in Florence, took the opportunity to rise up, with an assault being led against the palazzo di Signoria. On 26 April, the duke of Urbino and the marquis of Saluzzo entered Florence, quelling the flames of the rebellion and bringing it into the League. With Urbino and Saluzzo in the city Bourbon decided against any enterprise against it and set his eyes on Rome. The uprising in Florence caused alarm for the duke of Urbino, who hurried to the city to ensure its loyalty to the anti-Imperial cause. After the sack of Rome in May, the Medici would see themselves exiled from the Florentine Republic. After Arezzo, Bourbon's army was able to enter the friendly territory of Siena, moving at a quick pace as they followed the via Cassia southwards. As the army got further and further south, its size bloomed with defectors from the leaguer army until eventually it was around 30,000 strong. From the end of April, the army began to trace the route of the Tiber towards Rome. Le Roux imagines that Bourbon was motivated by a need to capture the Pope, so that he might extract pay for his soldiers. Indeed, Chastel feels the only thing holding the landsknechts and Spanish soldiers to the army was the prospect of getting to sack Rome. Rivero Rodríguez suggests Bourbon was motivated by a desire to maintain his hold over Milan that the Emperor had granted him, and the mutinous nature of his soldiery was a pretext for ignoring the truce. Le Fur argues that the sum de Lannoy had secured from the pope for the mercenaries was felt to be insufficient, and that Bourbon was seeking the 150,000 more ducats for his troops.

For his part, Pope Clement himself abandoned the truce he had established on 25 April, when he was convinced by the French ambassador in Rome to become party to a new iteration of the league. It was too late now to find safety in the league, and before the French representatives could bring word of this new accord to their master, Bourbon had put the eternal city to siege.

=== Sack of Rome ===
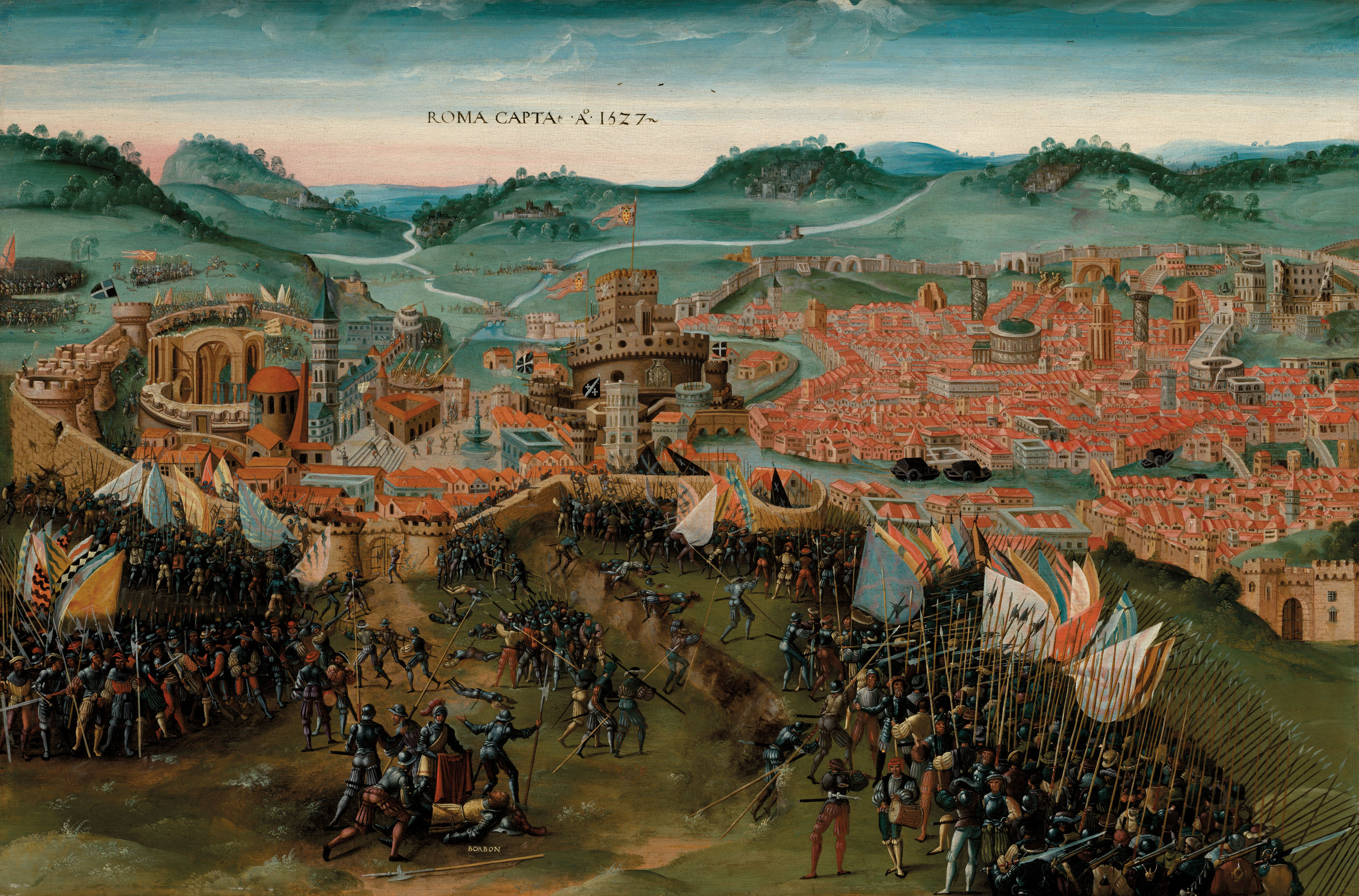
Sack of Rome, towards the front of the image, the convalescing duc de Bourbon can be seen

Bourbon's army arrived before the city of Rome on 5 May and was immediately set upon by the cannons of the defenders. Assaults of the city began early in the morning on 6 May 1527, taking advantage of a morning fog which interfered with the ability of the defenders of the Castel Sant'Angelo to use their cannons. Attacks were launched against the Borgo and Trastevere. This attack on Rome was a gamble for Bourbon, as his army had no artillery to speak of. The defence was led by the Papal commander da Ceri, but he had only 3,000 men at his disposal. The landsknechts worked to scale the bastion of Santo Spirito, while the Spanish soldiers worked on the porta Torrione. During the second assault of the walls near the porta Torrione, Bourbon was fatally shot. He had been climbing the walls, dressed in white, when he was hit by an arquebus bullet supposedly fired by the Florentine sculptor Benvenuto Cellini. Despite the loss of their commander, by the end of the day, Rome was open to the Imperial army, which had lost a thousand men in the days fighting. The city was subject to a terrible eight day sack, with thousands murdered, many raped, and the city pillaged and burned by the army angry at their lack of pay. Cloulas estimates the value of the loot at 1,000,000 ducats. The Pope and fourteen cardinals who were in the city narrowly escaped capture or death and fled into the Castel Sant'Angelo. Bourbon was succeeded as head of the Imperial army by the prince d'Orange. The prince was popular with the landsknechts but the other Imperial commanders considered him too youthful and inexperienced. Orange was only able to redirect the fury of the soldiers from an assault on Sant'Angelo with difficulty. On 6 June, Clement capitulated, agreeing to pay a ransom for his freedom. Nevertheless, Clement would remain a prisoner in Sant'Angelo until November.

The shock of the sack of Rome reverberated through the Christian world. The particularly brutal nature of the capture of the city by Bourbon's army was picked up on by the enemies of the Habsburgs. Bourbon himself, responsible for the city's capture, had been 'punished for it by divine providence'. In his rhetorical battles with Charles V in the 1540s, Francis I used the sack of a Rome as a verbal cudgel to dismantle the Emperor's profession of his pro-papal credentials.

Bourbon's body was placed under a red velvet sheet, with his sword resting on top of him. It first resided in the Sistine Chapel where he was embalmed and installed in a coffin. On 30 June, Charles V requested of the prince d'Orange to either have Bourbon buried in a grand tomb in Milan or in Naples. The prince d'Orange then saw to the removal of his body back south to Neapolitan territory, where he would be buried in the chapel of the castle of Gaeta. Charles V would himself attend the funeral service of his former lieutenant. He would remain in the chapel until 1562, when he was posthumously excommunicated and his body dug up and placed outside the chapel, where it remained for the following centuries. The castle of Gaeta was destroyed in 1860.

=== Vacant offices ===
Bourbon's authority in Italy was transferred to the viceroy of Naples, de Lannoy, thereby uniting Imperial command in the peninsula under one man.

The office of constable, which Bourbon had ceased to occupy by his defection to the Imperial camp, would remain vacant until 10 February 1538, when it was bestowed on Montmorency, who had succeeded to Bourbon's governorship of Languedoc back in 1526. In a symbolic and deliberately ironic step, the ceremony of conferment in which the King signed the letters of provision in the presence of many ducs and cardinals, took place in the capital of the old Bourbon domain at Moulins.

Bourbon's death left the ducal title of Milan vacant. The matter of Milan would be a priority for the Spanish courtiers of the Emperor, more so than what had transpired in Rome. The archduke don Fernando claimed the duchy for himself. Meanwhile, the Emperor's chancellor Gattinara counselled the territory be given to Charles' eldest son Philip.

=== Legacy ===
For the royal disgrace and execution of the financier Semblançay in 1527 rumour was spread that associated him with the duc de Bourbon.

By the terms of the treaty of Cambrai in 1529, the Emperor attained from Francis a rehabilitation of Bourbon's memory, which was pronounced in May 1530. By its terms, the late duc’s inheritance was to be granted to his elder sister Louise, princesse de La Roche-sur-Yon and her son Louis. Nevertheless, by the 1540s, Francis would decry how the Emperor had corrupted Bourbon in service of seeking imperial supremacy.

Bourbon's non-appanage lands, were with the main exception of Auvergne taken over by the queen mother Louise in August 1527. She also received parts of the principality of Dombes, as well as the Beaujolais and Forez. Other parts of the Bourbon inheritance went to the King's third son the duc d'Angoulême to supplement his appanage. The duc d'Albany received much of Bourbon's furniture. Those lands granted to Louise were reunited with the French crown in 1531 upon her death. The merging of these lands with the crown was declared in royal council in 1532. Francis would continue to allocate lands of the Bourbon inheritance to those whose service he appreciated in the coming years. For example, further lands came to his mother in the form of the Villeneuve in the principality of the Dombes in September 1527 and the Gironde in the duché de Châtellerault. The comte de Monopollo would receive several lands derived from Bourbon through Francis in March 1528 when he took possession of seigneurie de Montmerle and de Thoissey in the Dombes. Of the around forty seigneuries that had once belonged to the duc de Bourbon that were put on the market in the 1530s, almost all of them (thirty seven) were purchased by non-nobles. The Bourbon inheritance was disputed by the late Bourbon's sister the princesse de La Roche-sur-Yon and the duc de Vendôme who felt entitled to some of the territories. In the following decades the second house of Bourbon-Montpensier (which was a cadet branch of the house of Bourbon-Vendôme) would see the comté de Montpensier, the Forez and dauphiné d'Auvergne returned to them in 1538 in return for renouncing their rights to the rest of Bourbon's lands. By this means, it would be Bourbon's maternal nephew Louis de Bourbon who would become the first duc de Montpensier. The Bourbon inheritance question was only entirely resolved in the reign of Charles IX.

The treatment of Bourbon by Francis would arouse some disapproval in sections of the nobility. These nobles saw him as a casualty of Francis' actions. Nevertheless, Bourbon's destruction did not represent a subjugation of the nobility. Nobles continues to enjoy a central place in the halls of royal power. Rather, the supremacy of royal arbitration was illustrated, but even this was not a permanent demonstration, and relied on the strength of the crown. From Bourbon's death in 1527 to the advent of the French Wars of Religion, the French king would enjoy absolute fidelity in his kingdom. Quilliet argues that Bourbon's defiance was only a brief blip in a period in which the ability of the king to conduct hostilities was an exclusive monopoly.

Bourbon was celebrated in the verse of a popular Flemish song, which had traction inside France.

Jouanna discusses the personal character of the duc de Bourbon. She describes him as being prideful, imperious and with a keen sense of his own importance. This complicated his relationship with king Francis.

In Nawrocki's biography of the admiral d'Annebault, the historian discusses the lack of durability in that figures historical reputation. He compares Annebault to Bourbon among other figures, noting that through his betrayal, the Constable 'marked history forever'.

== Notes ==
^α Quilliet erroneously describes the year as being 1524, but Alençon died in April 1525.

== Sources ==
- Alazard, Florence (2018). "François Ier et Venise: De la «Faustissima Nova» (1515) À «Un Tradimento Expresso» (1542)". In Amico, Juan Carlos d'; Fournel, Jean-Louis (eds.). François Ier et l'Espace Politique Italien: États, Domaines et Territoires.
- Amico, Juan Carlos d' (2018). "François Ier et les Révoltes Siciliennes". In Amico, Juan Carlos d'; Fournel, Jean-Louis (eds.). François Ier et l'Espace Politique Italien: États, Domaines et Territoires.
- Baumgartner, Frederic (1994). Louis XII. Alan Sutton Publishing Limited.
- Baumgartner, Frederic (1988). Henry II: King of France 1547–1559. Duke University Press.
- Baumgartner, Frederic (1995). France in the Sixteenth Century. St Martin's Press.
- Carroll, Stuart (2011). Martyrs and Murderers: The Guise Family and the Making of Europe. Oxford University Press.
- Carouge, Pierre (1999). L'Amiral de Bonnivet et Sa Famille (vers 1450 – vers 1525). École Nationale des Chartes.
- Carouge, Pierre (2011). "Artus (1474 – 1519) et Guillaume (1482 – 1525) Gouffier à l'émergence de nouvelles modalités de gouvernement". In Michon, Cédric (ed.). Les Conseillers de François Ier. Presses Universitaires de Rennes.
- Chastel, André (1984). Le Sac de Rome, 1527. Gallimard.
- Chevalier, Bernard (2005). Guillaume Briçonnet (v. 1445 – 1514): Un Cardinal-Ministre au Début de La Renaissance. Presses Universitaires de Rennes.
- Chevalier, Bernard (2011). "Florimond Robertet (v. 1465-1527)". In Michon, Cédric (ed.). Les Conseillers de François Ier. Presses Universitaires de Rennes.
- Cloulas, Ivan (1979). Catherine de Médicis. Fayard.
- Cloulas, Ivan (1985). Henri II. Fayard.
- Crouzet, Denis (2003). Charles de Bourbon: Connétable de France. Fayard.
- David-Chapy, Aubrée (2022). Anne de France: Gouverner au Féminin à la Renaissance. Passés Composés.
- David-Chapy, Aubrée (2023). Louise de Savoie: Régente et Mère du Roi. Passés Composés.
- Duc, Séverin (2019). La Guerre de Milan: Conquérir, Gouverner, Résister dans l'Europe de la Renaissance. Champ Vallon.
- Duc, Séverin; Rizzo, Mario (2018). "Les Habsbourg, Les Valois et L'Enjeu de la Guerre: Stratégies en Comparaison dans le Milanais au Cours de la Première Moitié du XVIe Siècle". In Amico, Juan Carlos d'; Fournel, Jean-Louis (eds.). François Ier et l'Espace Politique Italien: États, Domaines et Territoires.
- Dupont-Pierrart, Nicole (2017). Claire de Gonzague Comtesse de Bourbon-Montpensier (1464-1503): Une Princesse Italienne à la Cour de France. Presses Universitaires du Septentrion.
- Durot, Éric (2012). François de Lorraine, Duc de Guise entre Dieu et le Roi. Classiques Garnier.
- Foletier, François de Vaux de (1925). Galiot de Genouillac: Maître de L'Artillerie de France (1465 – 1546). Auguste Picard.
- Guinand, Julien (2020). La Guerre du Roi aux Portes de l'Italie: 1515-1559. Presses Universitaires de Rennes.
- Hamon, Philippe (1999). "Messieurs des Finances": Les Grands Officiers de Finance dans la France de la Renaissance. Comité pour l'Histoire Économique et Financière de la France.
- Hamon, Philippe (2011a). "Charles de Bourbon, connétable de France (1490-1527)". In Michon, Cédric (ed.). Les Conseillers de François Ier. Presses Universitaires de Rennes.
- Hamon, Philippe (2011b). "Semblançay, homme de finances et de Conseil (v. 1455–1527)". In Michon, Cédric (ed.). Les Conseillers de François Ier. Presses Universitaires de Rennes.
- Hamon, Philippe (2011c). "Gilbert Bayard (? – 1548)". In Michon, Cédric (ed.). Les Conseillers de François Ier. Presses Universitaires de Rennes.
- Hamon, Philippe (2021a). 1453-1559: Les Renaissances. Gallimard.
- Hamon, Philippe (2021b). "BOURBON, Charles de, connétable (?, 17 février 1490 - Rome, 6 mai 1527)". In Jouanna, Arlette; Hamon, Philippe; Biloghi, Dominique; Le Thiec, Guy (eds.). La France de La Renaissance: Histoire et Dictionnaire. Bouquins.
- Hamon, Philippe (2021c). "MONTPENSIER, Gilbert de (vers 1443 ? - Pouzzoles, 9 novembre 1496)". In Jouanna, Arlette; Hamon, Philippe; Biloghi, Dominique; Le Thiec, Guy (eds.). La France de La Renaissance: Histoire et Dictionnaire. Bouquins.
- Harding, Robert (1978). Anatomy of a Power Elite: the Provincial Governors in Early Modern France. Yale University Press.
- Houllemare, Marie (2011). "Guillaume Poyet (v. 1473 – 1548)". In Michon, Cédric (ed.). Les Conseillers de François Ier. Presses Universitaires de Rennes.
- Jacquart, Jean (1994). François Ier. Fayard.
- Jouanna, Arlette (2009). La France de La Renaissance. Perrin.
- Jouanna, Arlette (2021a). La France du XVIe Siècle 1483-1598. Presses Universitaires de France.
- Jouanna, Arlette (2021b). "Le Temps de la Renaissance en France (vers 1470-1559)". In Jouanna, Arlette; Hamon, Philippe; Biloghi, Dominique; Le Thiec, Guy (eds.). La France de La Renaissance: Histoire et Dictionnaire. Bouquins.
- Kalas, Robert (2011). "Jean de Selve (1475-1529)". In Michon, Cédric (ed.). Les Conseillers de François Ier. Presses Universitaires de Rennes.
- Knecht, Robert (1994). Renaissance Warrior and Patron: The Reign of Francis I. Cambridge University Press.
- Knecht, Robert (1996). The Rise and Fall of Renaissance France. Fontana Press.
- Knecht, Robert (2008). The French Renaissance Court. Yale University Press.
- Knecht, Robert (2011a). "Jacques de Genouillac, dit Galiot (v. 1465 – 1546)". In Michon, Cédric (ed.). Les Conseillers de François Ier. Presses Universitaires de Rennes.
- Knecht, Robert (2011b). "Jacques II de Chabannes, seigneur de La Palisse ou La Palice (v. 1470-1525)". In Michon, Cédric (ed.). Les Conseillers de François Ier. Presses Universitaires de Rennes.
- Knecht, Robert (2011c). "Louise de Savoie (1476-1531)". In Michon, Cédric (ed.). Les Conseillers de François Ier. Presses Universitaires de Rennes.
- Knecht, Robert (2011d). "Éléonore d'Autriche (1498 – 1558)". In Michon, Cédric (ed.). Les Conseillers de François Ier. Presses Universitaires de Rennes.
- Knecht, Robert (2011e). "Philippe Chabot de Brion (v. 1492 – 1543)". In Michon, Cédric (ed.). Les Conseillers de François Ier. Presses Universitaires de Rennes.
- Le Fur, Didier (2009). Henri II. Tallandier.
- Le Fur, Didier (2018). François Ier. Perrin.
- Le Gall, Jean-Marie (2015). L'Honneur Perdu de François Ier. Payot.
- Le Roux, Nicolas (2000). La Faveur du Roi: Mignons et Courtisans au Temps des Derniers Valois (vers 1547 – vers 1589. Champ Vallon.
- Le Roux, Nicolas (2013). Le Roi, La Cour, L'État de La Renaissance À L'Absolutisme. Champ Vallon.
- Le Roux, Nicolas (2015). Le Crépuscule de la Chevalerie: Noblesse et Guerre au Siècle de la Renaissance. Champ Vallon.
- Le Roux, Nicolas (2015b). 1515: L'Invention de La Renaissance. Armand Colin.
- Meschini, Stefano (2018). "Il Governo del Ducato di Milano Negli Anni di Luigi XII e di Francesco I: Continuità e Differenze". In Amico, Juan Carlos d'; Fournel, Jean-Louis (eds.). François Ier et l'Espace Politique Italien: États, Domaines et Territoires.
- Michon, Cédric (2011a). "Conseils et Conseillers sous François Ier". In Michon, Cédric (ed.). Les Conseillers de François Ier. Presses Universitaires de Rennes.
- Michon, Cédric (2011b). "Introduction: Le Conseil de François Ier (1515-1531)". In Michon, Cédric (ed.). Les Conseillers de François Ier. Presses Universitaires de Rennes.
- Michon, Cédric (2011c). "Charles, duc d'Alençon (1489-1525)". In Michon, Cédric (ed.). Les Conseillers de François Ier. Presses Universitaires de Rennes.
- Michon, Cédric (2011d). "René, Grand Bâtard de Savoie (v. 1473 – 1525)". In Michon, Cédric (ed.). Les Conseillers de François Ier. Presses Universitaires de Rennes.
- Michon, Cédric (2011e). "Odet de Foix, vicomte de Lautrec (v. 1483-1528)". In Michon, Cédric (ed.). Les Conseillers de François Ier. Presses Universitaires de Rennes.
- Michon, Cédric (2018). François Ier: Un Roi Entre Deux Mondes. Belin.
- Nawrocki, François (2015). L'Amiral Claude d'Annebault: conseiller favori de François Ier. Classiques Garnier.
- Pacini, Arturo (2018). "Francesco I e Genova: Quale Strategia? La Francia alla Ricerca del «Vray Secret des Affaires d'Italie»". In Amico, Juan Carlos d'; Fournel, Jean-Louis (eds.). François Ier et l'Espace Politique Italien: États, Domaines et Territoires.
- Pellegrini, Marco (2017). Le Guerre d'Italia 1494-1559. Società Editrice il Mulino.
- Potter, David (1993). War and Government in the French Provinces: Picardy 1470-1560. Cambridge University Press.
- Potter, David (1995). A History of France 1460-1560: The Emergence of a Nation State. Macmillan.
- Potter, David (2011). "Anne de Pisseleu (1508-1580), duchesse d'Étampes, maîtresse et conseillère de François Ier". In Michon, Cédric (ed.). Les Conseillers de François Ier. Presses Universitaires de Rennes.
- Quilliet, Bernard (1986). Louis XII: Père du Peuple. Fayard.
- Quilliet, Bernard (1998). La France du Beau XVIe Siècle. Fayard.
- Reid, Jonathan (2011a). "Marguerite de Navarre, la sœur fidèle (1492–1549)". In Michon, Cédric (ed.). Les Conseillers de François Ier. Presses Universitaires de Rennes.
- Reid, Jonathan (2011b). "Henri d'Albret, roi de Navarre (1502–1555)". In Michon, Cédric (ed.). Les Conseillers de François Ier. Presses Universitaires de Rennes.
- Rentet, Thierry (2011a). Anne de Montmorency: Grand Maître de François Ier. Presses Universitaires de Rennes.
- Rentet, Thierry (2011b). "Jean Brinon (1484-1528)". In Michon, Cédric (ed.). Les Conseillers de François Ier. Presses Universitaires de Rennes.
- Rentet, Thierry (2011c). "Anne de Montmorency (1493-1567): Le Conseiller Médiocre". In Michon, Cédric (ed.). Les Conseillers de François Ier. Presses Universitaires de Rennes.
- Rentet, Thierry; Michon, Cédric (2011). "Annexe I: Présences annuelles au Conseil (1515-1547)". In Michon, Cédric (ed.). Les Conseillers de François Ier. Presses Universitaires de Rennes.
- Rivero-Rodríguez, Manuel (2018). Amico, Juan Carlos d'; Fournel, Jean-Louis (eds.). La Política Anti Francesa del Gran Canciller Gattinara: Dos Monarquías Incompatibles.
- Sainte-Marie, Anselme de (1733). Histoire généalogique et chronologique de la maison royale de France, des pairs, grands officiers de la Couronne, de la Maison du Roy et des anciens barons du royaume: Tome I. La compagnie des libraires.
- Rodríguez Salgado, Maria José (2018). "A Masterclass in Justification: Francis I, Charles V and Pope Paul III in the 1540s". In Amico, Juan Carlos d'; Fournel, Jean-Louis (eds.). François Ier et l'Espace Politique Italien: États, Domaines et Territoires.
- Roelker, Nancy (1968). Queen of Navarre: Jeanne d'Albret 1528-1572. Harvard University Press.
- Salmon, J.H.M. (1979). Society in Crisis: France in the Sixteenth Century. Metheun & Co.
- Shaw, Christine (2018). Amico, Juan Carlos d'; Fournel, Jean-Louis (eds.). Francis I, Charles V and the Roman Barons.
- Shaw, Christine; Mallett, Michael (2019). The Italian Wars 1494-1559: War, State and Society in Early Modern Europe. Routledge.
- Sournia, Jean-Charles (1981). Blaise de Monluc: Soldat et Écrivain (1500-1577). Fayard.
- Tievant, Claude (1993). Le Gouverneur de Languedoc Pendant Les Premières Gueurres de Religion (1559 – 1574): Henry de Montmorency-Damville. Publisud.
- Vellet, Christophe (2011). "Entre Légistes et Ministres: Antoine Duprat (1463-1535), Conseiller Technicien de François Ier". In Michon, Cédric (ed.). Les Conseillers de François Ier. Presses Universitaires de Rennes.
- Vissière, Laurent (2000). Louis II de La Trémoille ou la Découverte de L'Italie (1480-1525). École Nationale des Chartes.
- Vissière, Laurent (2008). Sans Poinct Sortir horse de l'Orniere: Louis II de La Trémoille (1460-1525). Honoré Champion.
- Vissière, Laurent (2011). "Louis II de La Trémoille (1460-1525): Au Service de François Ier". In Michon, Cédric (ed.). Les Conseillers de François Ier. Presses Universitaires de Rennes.
- Wanegffelen, Thierry (2005). Catherine de Médicis: Le Pouvoir au Féminin. Biographie Payot.

Preceded by Louis II	Count of Clermont and Montpensier; Dauphin of Auvergne; 1501–1527	Succeeded by Louise
Preceded by François	Duke of Châtellerault; 1515–1527	Succeeded by Louise
Preceded by Suzanne	Duke of Auvergne and Bourbon; Count of Clermont-en-Beauvaisis, Forez, Gien and La Marche; 1521–1527	Succeeded by Louise
