= François, Duke of Châtellerault =

French prince and soldier (1492–1515)

François de Bourbon
- Duc de Châtellerault
- Born: 1492
- Died: 13 September 1515 (aged 22–23); Marignano, Duchy of Milan
- House: Bourbon-Montpensier
- Father: Gilbert de Bourbon, comte de Montpensier
- Mother: Clara Gonzaga

François de Bourbon, duc de Châtellerault (1492 – 13 September 1515) was a French prince du sang and soldier during the Italian Wars. The son of Gilbert de Bourbon, comte de Montpensier (count of Montpensier) and Clara Gonzaga, Châtellerault had two elder brothers, one of whom was the famous duc de Bourbon (duke of Bourbon).

At the advent of the reign of the French king François I, or Francis I, Châtellerault played a ceremonial role in the new king's coronation, standing in for the duc de Guyenne. François made Châtellerault into a duc, where previously he had been a vicomte (viscount). The duc de Châtellerault participated in the French 1515 campaign into Italy to reconquer territories for France as part of the vanguard of the army. This campaign culminated at the victorious battle of Marignano at which Châtellerault was killed. His titles went to his elder brother the duc de Bourbon.

== Early life and family ==
François de Bourbon was born in 1492, the son of Gilbert de Bourbon, comte de Montpensier (count of Montpensier) and Clara Gonzaga. His parents, Clara and Gilbert had married in 1481. Gilbert de Bourbon fought in the Italian Wars of Charles VIII, and briefly served as the king's viceroy and grand justicier in newly conquered Naples. He died in 1496. Clara Gonzaga was the daughter of the marquis of Mantua.

Around the end of the fifteenth century there existed three branches of the house of Bourbon. The Bourbon's proper (with the duché de Bourbon (duchy of Bourbon) and duché d'Auvergne capital among their holdings but also the vicomté de Châtellerault - viscounty of Châtellerault), and the two cadet branches: the Bourbon-Vendôme (holding the comté de Vendôme - county of Vendôme - chief among its possessions) and the Bourbon-Montpensier of which François was a member (holding the comté de Montpensier). A couple of decades later, the Bourbon's proper had been subsumed by the Bourbon-Montpensier through the marriage of François' elder brother Charles to the Bourbon heiress Suzanne, this concentrated a considerable estate largely in the hands of the comte de Montpensier.

François was the younger brother of Louis de Bourbon, comte de Montpensier (who died in 1501) and Charles de Bourbon, comte de Montpensier, the latter of whom would become the duc de Bourbon through marriage to Suzanne de Bourbon, as well as holding the governate of Languedoc and other offices.

=== New reign ===
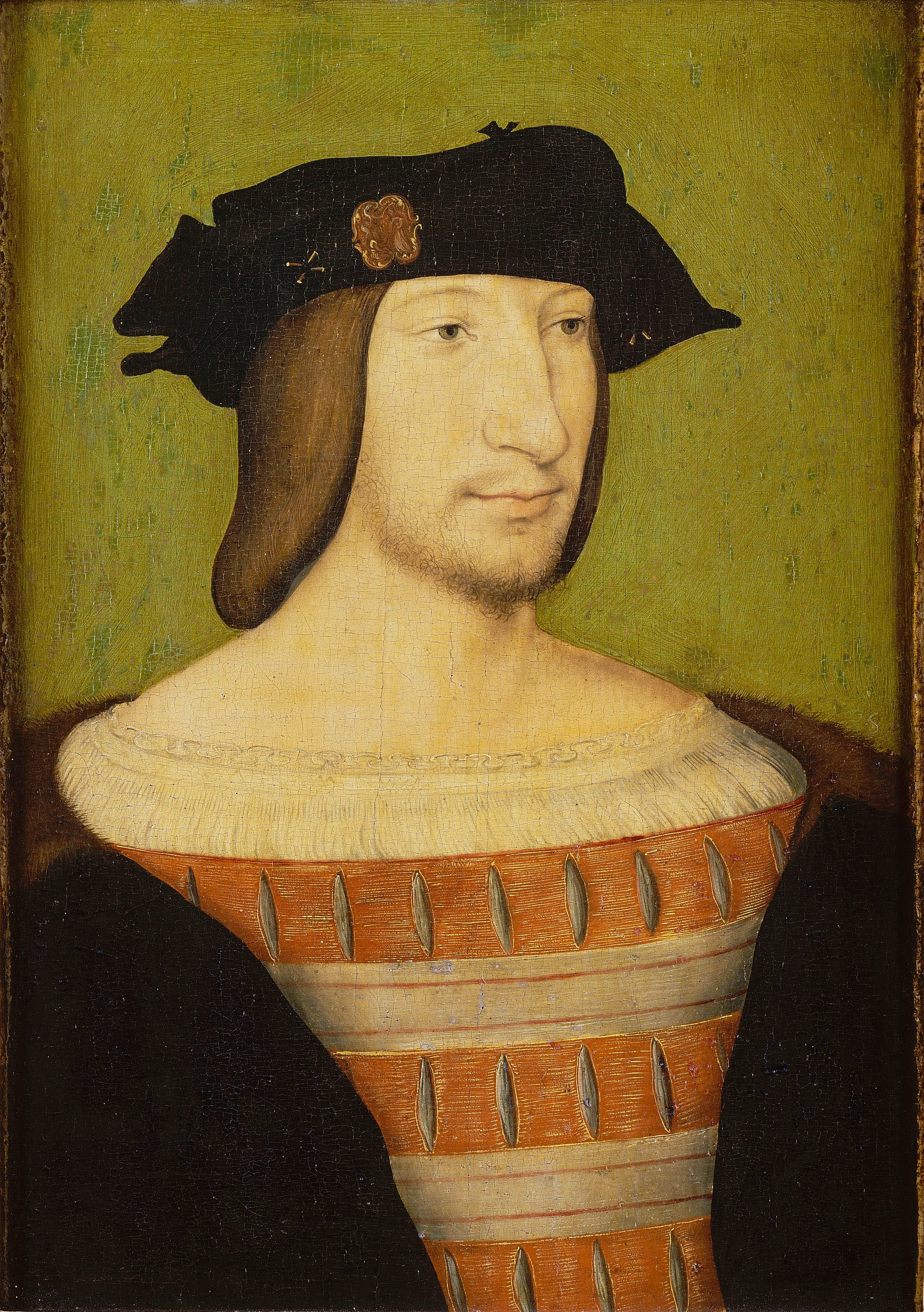
King François I of France around the time of his coronation

Early on 1 January 1515, Louis XII died. He was succeeded by his cousin and heir, the comte d'Angoulême who took the regnal name François I (alternatively rendered Francis I).

Six days after the burial of Louis XII, king François made for Reims, so that he might be crowned and anointed in the holy oil. His journey to Reims was as part of a grand procession featuring many of the leading nobles of the kingdom, including for the princes du sang the duc d'Alençon, Châtellerault's brother the duc de Bourbon, the comte de Vendôme and the comte de Saint-Pol alongside various other great nobles of the kingdom.

On the evening of 24 January, the procession arrived before Reims. The party made a Joyous Entry (a special first entry of a sovereign into a town) into the city, bearing witness to various street shows as they made their way towards the cathedral of Reims where they were greeted by the archbishop of Reims, and many of the other bishops of the kingdom. After some prayers and readings, François, preceded by the princes du sang, gave thanks at the altar to the Virgin Mary and god for the gifts they had given him.

Around midnight, king François took his matins early, alongside only the close princes du sang. This timetable was accelerated to prepare things for the coming day. In the morning, François was escorted to the cathedral again, where he was seated alongside the twelve pairs (peers) of the realm. These were divided into two groups of six, the pairs ecclésiastiques (ecclesiastical peers) and the pairs laïcs (lay peers). Each of these six were in turn divided into two groups, the comital and ducal. For the ducal ecclesiastical pairs, the archbishop of Reims, the bishop of Laon, and the bishop of Langres; for the comital ecclesiastical pairs, the bishop of Châlons, the bishop of Noyon and the bishop of Beauvais. The situation was a little different with the secular pairs as most of the titles in question had been absorbed into the royal domain, therefore substitutes were chosen to represent the pairs for the occasion. For the ducal pairs there were: the duc de Burgundy (represented by the duc d'Alençon), the duc de Normandy (represented by the duc de Lorraine) and the duc de Guyenne (represented by the vicomte de Châtellerault). Then there were the comital pairs: the comte de Champagne (represented by the comte de Saint-Pol), the comte de Toulouse (represented by the prince de La Roche-sur-Yon) and the comte de Flanders and Luxembourg (still an independent seigneur, but the figure in question was the lord of the Netherlands who gave his apologies for his absence, and was therefore represented by the comte de Vendôme for the ceremonies).

This group of pairs and the king awaited the arrival of the abbot of Saint-Remi, who brought the Holy Ampulla (the vial containing the anointing oil). The abbot of Saint-Denis meanwhile had brought the royal regalia. With their arrival, the ceremonies began. There followed singing, prayers, an oath of coronation, a ritual of knighthood in which Châtellerault's brother the duc de Bourbon knighted the king, the anointing with the oil, and the crowning of the king. Anointed and crowned, François mounted a platform and was acclaimed by the archbishop of Reims. The pairs who were present, including Châtellerault, then imitated the archbishop of Reims' act (kneeling before the king, kissing his hand and crying out Vivat Rex in Aeternum (Long live the king for eternity). A Te Deum then rang out in the Cathedral. After some more ritual and ceremony, the king exited the cathedral, proceeded by the princes du sang. Outside he was greeted by cries of 'Vive le Roi!' (Long live the king) from the gathered masses. With all the ceremonies said and done, François and the royal party made to return to Paris on 27 January.

=== Duc de Châtellerault ===
With the advent of François' reign, the house of Bourbon came in for gratification. The Bourbon-Montpensier saw the duc de Bourbon made connétable de France (Constable of France) the most senior military office in the kingdom with wide ranging powers and responsibilities. Meanwhile Châtellerault was elevated from the rank of a vicomte to a duc by the erection of the territory of Châtellerault into a duché in his favour. The Bourbon-Vendôme meanwhile saw the comté de Vendôme likewise elevated.

== Marignano campaign ==
=== Preparations ===
The conquests in the Italian peninsula of France had all been lost by 1515. There was much hunger to see this avenged among the soldiers and young nobles who looked to François to deliver them satisfaction. To this end, the new king renewed his agreement with England, received conditional promises of Venetian military support and the return of Genoese submission to France in return for concessions. The Genoese doge Ottaviano Fregoso promised to proffer military support for the fight against the Swiss. On 26 June, François announced his imminent departure for Italy to the 'good towns' of the kingdom. In his absence, his mother Louise would serve as the regent of France.

To support a campaign, François hired around 20,000 landsknechts (German pikemen) as infantry, as he was unable to enjoy the services of the Swiss. The landsknechts had a lesser military reputation than did their Swiss counterparts. The preparations the king was undertaking did not go unnoticed in Italy, and the duke of Milan, the Pope, the king of Aragon and the Holy Roman Emperor entered into a defensive accord to preserve Italy against him. Though this league appeared mighty on paper, in practice, the duke of Milan would primarily have to rely on the Swiss for support, though the Pope did send a force of 1,500 horse north into Piedmont under the command of the condotierri (a type of contract mercenary) Prospero Colonna.

Alongside the landsknechts, there would be a further 10,000 French infantry, under the command of Pedro Navarro. The king would have 3,000 hommes d'armes (men-at-arms) of the compagnies d'ordonnance (the heavy cavalry units that formed the core of the royal army), in addition to noble pensioners. A large amount of artillery was also brought.

Between Milan and France were the lands of Piedmont, which were considered to be neutral ground for the two camps. The Swiss and Milanese soldiers entered this territory so that they might meet the French as soon as they exited the Alps.

With word of French cavalry having arrived at Saluzzo on 11 August, the coalition endeavoured to determine which pass through the Alps the French might employ. Ten thousand infantry were dispatched to the Susa pass (the regular means of French egress into Italy), while Colonna took the other 8,000 to Saluzzo. The French army would however, not follow the old patterns, while a small contingent charted the Susa pass, the majority took a tougher route to the south-west of Susa. A further force travelled by sea, landing in Genoa and capturing Alessandria and Tortona.

Colonna was surprised by the maréchal de La Palice and maréchal d'Aubigny at Villafranca and his force was crushed. The Swiss were now left without their cavalry, and pulled back towards Milan. Novara, abandoned by the Swiss, was quickly captured by the French infantry with 700 lances (a heavy cavalry unit). Negotiations were now opened with the Swiss. Some cantons were favourable to a settlement by which they would abandon Milan in return for a large sum of money, and the compensation of the Milanese duke by the receipt of the duché de Nemours (a fief in France). Despite the seeming success of this negotiations, the majority of the Swiss were convinced to reject the deal.

François' army moved forward to the south of Milan, cutting the city off from Piacenza, where a Papal army was to be found alongside a Spanish one. The Venetians, under the command of D'Alviano were making to join with the French. This army set itself up in Lodi, nearby the French camp at Marignano, and d'Alviano headed to the latter place where François was planning an offensive against the Papal-Spanish army in Piacenza.

=== Battle of giants ===
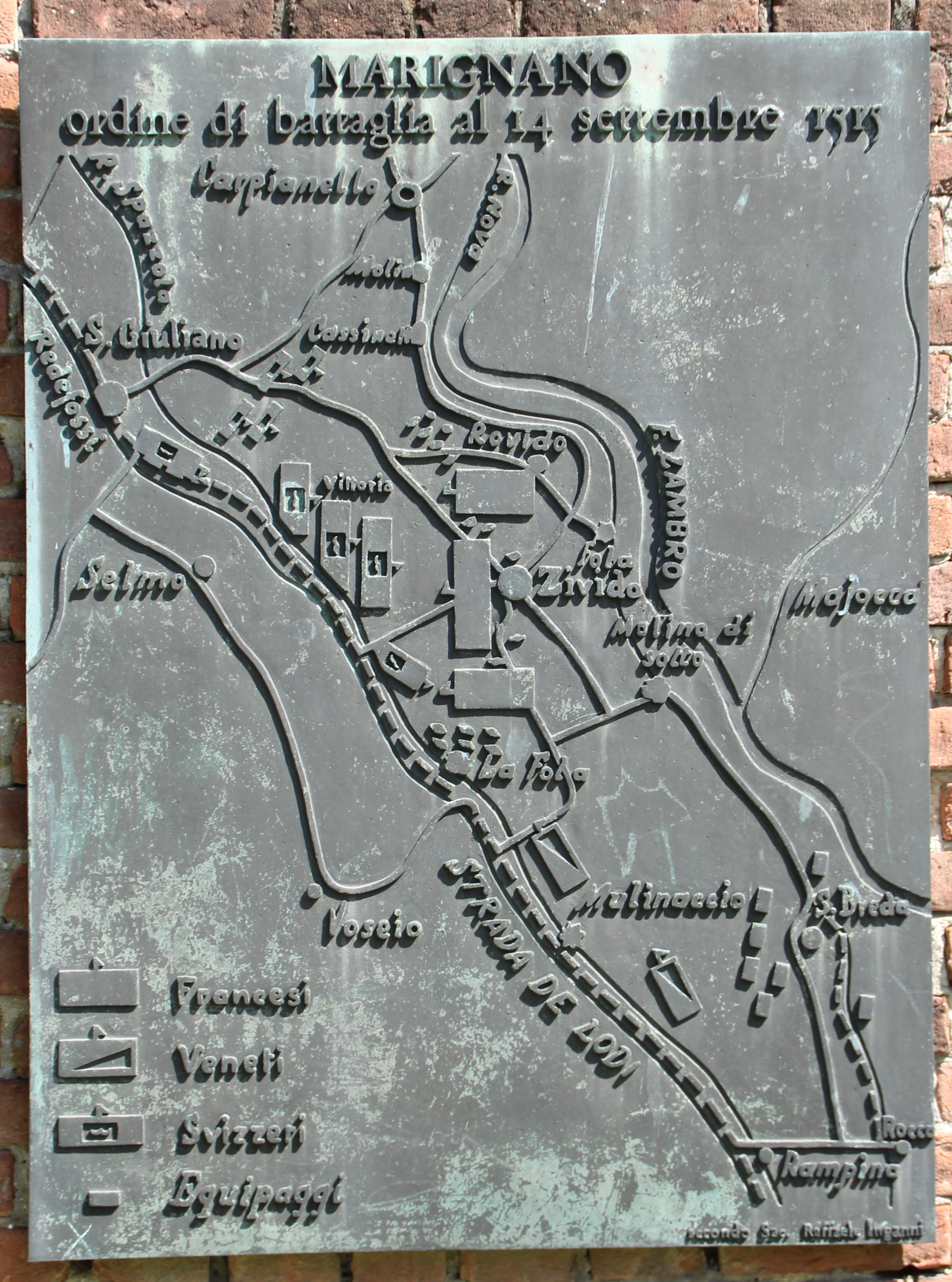
Order of battle on 14 September

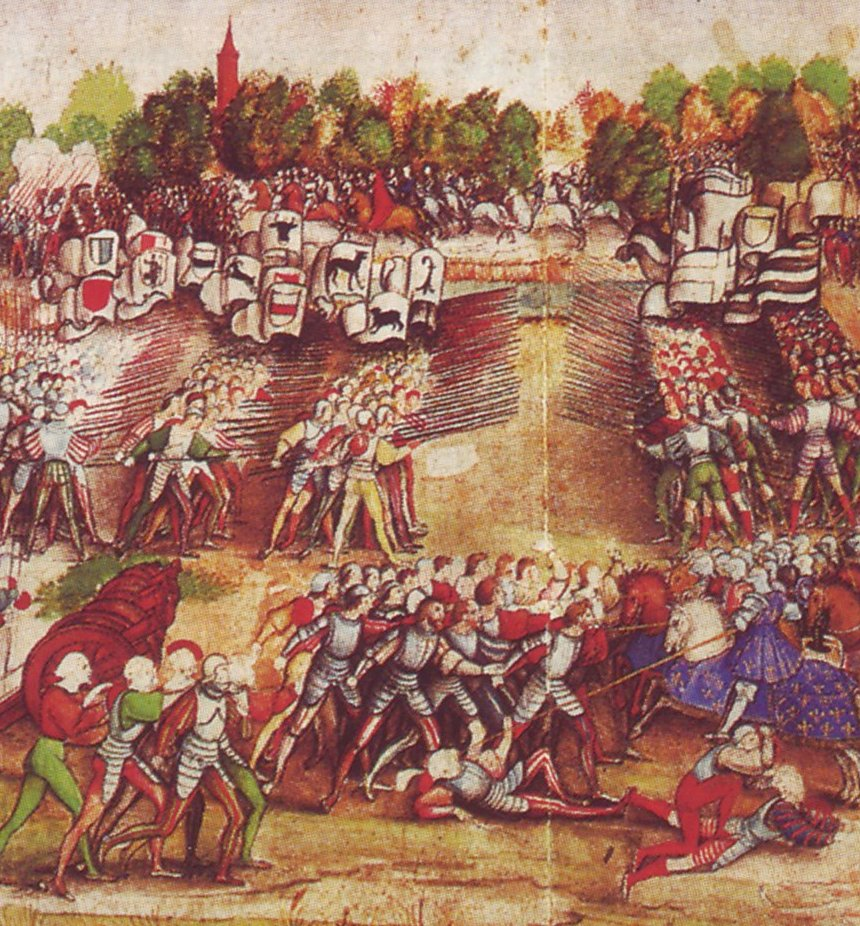
Battle of Marignano

Exiting Milan in the light of day on 13 September came three corps of barefooted Swiss soldiers, numbering around 7,000 each. They were accompanied by 500 Milanese cavalry. This force marched with haste in silence, but their stealth was compromised by the large cloud of dust raised by their numbers. The scouts alerted the connétable de Bourbon and the information then was transmitted to François. The king is supposed to have quickly given the alarm, and alerted the duc d'Alençon who was in command of the rear-guard. Bourbon had command of the vanguard (of which Châtellerault was a member), which was to be found at San Guiliano near Milan, which contained the artillery lined behind a trench with a row of shooters. A further ten thousand infantry protected the flanks and rear, while ten thousand landsknechts and 950 hommes d'armes were also with him. The battle (core of the army) was with the king a kilometre south around Santa Brigida with another 9,000 landsknechts and the cream of the gendarmerie under the command of François. Finally Alençon and the rear-guard was strung out a further three kilometres back, containing the armies cavalry. These components together formed a single camp.

Battle was joined by the Swiss at around four in the afternoon when one of the Swiss pike squares made to crash into Bourbon's vanguard. They were initially compelled to avoid the French artillery fire, but soon fell on the French soldiers. Châtellerault's brother Bourbon and the maréchal de La Palice led the hommes d'armes of the vanguard into the Swiss, but were rebuffed by the pikeman and forced to retreat back to their foot soldiers. The Swiss succeeded in throwing the landsknechts of the vanguard into disarray.

The battle was going poorly for the French, and the Swiss seemed liable to soon seize the French artillery. At this moment, François and his hommes d'armes rushed into the fray. They forced a band of the Swiss to throw down their arms, and another to retreat. The king then rallied several thousand of the landsknechts and some hommes d'armes and was able to prevent another group of Swiss from taking the artillery, forcing them to retreat back across the ditch they had crossed. Bourbon for his part was able to drive off some more Swiss from his position. Fighting continued until around midnight when the moon disappeared from view, and it was no longer possible to continue fighting.

François took advantage of the interlude to spin off a letter to Alviano, imploring his Venetian ally to hurry and join with them. Fighting resumed with daybreak, the French artillery pounding the Swiss. The battle began to go poorly for the French again. On the wings things were better, according to the writer de Marillac, and after a group of Swiss had invaded his lodgings, the duc de Bourbon's aventuriers (volunteers) were able to massacre the Swiss there. Meanwhile on the right flank, commanded by Alençon the Swiss were contained. The king was in great personal danger at this time, receiving several pike wounds, while many of his nobles fled the field towards Marignano. The arrival of the Venetians, summoned during the night by the king, turned the tide. The Venetian cavalry arrived to cries of 'San Marco! San Marco!' With their allies arriving, the courage of the French was bolstered, and the Swiss were thrown into disorder. By eleven in the morning, the battle was over, and the king retired to his lodgings to give thanks to god for the victory.

In the aftermath of the battle, François wrote to his mother Louise on the casualties of the battle. He put the number of dead Swiss at 25,000 and the casualties of the French at 4,000. In his letters to the cities of France he moderated the number of Swiss casualties, lowering the total to fifteen or sixteen thousand. Another estimate of the casualties published in Augsburg put the French losses at 14,000 infantry, to the Swiss 16,535. The Milanese chronicler Prato put the Swiss losses at 10,000 and the French losses at 7,000. The modern historian Le Roux ultimately places the killed at 8,000 for the Swiss, and around 6,000 for the French.

It was not instantly possible to identify all the casualties of the fighting, this taking several days to accomplish. Approximately 200 French nobles had been killed. Among the 'great nobility', the body of the comte de Sancerre and the seigneur de Bussy were found on the field. The son of the vicomte de Thouars, the prince de Talmont who had been in the vanguard was mortally wounded, having received around 20 wounds to the face and neck, he died the day after the battle. According to Le Roux, the duc de Châtellerault was also mortally wounded by the combat. Le Fur reports instead that Châtellerault was killed in the first hours of the combat, on 13 September.

The bodies of the great nobles like Châtellerault killed at Marignano were embalmed and then put in lead lined coffins so that they might be brought back to France for burial. Meanwhile, Châtellerault's brother, the duc de Bourbon, would give the order for the burial of other soldiers on the site of the battle.

After his death, control of the lands of Châtellerault would fall to his elder brother, the duc de Bourbon. All the ducs lands were then in turn sequestered in 1523.

== Sources ==
- Crouzet, Denis (2003). Charles de Bourbon: Connétable de France. Fayard.
- Dupont-Pierrart, Nicole (2017). Claire de Gonzague Comtesse de Bourbon-Montpensier (1464-1503): Une Princesse Italienne à la Cour de France. Presses Universitaires du Septentrion.
- Hamon, Philippe (2021a). "BOURBON, Charles de, connétable (?, 17 février 1490 - Rome, 6 mai 1527)". In Jouanna, Arlette; Hamon, Philippe; Biloghi, Dominique; Le Thiec, Guy (eds.). La France de La Renaissance: Histoire et Dictionnaire. Bouquins.
- Hamon, Philippe (2021b). "MONTPENSIER, Gilbert de (vers 1443 ? - Pouzzoles, 9 novembre 1496)". In Jouanna, Arlette; Hamon, Philippe; Biloghi, Dominique; Le Thiec, Guy (eds.). La France de La Renaissance: Histoire et Dictionnaire. Bouquins.
- Jouanna, Arlette (2021). "Le Temps de la Renaissance en France (vers 1470-1559)". In Jouanna, Arlette; Hamon, Philippe; Biloghi, Dominique; Le Thiec, Guy (eds.). La France de La Renaissance: Histoire et Dictionnaire. Bouquins.
- Knecht, Robert (1994). Renaissance Warrior and Patron: The Reign of Francis I. Cambridge University Press.
- Knecht, Robert (1996). The Rise and Fall of Renaissance France. Fontana Press.
- Knecht, Robert (2004). "Marignan: François Ier «vainquer des Suisses»". In Arminjon, Catherine; Lavalle, Denis; Chatenet, Monique; Anthenaise, Claude d' (eds.). De L'Italie à Chambord: François Ier et la Chevauchée des Princes Français.
- Le Fur, Didier (2018). François Ier. Perrin.
- Le Roux, Nicolas (2015). 1515: L'Invention de La Renaissance. Armand Colin.
- Mallett, Michael; Shaw, Christine (2019). The Italian Wars 1494-1559: War, State and Society in Early Modern Europe. Routledge.
- Quilliet, Bernard (1986). Louis XII: Père du Peuple. Fayard.
- Quilliet, Bernard (1998). La France du Beau XVIe Siècle. Fayard.

| Preceded by Title created | Duke of Châtellerault; 1514-1515 | Succeeded by Charles |
