= Clara Gonzaga =

Italian noblewoman

- Countess of Montpensier; Dauphine of Auvergne; Duchess of Sessa
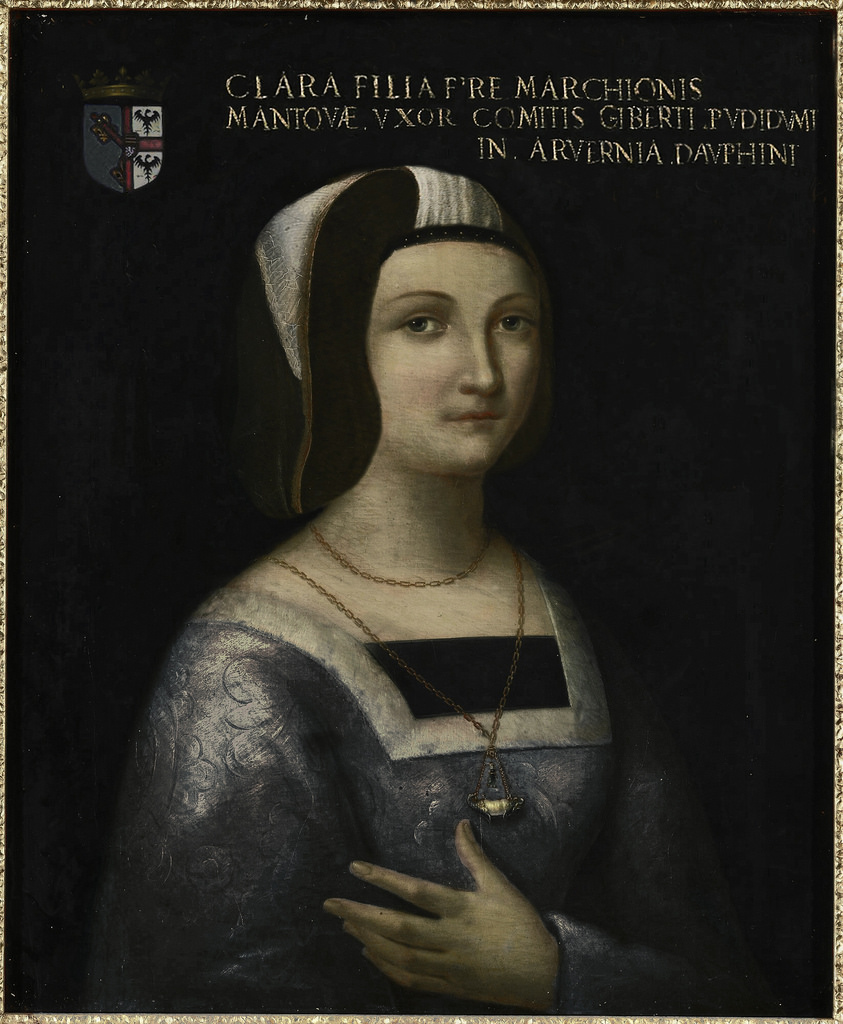
- A 19th century portrait of Clara Gonzaga.
- Born: 1 July 1464; Mantua, Italy
- Died: 2 June 1503 (aged 38); France
- Noble family: Gonzaga
- Spouse: Gilbert, Count of Montpensier (m. 1482; died 1496)
- Issue: Louis II, Count of Montpensier; Charles III, Duke of Bourbon; François, Duke of Châtellerault; Louise de Bourbon, Duchess of Montpensier; Renée, Duchess of Lorraine; Anne
- Father: Federico I Gonzaga, Marquess of Mantua
- Mother: Margaret of Bavaria

Clara Gonzaga, Countess of Montpensier, Dauphine of Auvergne, Duchess of Sessa (Italian: Chiara Gonzaga; French: Claire (de) Gonzague; 1 July 1464 – 2 June 1503) was an Italian noblewoman of the House of Gonzaga. She was the daughter of Federico I Gonzaga, Marquess of Mantua and the wife of Gilbert, Count of Montpensier.

One of her six children was Charles III, Duke of Bourbon, who led the Imperial Army sent by Emperor Charles V against Pope Clement VII in what became the Sack of Rome, and where he was subsequently killed.

Clara is one of the characters in the Heptaméron, printed in 1558, which was written by Marguerite de Navarre, Queen of Navarre and sister of King Francis I of France.

== Family ==
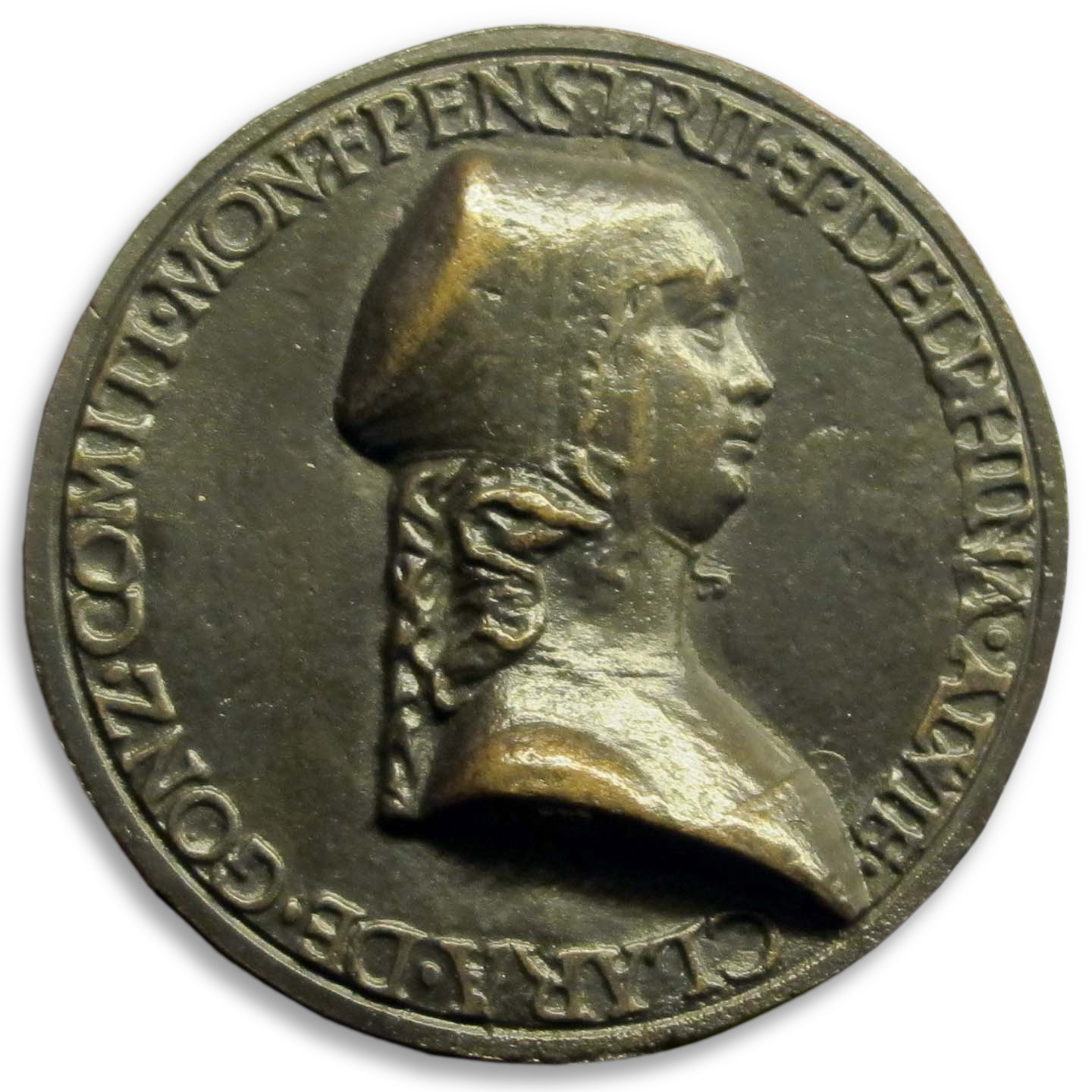
A medal portrait of Clara Gonzaga by Bartolomeo Melioli.

Clara was born in Mantua on 1 July 1464, the eldest daughter of Federico I Gonzaga, Marquess of Mantua and Margaret of Bavaria. She had five siblings including Francesco II Gonzaga, Marquess of Mantua whose wife was the celebrated Isabella d'Este.

Clara's paternal grandparents were Ludovico III Gonzaga and Barbara of Brandenburg; and her maternal grandparents were Albert III, Duke of Bavaria and Anna of Brunswick-Grubenhagen-Einbeck, daughter of Duke Erich I of Brunswick-Salzderhelden and Elisabeth of Brunswick-Göttingen.

== Marriage and issue ==
On 24 February 1482, in Mantua, at the age of seventeen, Clara married Gilbert of Bourbon-Montpensier, who in 1486 succeeded his father as Count of Montpensier and Dauphin of Auvergne. He was also Viceroy of Naples (1495), and the Duke of Sessa. He was the son of Louis I, Count of Montpensier and Joan, Dauphine of Auvergne. The marriage had been arranged by Clara's uncle Francesco Secco of Aragon who accompanied the newly-wed couple from Mantua to Milan on their lengthy journey to their home in France.

Gilbert and Clara had six children:

- Louis II, Count of Montpensier (1483 – 14 August 1501), died unmarried.
- Charles III, Duke of Bourbon, Count of Montpensier, Dauphin of Auvergne, Constable of France (17 February 1490 – 6 May 1527 Rome). He led the Imperial Army sent by Emperor Charles V against Pope Clement in what became the Sack of Rome, where he was killed. Married Suzanne, Duchess of Bourbon, daughter of Anne of France and Peter II, Duke of Bourbon. His children by Suzanne all died young.
- François, Duke of Châtellerault (1492 – 13 September 1515 at the Battle of Marignano)
- Louise de Bourbon, Duchess of Montpensier (1482 – 5 July 1561) In 1499, she married as her first husband Andre III de Chauvigny, Prince of Deols, Viscount de Brosse; on 21 March 1504, she married secondly, her cousin Louis of Bourbon, Prince of La Roche-sur-Yon, by whom she had three children.
- Renée, Lady of Mercœur (1494 – 26 May 1539), married Antoine, Duke of Lorraine, by whom she had six children.
- Anne (1495–1510)

== Widowhood and death ==
On 15 October 1496, in Pozzuoli, Italy, Clara's husband Gilbert (who had been the Viceroy of Naples since 1495), died of a fever, leaving her a widow at the age of thirty-two.

In 1499, Clara acted as mediator on behalf of her brother Francesco, who sought to form an alliance with King Louis XII of France in order to protect Mantua, which was then being threatened by both Cesare Borgia and the Doge of Venice.

She maintained a correspondence with her sister-in-law, Isabella d'Este.

Clara died on 2 June 1503. She was not quite thirty-nine years old. She was buried at the Chapelle Saint-Louis in the church of Aigueperse in Auvergne.

== Legacy ==
Clara Gonzaga appears as a character in the Heptaméron (first printed 1558), written by Marguerite de Navarre, Queen of Navarre and sister of King Francis I of France.

== Sources ==
- Antenhofer, Christina (2011). "From Local "Signori" to European High Nobility: The Gonzaga Family Networks in the Fifteenth Century". In Johnson, Christopher H.; Teuscher, Simon; Sabean, David Warren; Trivellato, Francesca (eds.). Transregional and Transnational Families in Europe and Beyond: Experiences Since the Middle Ages. Berghahn Books. pp. 55–74.
- Dupont-Pierrart, Nicole (2017). Claire de Gonzague Comtesse de Bourbon-Montpensier (1464-1503) (in French). Presses Universitie Septentrion. ISBN 9782757416129.
- James, Carolyn (2020). A Renaissance Marriage: The Political and Personal Alliance of Isabella d'Este & Francesco Gonzaga, 1490-1519. Oxford University Press.
- Ward, A.W.; Prothero, G.W.; Leathes, Stanley, eds. (1911). The Cambridge Modern History. Vol. XIII. Cambridge at the University Press.
