= List of consorts of Montpensier =

== Countess of Montpensier ==
=== House of Valois, 1362?–1434 ===
| Picture | Name | Father | Birth | Marriage | Became Countess | Ceased to be Countess | Death | Spouse |
|---|---|---|---|---|---|---|---|---|
| | Marie, Lady of Sully | Louis, Lord of Sully (Sully) | 4 February 1378 | 1381 | | 1382 husband's death | - | Charles, Count of Montpensier |
| | Catherine of Valois | Charles V of France (Valois) | 4 February 1378 | 5 August 1386 | | October/November 1388 | | Jean, Count of Montpensier |
| | Anne de Bourbon-La Marche | John I, Count of La Marche (Bourbon-La Marche) | 1380 | 1390 or 1401 | | 1401 husband's death | September 1408 | Jean, Count of Montpensier |
| | Joan II, Countess of Auvergne | John II, Count of Auvergne (Auvergne) | 1378 | 5 June 1390 | 1401 stepson's death | 15 March 1416 husband's death | shortly before 6 February 1423 | John, Duke of Berry |

=== House of Bourbon-Montpensier, 1434–1523 ===
| Picture | Name | Father | Birth | Marriage | Became Countess | Ceased to be Countess | Death | Spouse |
|---|---|---|---|---|---|---|---|---|
| | Jeanne, Dauphine of Auvergne | Béraud III, Dauphin of Auvergne | 1412 | 8 December 1426 | June 1434 husband's accession | 26 May 1436 | | Louis I, Count of Montpensier |
| | Gabrielle de La Tour | Bertrand V, Count of Auvergne (La Tour d'Auvergne) | - | 15/6 February 1443 | | May 1486 husband's death | 1486 | Louis I, Count of Montpensier |
| | Clara Gonzaga | Federico I Gonzaga (Gonzaga) | 1 July 1464 | 24 February 1482 | May 1486 husband's accession | 15 October 1496 husband's death | 2 June 1503 | Gilbert, Count of Montpensier |
| | Suzanne, Duchess of Bourbon | Peter II, Duke of Bourbon (Bourbon) | 10 May 1491 | 10 May 1505 | | 28 April 1521 | | Charles III, Duke of Bourbon |

== Duchess of Montpensier ==
=== House of Bourbon-Vendôme, 1561–1627 ===
| Picture | Name | Father | Birth | Marriage | Became Duchess | Ceased to be Duchess | Death | Spouse |
|---|---|---|---|---|---|---|---|---|
| | Jacqueline de Longwy, Countess of Bar-sur-Seine | Jean IV de Longwy, Seigneur de Givry (Longwy) | before 1520 | 1538 | 5 July 1561 husband's accession | 28 August 1561 | | Louis, Duke of Montpensier |
| | Catherine of Lorraine | Francis, Duke of Guise (Lorraine) | 18 July 1552 | 4 February 1570 | | 23 September 1582 husband's death | 6 May 1596 | Louis, Duke of Montpensier |
| | Renée d'Anjou, Marquise de Mezieres | Nicolas d'Anjou, Marquis de Mezieres | 21 October 1550 | 1566 | 23 September 1582 husband's accession | 1590 | | François, Duke of Montpensier |
| | Henriette Catherine, Duchess of Joyeuse | Henri de Joyeuse (Joyeuse) | 8 January 1585 | 15 May 1597 | | 27 February 1608 husband's death | 25 February 1656 | Henri, Duke of Montpensier |

=== House of Bourbon-Orléans ===
| Picture | Name | Father | Birth | Marriage | Became Duchess | Ceased to be Duchess | Death | Spouse |
|---|---|---|---|---|---|---|---|---|
| | Luisa Fernanda of Spain | Ferdinand VII of Spain (Bourbon) | 30 January 1832 | 10 October 1846 | | 4 February 1890 husband's death | 2 February 1897 | Prince Antoine |

=== House of Bourbon-Orléans (in pretence) ===
| Picture | Name | Father | Birth | Marriage | Became Duchess | Ceased to be Duchess | Death | Spouse |
|---|---|---|---|---|---|---|---|---|
| | Maria Isabel González de Olañeta y Ibarreta, 3rd Marchioness of Valdeterrazo | Ulpiano González de Olañeta y González de Ocampo, 2nd Marquis of Valdeterrazo | 22 April 1895 | 20 August 1921 | | 30 January 1924 husband's death | 11 July 1958 | Prince Ferdinand |
| | Duchess Marie Thérèse of Württemberg | Philipp Albrecht, Duke of Württemberg (Württemberg) | 12 November 1934 | 3 February 1984 | 1984 divorce | Incumbent (in pretence) | | Prince Henri |

== See also ==
- Duchess of Berry
- List of consorts of Bourbon
- List of consorts of Orléans
- List of consorts of Auvergne
