= List of counts and dukes of Montpensier =

Rulers of Montpensier

The French lordship of Montpensier (named after the village of Montpensier, département of Puy-de-Dôme), located in historical Auvergne, became a countship in the 14th century.

It changed hands from the House of Thiern, to the House of Beaujeau, to the House of Drieux, to the House of Beaujeau again, and finally to the House of Ventadour, before it was sold in 1384 by Bernard and Robert de Ventadour to John, Duke of Berry, whose sons Charles and John were the first two to hold the title of Count of Montpensier.

After their deaths without issue, their younger sister Marie brought the countship to her third husband, John I, Duke of Bourbon (1381–1434). The countship was subsequently held by Louis de Bourbon, the younger son of John and Marie, and by his descendants up to Charles de Bourbon-Montpensier, the famous constable, who became duke of Bourbon by his marriage with his cousin, Suzanne de Bourbon, in 1505.

In 1384–1434 and 1505–27, Montpensier followed the succession in Duchy of Auvergne, and from 1434 onwards that of Dauphinate of Auvergne.

Confiscated by King Francis I, the countship was restored in 1538 to Louise de Bourbon, sister of the Constable of France, and widow of the prince de La Roche-sur-Yon, and to her son Louis, and was erected into a duchy in the peerage of France (duché-pairie) in 1539. Marie, daughter and heiress of Henry, Duke of Montpensier, brought the duchy to her husband Gaston, Duke of Orléans, brother of Louis XIII, whom she married in 1626, and their daughter and heiress, known as La Grande Mademoiselle was duchess of Montpensier.

When Mademoiselle Anne died childless, her heir (but an ancestress' Huguenot marriage after being a nun may have been regarded invalid) was Elisabeth Charlotte, Princess Palatine, the then wife of Duke of Orléans. The title subsequently remained in the Orléans family, and was borne in particular by Antoine Philippe (1775-1807), son of Philippe Egalité, and by Antoine Marie Philippe Louis (1824-1890), son of King Louis Philippe I and father-in-law of King Alphonso XII of Spain. Mademoiselle de Montpensier was a title conferred upon some women of the royal family, namely during the years previous to the French Revolution.

== Seigneurs of Montpensier (12th century) ==
1. Guy of Thiers, Seigneur of Montpensier
2. Agnès of Thiers, Dame of Montpensier - daughter who married Humbert IV of Beaujeu, Sire of Beaujeu and Seigneur of Montpensier (Humbert I)
3. Guichard I of Beaujeu, Seigneur of Montpensier - son
4. Guichard II of Beaujeu, Seigneur of Montpensier - son
5. Humbert II of Beaujeu, Seigneur of Montpensier - son
6. Jeanne of Beaujeu, Dame of Montpensier (Jeanne I) - daughter who married Jean II of Drieux, Count of Dreux, Seigneur of Montpensier (Jean I)
7. Robert V of Dreux, Seigneur of Montpensier - son
8. Jean III of Dreux, Seigneur of Montpensier (Jean II) - brother
9. Pierre of Dreux, Seigneur of Montpensier brother
10. Jeanne I of Dreux, Dame of Montpensier (Jeanne II) - daughter
11. Louis I of Beaujeu, Seigneur of Montpensier - descendant of a brother of Humbert II of Beaujeu, Seigneur of Montpensier
12. Marguerite of Beaujeu, Dame of Montpensier - daughter who married Ebles VIII of Ventadour, Viscount of Ventadour, Seigneur of Montpensier
13. Bernard of Ventadour, Seigneur of Montpensier (1346–1384) - son

== Counts of Montpensier (1384) ==
1. Charles de Valois, Count of Montpensier (1362–1382) - son of John de Valois, Duke of Berry and Auvergne
2. John de Valois, Count of Montpensier (1363–1401) - brother
3. Marie of Valois, Countess of Montpensier (1375–1434) - sister of John; in 1400 she married John I, Duke of Bourbon
4. Louis I de Bourbon, Count of Montpensier (1405–1486) - third and younger surviving son
5. Gilbert de Bourbon, Count of Montpensier (1448–1496) - son of Louis I
6. Louis II de Bourbon, Count of Montpensier (1483–1501) - son of Gilbert
7. Charles III de Bourbon, Count of Montpensier (1490–1527) - brother of Louis II

== Dukes of Montpensier (1539) ==
1. Louise de Bourbon, Duchess of Montpensier (1482–1561) - sister of Charles III
2. Louis de Bourbon, Duke of Montpensier (1513–1582) - son of Louise
3. François de Bourbon, Duke of Montpensier (1542–1592) - son of Louis
4. Henri de Bourbon, Duke of Montpensier (1573–1608) - son of François
5. Marie de Bourbon, Duchess of Montpensier (1605–1627) - daughter of Henri
6. Anne Marie Louise d'Orléans, Duchess of Montpensier (La Grande Mademoiselle) (1627–1693) - daughter of Marie
7. Philippe de France, Duke of Orléans (1640–1701) - first cousin of Anne Marie Louise, given title in 1695 by Louis XIV
8. Philippe d'Orléans, Duke of Orléans, Duke of Montpensier (1674–1723) - son of Philippe
9. Louis d'Orléans, Duke of Orléans, Duke of Montpensier (1703–1752) - son of Philippe
10. Louis Philippe d'Orléans, Duke of Orléans, Duke of Montpensier (1725–1785) - son of Louis
11. Philippe d'Orléans, Duke of Orléans, Duke of Montpensier (Philippe Égalité) (1747–1793) - son of Louis Philippe I
12. Louis Philippe d'Orléans, King of the French, Duke of Montpensier (1773–1850) - son of Louis Philippe Joseph
13. Philippe d'Orléans, Count of Paris, Duke of Montpensier (1838–1894) - grandson of Louis Philippe
14. Philippe d'Orléans, Duke of Orléans, Duke of Montpensier (1869–1926) - son of Philippe
15. Jean d'Orléans, Duke of Guise, Duke of Montpensier (1874–1940) - cousin of Philippe
16. Henri d'Orléans, Count of Paris, Duke of Montpensier (1908–1999) - son of Jean
17. Henri d'Orléans, Count of Paris, Duke of France, Duke of Montpensier (born 1933-2019) - son of Henri
18. Jean d'Orléans, Count of Paris, Duke of Vendôme (born 1965) - son of Henri

== Courtesy title ==
The title Duke of Montpensier has been used as a courtesy title by other members of the House of Orléans:

- Antoine Philippe d'Orléans, Duke of Montpensier (1775–1807) second son of Louis Philippe II, Duke of Orléans
- Antoine d'Orléans, Duke of Montpensier (1824–1890) youngest son of Louis Philippe, King of the French
- Duchess Marie Therese of Württemberg, Duchess of Montpensier (born 1934), wife of Henri, comte de Paris, duc de France

== See also ==
- List of consorts of Montpensier
- House of Bourbon
- House of Bourbon-Montpensier
- House of Orléans
- La Princesse de Montpensier (novella)
- La Princesse de Montpensier
