= Gilbert, Count of Montpensier =

French aristocrat (1443–1496)

Gilbert
- Count of Montpensier
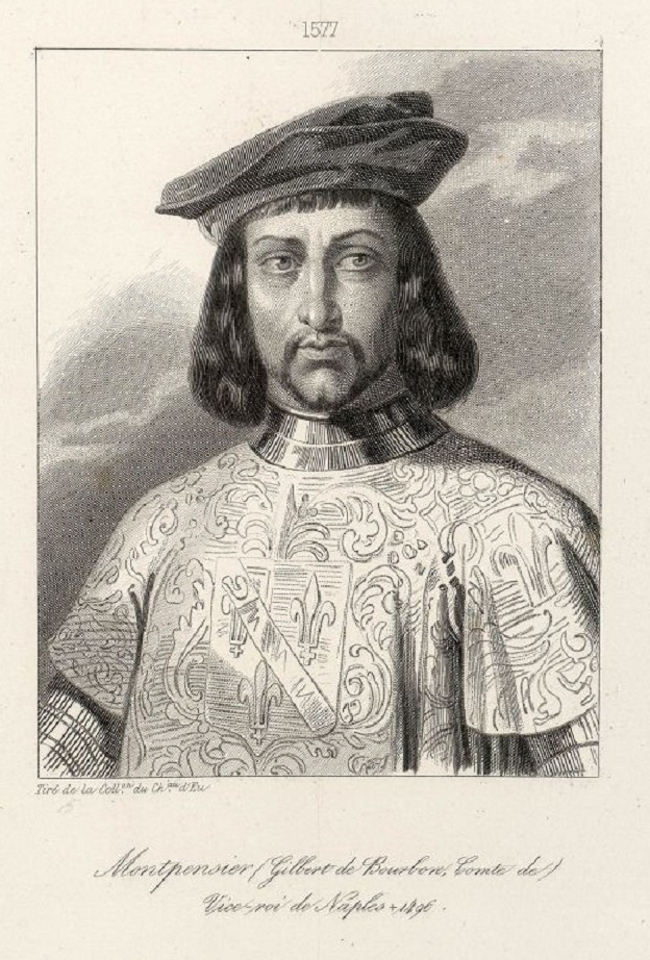
- Born: 1443
- Died: 15 October 1496 (aged 52–53); Pozzuoli
- Noble family: Bourbon-Montpensier
- Spouse: Clara Gonzaga (m. 1482)
- Issue: Louise de Bourbon, Duchess of Montpensier; Louis II, Count of Montpensier; Charles III, Duke of Bourbon; François, Duke of Châtellerault; Renée of Bourbon; Anne
- Father: Louis de Bourbon
- Mother: Gabrielle de La Tour d'Auvergne

Gilbert de Bourbon (1443 – 15 October 1496, Pozzuoli), Count of Montpensier, was a member of the House of Bourbon. He was the son of Louis I, Count of Montpensier and Gabrielle de La Tour d'Auvergne, Count of Montpensier and Dauphin d'Auvergne. He was appointed to the Order of Saint Michael by King Charles VIII of France in October 1483.

== Life ==
Gilbert was the first person, after a number of divisions of Auvergne in the Middle Ages, to carry the bloodlines of the respective dynasties of each of the three main divisions of Auvergne, the countship, the dukedom and the dauphinate.

His paternal grandmother Marie of Berry, Duchess of Bourbon, was heiress to the duchy of Auvergne. The creation for the Berry and Bourbon branches was made of lands that were confiscated from the count of Auvergne by Philip II of France. His paternal great-grandmother Anne of Auvergne was daughter of the Dauphin of Auvergne and after the extinction of her brother's line, in her issue the heiress thereof. Though Gilbert was by no means the primogenitural heir to any of them, as head of the cadet branch of his family, he received Montpensier and the dauphinate as appanages inside the extended family.

=== Marriage and issue ===
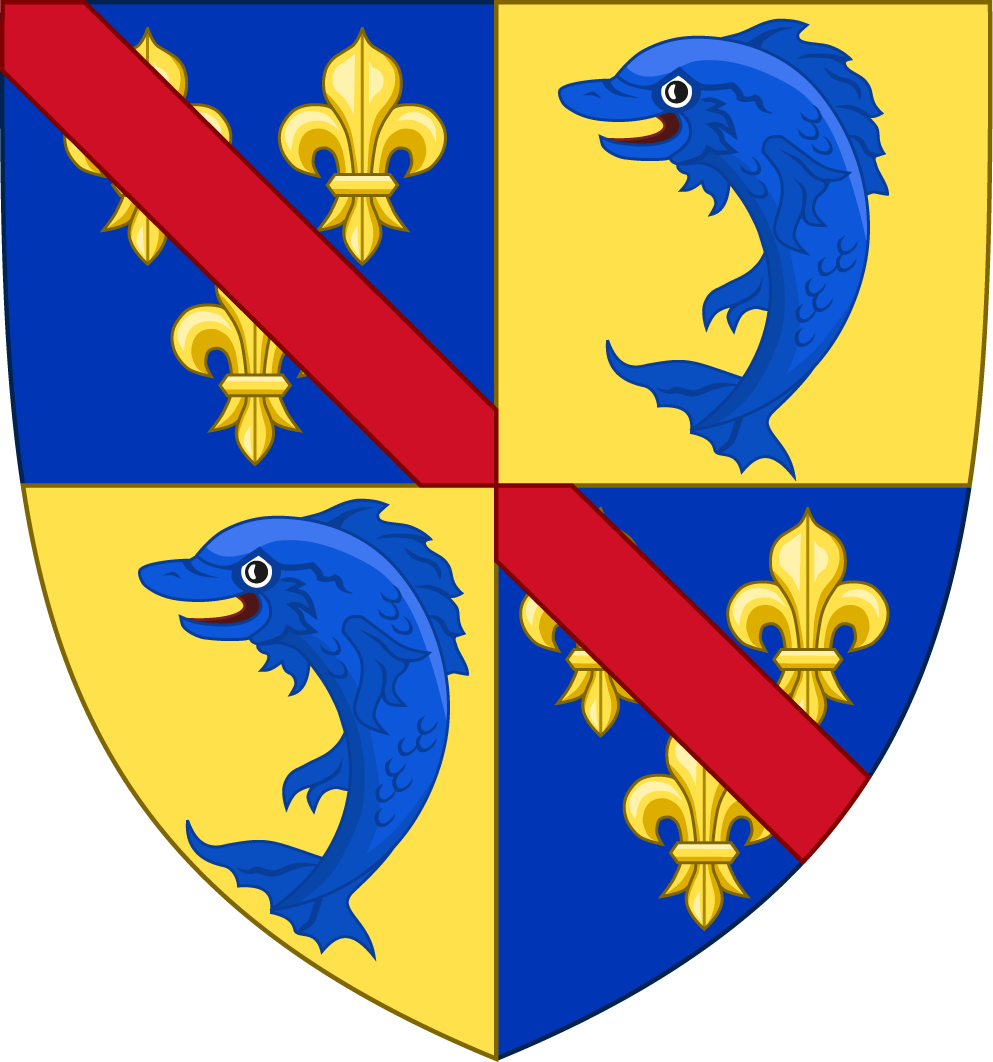
The coat of arms of Gilbert, Count of Montpensier.

On 24 February 1482 Gilbert married Clara Gonzaga (1 July 1464 – 2 June 1503), daughter of Federico I of Gonzaga of Mantua; they had the following issue:

- Louise, Duchess of Montpensier (1482 – 15 July 1561), eventually the heiress of all the Bourbon estates, but not titles
- Louis II, Count of Montpensier (1483 – 14 August 1501)
- Charles III, Duke of Bourbon (17 February 1490 – 6 May 1527, in battle),
- François, Duke of Châtellerault (1492 – 13 September 1515, Battle of Marignano)
- Renée, Lady of Mercœur (1494 – 26 May 1539, Nancy), married on 26 June 1515 at the Château d'Amboise to Antoine, Duke of Lorraine
- Anne (1495 – 1510, Spain)

=== Viceroy of Naples ===
Gilbert was made the Viceroy of Naples in 1495 after king Charles VIII of France occupied the city in the Italian War of 1494–1495. In July 1496, Montpensier was captured at the Siege of Atella with the remaining French forces, he and his men were held in a malarial marshland near Pozzuoli, where he later died.

== See also ==
- Duke of Bourbon

== Sources ==
- Bogdan, Henry (2013). La Lorraine des ducs (in French). Tempus.
- Boulton, D'Arcy Jonathan Dacre (2000). The Knights of the Crown. The Boydell Press.
- Mallett, Michael; Shaw, Christine (2012). The Italian Wars 1494-1559. Pearson Education Limited.
- Nicolle, David (2004). Fornovo 1495: France's Bloody Fighting Retreat. Osprey.
- Ward, A.W.; Prothero, G.W.; Leathes, Stanley, eds. (1911). The Cambridge Modern History. Vol. XIII. Cambridge at the University Press.

Gilbert, Count of Montpensier House of Bourbon-Montpensier Born: 1443 Died: 15 October 1496
Preceded by Louis I	Count of Clermont-en-Auvergne and Montpensier; Dauphin d'Auvergne; 1486–1496	Succeeded by Louis II
