= Duke of Châtellerault =

French noble title

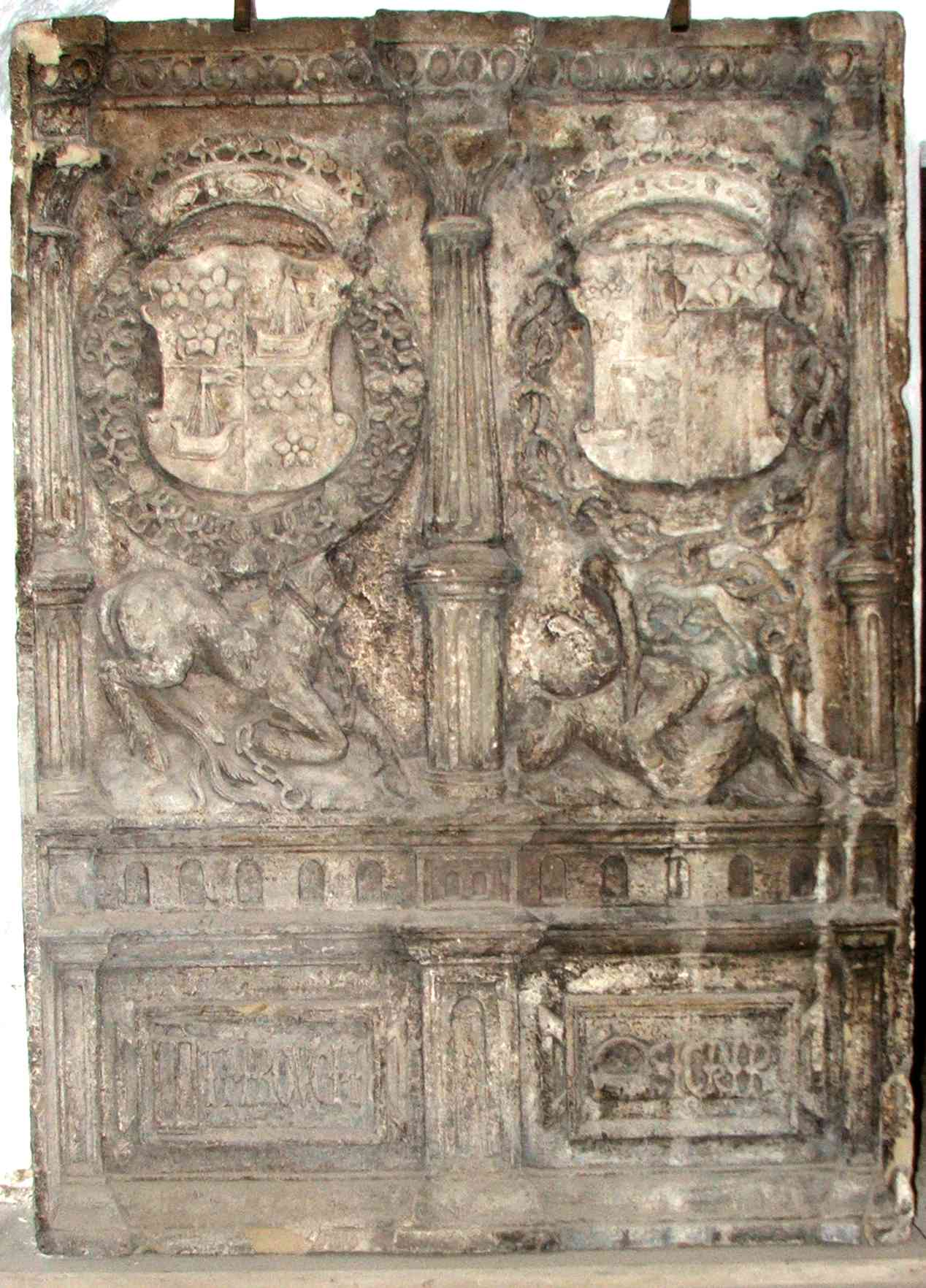
- Armorial stone of Regent Arran and Lady Margaret Douglas at Kinneil House (Historic Scotland)
- Creation date: 1492
- First holder: François de Bourbon-Montpensier, 1st Duke of Châtellerault
- Last holder: William Alexander Louis Stephen Douglas-Hamilton, 2nd Duke of Châtellerault
- Extinction date: 1895

Duke of Châtellerault (French: duc de Châtellerault) is a French noble title that has been created several times, originally in the Peerage of France in 1515. It takes its name from Châtellerault, in the Vienne region.

The first title was created for François de Bourbon-Montpensier, a younger son of Gilbert, Comte de Montpensier, who was created Viscount of Châtellerault (Vicomte de Châtellerault) in February 1514. He received the duchy-peerage of Châtellerault in 1515, but was killed the same year, being succeeded by his brother Charles, jure uxoris Duke of Bourbon and Auvergne. This title was confiscated in 1527 after the Duke, who was Constable of France, betrayed the King by allying himself with the Emperor Charles V.

The duchies of Châtellerault and Bourbon were then conferred on Louise of Savoy, the mother of King Francis I, but the latter title became extinct in 1530 when she ceded the territory of the duchy to Louis de Bourbon, Prince de la Roche-sur-Yon and later also Duc de Montpensier. However, the dukedom was again conferred on Louise of Savoy that year, and she retained it until her death in 1532.

The dukedom was next created for Louise's grandson Charles, son of King Francis I, who was created Duke of Orléans, Duke of Châtellerault and Duke of Angoulême in 1544. He died unmarried in 1545, when these titles became extinct.

The next creation of the dukedom was in 1548, for James Hamilton, 2nd Earl of Arran, and Regent of Scotland, who arranged the marriage of Mary, Queen of Scots, to the Dauphin Francis, son of King Henry II, and who had been promised a duchy by the Treaty of Châtillon, 1548. However, he turned against the Queen in 1559, and his French estates and title were confiscated.

The next recipient of the dukedom was Diane de France, legitimated daughter of Henry II and Filippa Duci, in 1563. However, she exchanged Châtellerault for the duchy of Angoulême in 1582.

The next year, the dukedom was given to François, Duke of Montpensier, son of Louis above-mentioned, in 1584. His granddaughter Marie, Duchesse de Montpensier, in 1626 married Gaston, Duke of Orléans, son of King Henry IV, and their daughter Anne-Marie-Louise, "La Grande Mademoiselle", inherited the dukedoms of Montpensier and Châtellerault. She died in 1693, when the titles became extinct, and left the territory of the dukedom to her paternal first cousin Philip I, Duke of Orléans, son of King Louis XIII.

In the 1720s, he sold the lands to Frédéric Guillaume de la Trémoille, Prince de Talmont, whose son Anne-Charles-Frédéric was created Duke of Châtellerault in 1730. He succeeded his father as Prince de Talmont in 1738 and died without issue in 1759, when the dukedom became extinct, and the lands passed to another branch of the La Trémoille family.

That was the last legally defined creation of the dukedom, but in 1864, the Hamilton creation of 1548 was revived by the Emperor Napoleon III. However, this revival was neither in favour of the heir under the original letters patent, the 14th Earl of Derby, nor in favour of the heir-male, the 2nd Marquess of Abercorn, but rather in favour of the 12th Duke of Hamilton, who was a third cousin once removed of the Emperor through his mother the former Princess Marie Elisabeth of Baden. He died without male issue in 1895, and was succeeded as Duke of Hamilton by his fourth cousin Alfred, Duke of Hamilton. The Dukes of Hamilton and the Dukes of Abercorn have since then used the title in France, though without any legal justification.

== Dukes of Châtellerault, first creation (1515) ==
- François de Bourbon-Montpensier, 1st Duke of Châtellerault (1492–1515)
- Charles de Bourbon-Montpensier, 2nd Duke of Châtellerault (1490–1527), title forfeit 1527

== Dukes of Châtellerault, second and third creations (1527 and 1530) ==
- Louise of Savoy (1476–1532)

== Dukes of Châtellerault, fourth creation (1540) ==
- Charles de Valois, 1st Duke of Orléans and Châtellerault (1522–1545)

== Dukes of Châtellerault, fifth creation (1548) ==
- James Hamilton, 1st Duke of Châtellerault (1515–1575)

== Dukes of Châtellerault, sixth creation (1563) ==
- Diane de France, 1st Duchess of Châtellerault (1538–1619), duchy exchanged for that of Angoulême in 1582

== Dukes of Châtellerault, seventh creation (1583) ==
- François de Bourbon-Montpensier, 1st Duke of Châtellerault (d. 1592)
- Henri de Bourbon-Montpensier, 2nd Duke of Châtellerault (1573–1608)
- Marie de Bourbon-Montpensier, 3rd Duchess of Châtellerault (1605–1627)
- Anne Louise d'Orléans, 4th Duchess of Châtellerault (1627–1693)

The title was then used by the House of Orléans.

== Dukes of Châtellerault, eighth creation (1730) ==
- Anne-Charles-Frédéric de La Trémoille, 1st Duke of Châtellerault (1711–1759)

== Dukes of Châtellerault, fifth creation, revived (1864) ==
- William Alexander Louis Stephen Douglas-Hamilton, 2nd Duke of Châtellerault (1845–1895), 12th Duke of Hamilton

For further succession, see Duke of Abercorn.
