= Louis, Count of Montpensier =

Louis, Count of Montpensier may refer to:

- Louis I, Count of Montpensier (1405–1486)
- Louis II, Count of Montpensier (1483–1501)
