= Louis II, Count of Montpensier =

French prince and soldier (1483–1501)

Louis de Bourbon
- Count of Montpensier
- Born: 1483
- Died: 14 August 1501 (aged 17–18)
- House: Bourbon-Montpensier
- Father: Gilbert de Bourbon, comte de Montpensier
- Mother: Clara Gonzaga

Louis II (1483 – 14 August 1501), count of Montpensier, was a French prince of the blood (prince du sang) and military commander during the early Italian Wars of the French king Louis XII. The eldest son of Gilbert of Bourbon and Clara Gonzaga, Louis inherited the County of Montpensier upon the death of his father in 1496. At the advent of Louis XII's reign in 1498, Montpensier involved himself in a dispute with the senior branch of the Bourbon's over their right to transmit the inheritance of their lands to a female heir, Suzanne. Despite this dispute, Suzanne's mother, Anne, duchess of Bourbon, looked to marry Suzanne to Montpensier, though his early death in 1501 precluded this possibility.

Following on from a French agreement with the kingdom of Aragon in 1500, Montpensier was involved in the French invasion of the kingdom of Naples in July 1501. He played a role in the capture and sack of Capua, the brutality of which would earn it an infamous reputation in the history of the Italian Wars. After a very short campaign, the French secured Naples. Montpensier died of the plague on 14 August only a few weeks later.

== Early life and family ==
Louis was born in 1483, the son of Gilbert, Count of Montpensier, and Clara Gonzaga, who had married two years prior in 1481. His father was established as viceroy and grand justiciar of the French-held Kingdom of Naples in 1495, before dying in October 1496 of the plague after having been driven out of the capital of the kingdom by King Frederick of Naples. His mother, Clara, was the daughter of Federico I Gonzaga, marquis of Mantua. His mother died in 1503.

Louis was the eldest son of the couple. He had two younger brothers: Charles and François. Louis also had a sister, Louise, who married the prince de La Roche-sur-Yon, founding the second house of Bourbon-Montpensier after the extinction of the Bourbon-Montpensier male line in 1527.

Around Louis' birth, there were five main cadet branches of the French royal line. The Valois-Orléans, the Valois-Angoulême, the Valois-Alençon, the Bourbon, the Bourbon-Montpensier and the Bourbon-Vendôme. The most senior cadet line would become the royal line after the extinction of the Valois dynasty proper in 1498, with the duc d'Orléans' ascent to the French throne as Louis XII. The Bourbon-Montpensier branch, of which Louis de Bourbon was a member, held the comté de Montpensier (county of Montpensier) and the fr:dauphiné d'Auvergne.

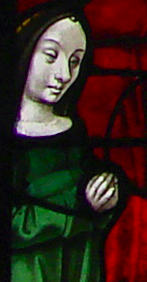
Bourbon heiress Suzanne de Bourbon whose mother wished to see her married to Montpensier

With Montpensier opposing the rights of the duc de Bourbon and duchesse de Bourbon to dispose of their lands to their daughter Suzanne, the family betrothed their daughter to the scion of the Valois-Alençon family, the duc d'Alençon, in the presence of Louis XII at Moulins in 1500 or 1501 (Crouzet says the former, David-Chapy the latter), according to Crouzet this was a form of retaliation against the head of the house of Bourbon-Montpensier for his attempts to frustrate their succession plans. The historian David-Chapy diverges from Crouzet's interpretation, arguing that the duc de Bourbon's favour towards the Alençon match derived from strategic considerations.

Unlike her husband, the duchesse de Bourbon wished to see her daughter married to the comte de Montpensier. David-Chapy highlights that this latter match was a far more threatening prospect for the French king Louis, as it would consolidate a large swath of territory in the core of the kingdom. In contrast, the territories of Alençon and Bourbon were far removed from one another. It was for this very reason that the duchesse desired to see her daughter wed to the comte de Montpensier, through whom the strength of the house of Bourbon could be ensured. The historian suggests she may have also had distaste for the rebellious history of the house of Valois-Alençon. The prospect of a match with the comte de Montpensier was sunk by the death of the prince in August 1501. Her focus therefore shifted to his younger brother, Charles de Bourbon. With the death of the duc de Bourbon in 1503, the duchesse would see her plan realised, with the annulment of the betrothal to Alençon and later wedding of Charles de Bourbon and Suzanne on 10 May 1505.

== Bourbon inheritance ==
Upon the accession of Louis XII in May 1498, the king voided all prior arrangements made that suggested the duc de Bourbon's (duke of Bourbon's) lands might return to the crown for want of a male heir to his house. His daughter, Suzanne, would be permitted to inherit all the houses domains and pass them on to her children. Montpensier was in opposition to this measure of the kings, and tried to oppose the registration of the act in the parlement (the highest sovereign court of France).

That same year, Montpensier launched a claim against the senior branch of the house of Bourbon, in which he argued that he was their rightful heir, as opposed to their daughter Suzanne. The duc and duchesse de Bourbon rejected his claim, and therefore Montpensier brought it before the parlement. To the end of this suit, he appeared before the body on 3 December 1498. In his appearance before the parlement he declared that engaging in a legal fight with the duc de Bourbon was something that set him ill at ease. Indeed, he considered himself a humble servant of the duc and duchesse de Bourbon. Nevertheless, he felt it was necessary for the sake of his house and he could not allow the matter to go unresolved as it would be a dereliction of his posterity. He compared himself to the Biblical figure of Naboth, who had defended the vineyard of his ancestors against the rapacious Jezebel and Ahab.

== Italian affairs ==
=== Mantua ===
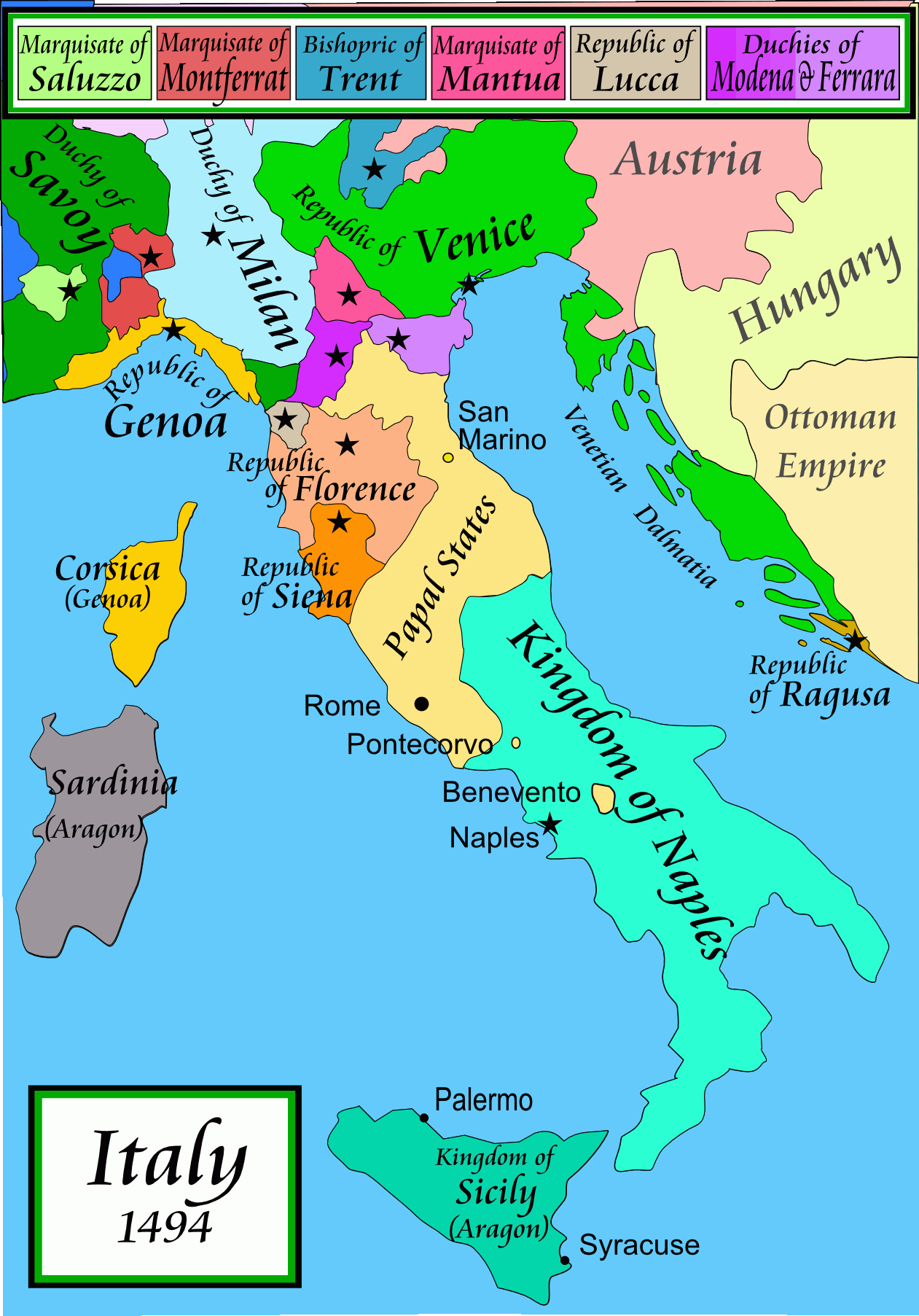
Italian peninsula at the beginning of the Italian Wars in 1494

On 1 October 1500, Montpensier made a request of the marquis of Mantua, his maternal uncle, begging him to release the poet de Nesson from his captivity. The historian Vissière speculates that Nesson may have been involved with a brief plot by Montpensier to seize the marquisate of Mantua in the summer of 1500.

=== Naples ===
With a new French invasion of Naples in the air, the pro-French barons of the kingdom of Naples undertook a wave of rebellions against the crown, which would soon facilitate Louis XII's reconquest of the kingdom.

Per the terms of the 10 October 1500 treaty of Chambord and then 11 November treaty of Granada, Naples was carved up between the French king Louis and the Aragonese king Ferdinand II. Louis was granted the title of king of Naples, the eponymous city and the provinces of Terra di Lavoro and Abruzzo. Ferdinand was granted the title of duke, and the provinces of Calabria and Apulia.

It is likely this deal was not intended to be a permanent one, the arrangements making no mention of the provinces of Capitanata and Basilicata and involving complicated mandate for the equal share of royal revenues.

This secret arrangement was revealed to the world long before the issue of the Papal bull (an official Papal decree) of Pope Alexander VI which was proclaimed on 25 June 1501. This Bull stated that the king of Naples, Federigo, was deposed, and the French and Aragonese sovereigns were invested with their respective titles and territories. By this time, French soldiers were already in Rome.

The French army that was to conquer Naples had departed Milan in June 1501. It was under the command of the seigneur d'Aubigny (lord of Aubigny) and according to Shaw contained around 1,000 lances (the squads that supported a man-at-arms) and 7,000 infantry, much of which was French. The historian Pellegrini by contrast suggests the army contained 10,000 infantry and 5,000 cavalry. There was also a supplementary force under the seigneur de Ravenstien which was to head to Naples by sea from Toulon.

In early July, the Spanish commander Gonzalo de Córdoba landed unopposed in Calabria to secure the territories allotted to the Aragonese. The king of Naples, Federigo II, had concentrated his forces in the north of his kingdom.

Federigo had attempted to raise forces through a summons to his barons to perform military service. This method of service was ill used, last having seen employment in the fourteenth century, and Federigo was only able to count on around 6,000 infantry, 700 men-at-arms and 500 light horse. Among those who had rallied to him were two members of the Roman Colonna family, Fabrizio Colonna and Prospero Colonna. Federigo charged the former with the defence of Capua which he was to guard with a large portion of the Napoli army, including some forces Fabrizio had brought down from the Papal States.

The French campaign into Naples followed in the model of the campaign in Lombardy. The first conquered cities were to be subjected to brutal treatment. They were sacked, burned and the population massacred. On 14 July, the French took Aversa before moving on to Capua. The nearby town of Marigliano had its whole garrison, numbering several hundred, hanged for 'rebellion' some time in July.

At Capua, first the outer bastions were met by the French artillery, which duelled with the Neapolitan artillery. After four days, these were overcome and the garrisons slaughtered. Putting the city of Capua to siege on 24 or 25 July the French met little resistance. A breach was soon made, and while surrender negotiations were being undertaken (the population keen to avoid a sack), French forces poured through the breach and began to sack the city. With the Sicilian army routing, the greenlight was given to massacre and pillage. Between several hundred and several thousand died in the sack. Shaw describes it as one of the "most horrific episodes of the Italian Wars". The commander Fabrizio Colonna was among those taken prisoner, with a hefty ransom attached to his release. After two days in Capua, the army made to move on to Naples.

In the contemporary history of Guillaume de Marillac, which always found a place for the aggrandisement of the house of Bourbon, the comte de Montpensier received a glowing role as related to the siege of Capua. He is supposed to have commended himself by his conduct during the siege. Indeed, Marillac records the French king as saying that he possessed the kingdom Naples thanks to the efforts of Montpensier.

As the French army marched on the city of Naples, Federigo II saw the writing on the wall. He ordered his various garrisons that still held out to come to terms with the French. In return for this concession he hoped to be granted permission to retire to the island of Ischia with his men. The French commander, the seigneur d'Aubigny consented to this arrangement. Federico was to be afforded safe conduct under condition he surrender to Louis within six months. The city of Naples, bribed the French army with 60,000 ducats to avoid suffering a sack as had Capua.

On 28 July, according to Le Fur, the French army entered Naples, completing a process of conquest that had taken less than two months. Shaw holds the timeline a little differently, stating that the garrison of the fortress of Castelnuovo surrendered to the French on 2 August, and that the commander d'Aubigny entered Naples after this. An outbreak of cholera quickly soured the victory. Among those it killed were the sénéchal de Beaucaire and the comte de Montpensier.

The comte de Montpensier died on 14 August 1501, of a fever he had caught while holding a service for his late father.

From Naples, the bodies of the comte de Montpensier, and his father, were embalmed, and transferred to the chapel of Saint-Louis in Aigueperse.

With his death, his younger brother Charles succeeded to head of the Bourbon-Montpensier branch of the Bourbon family. Of the eighty to a hundred thousand livres of income the Bourbon enjoyed, Montpensier only willed eight thousand livres of rentes to Charles. He was replaced in Italy by the duc de Nemours.

== Reputation ==
According to the historian Crouzet, Montpensier was nicknamed the 'plus grand menteur de France' (greatest liar in France).

== Sources ==
- Crouzet, Denis (2003). Charles de Bourbon: Connétable de France. Fayard.
- David-Chapy, Aubrée (2022). Anne de France: Gouverner au Féminin à la Renaissance. Passés Composés.
- Dupont-Pierrart, Nicole (2017). Claire de Gonzague Comtesse de Bourbon-Montpensier (1464-1503): Une Princesse Italienne à la Cour de France. Presses Universitaires du Septentrion.
- Hamon, Philippe (2021a). "MONTPENSIER, Gilbert de (vers 1443 ? - Pouzzoles, 9 novembre 1496)". In Jouanna, Arlette; Hamon, Philippe; Biloghi, Dominique; Le Thiec, Guy (eds.). La France de La Renaissance: Histoire et Dictionnaire. Bouquins.
- Hamon, Philippe (2021b). "BOURBON, Charles de, connétable (?, 17 février 1490 - Rome, 6 mai 1527)". In Jouanna, Arlette; Hamon, Philippe; Biloghi, Dominique; Le Thiec, Guy (eds.). La France de La Renaissance: Histoire et Dictionnaire. Bouquins.
- Jouanna, Arlette (2009). La France de La Renaissance. Éditions Perrin.
- Jouanna, Arlette (2021a). "BOURBON, maison de". In Jouanna, Arlette; Hamon, Philippe; Biloghi, Dominique; Le Thiec, Guy (eds.). La France de La Renaissance: Histoire et Dictionnaire. Bouquins.
- Jouanna, Arlette (2021b). "Le Temps de la Renaissance en France (vers 1470-1559)". In Jouanna, Arlette; Hamon, Philippe; Biloghi, Dominique; Le Thiec, Guy (eds.). La France de La Renaissance: Histoire et Dictionnaire. Bouquins.
- Le Fur, Didier (2001). Louis XII: Un Autre César. Éditions Perrin.
- Le Roux, Nicolas (2015). Le Crépuscule de la Chevalerie: Noblesse et Guerre au Siècle de la Renaissance. Champ Vallon.
- Mallett, Michael; Shaw, Christine (2019). The Italian Wars 1494-1559: War, State and Society in Early Modern Europe. Routledge.
- Pellegrini, Marco (2017). Le Guerre d'Italia 1494-1559. Società Editrice il Mulino.
- Quilliet, Bernard (1986). Louis XII: Père du Peuple. Fayard.
- Quilliet, Bernard (1998). La France du Beau XVIe Siècle. Fayard.
- Vissière, Laurent (2000). Louis II de La Trémoille ou la Découverte de L'Italie (1480-1525). École Nationale des Chartes.
- Vissière, Laurent (2008). Sans Poinct Sortir horse de l'Orniere: Louis II de La Trémoille (1460-1525). Honoré Champion.

Preceded by Gilbert	Count of Clermont-en-Auvergne and Montpensier; Dauphin d'Auvergne; 1496–1501	Succeeded by Charles
