= House of Bourbon-Montpensier =

Semi-royal family

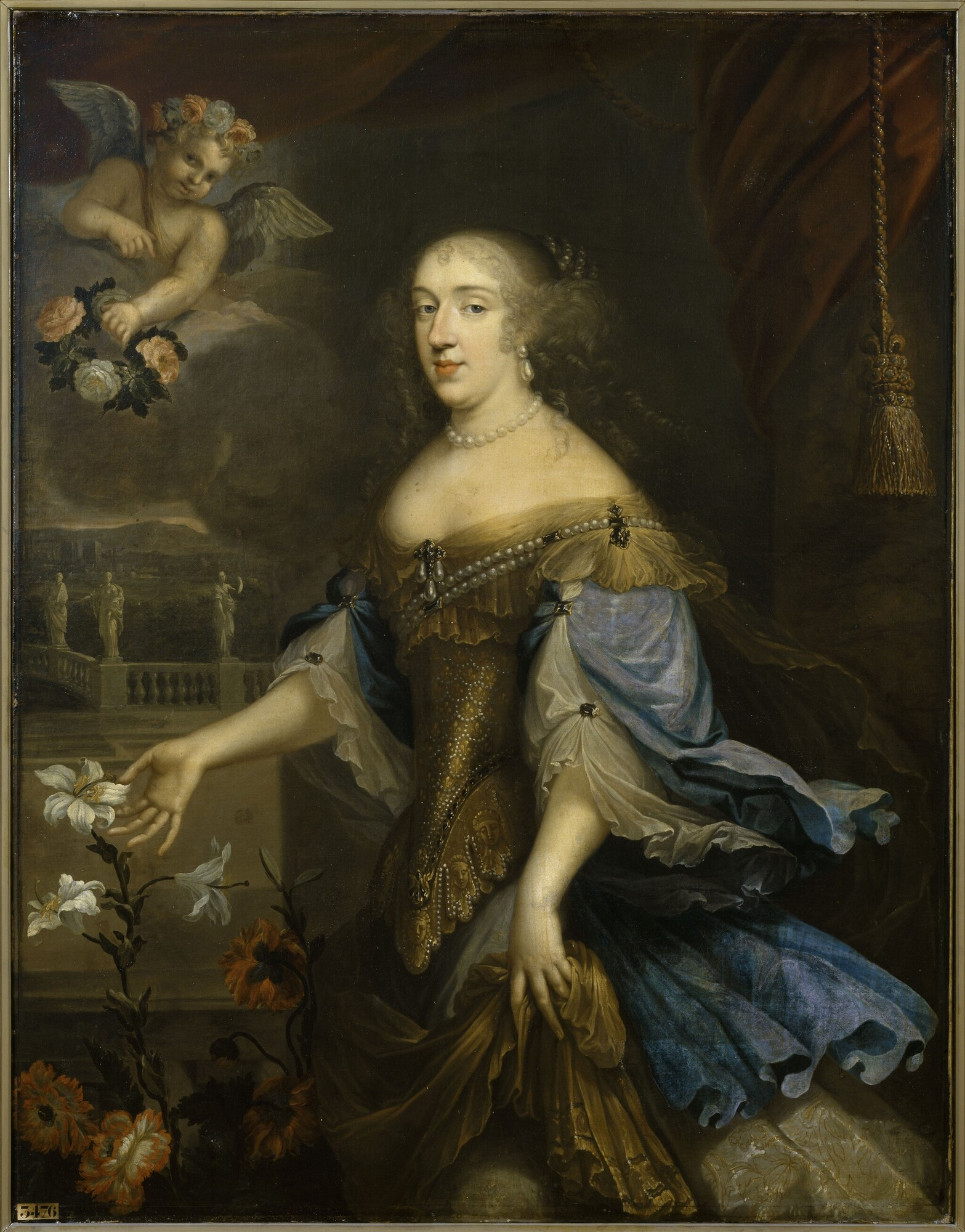
La Grande Mademoiselle was the last of the official line of the House of Bourbon-Montpensier. She held the title in her own right as it was from her mother. It went to the wife of her cousin Elizabeth Charlotte, Princess Palatine.

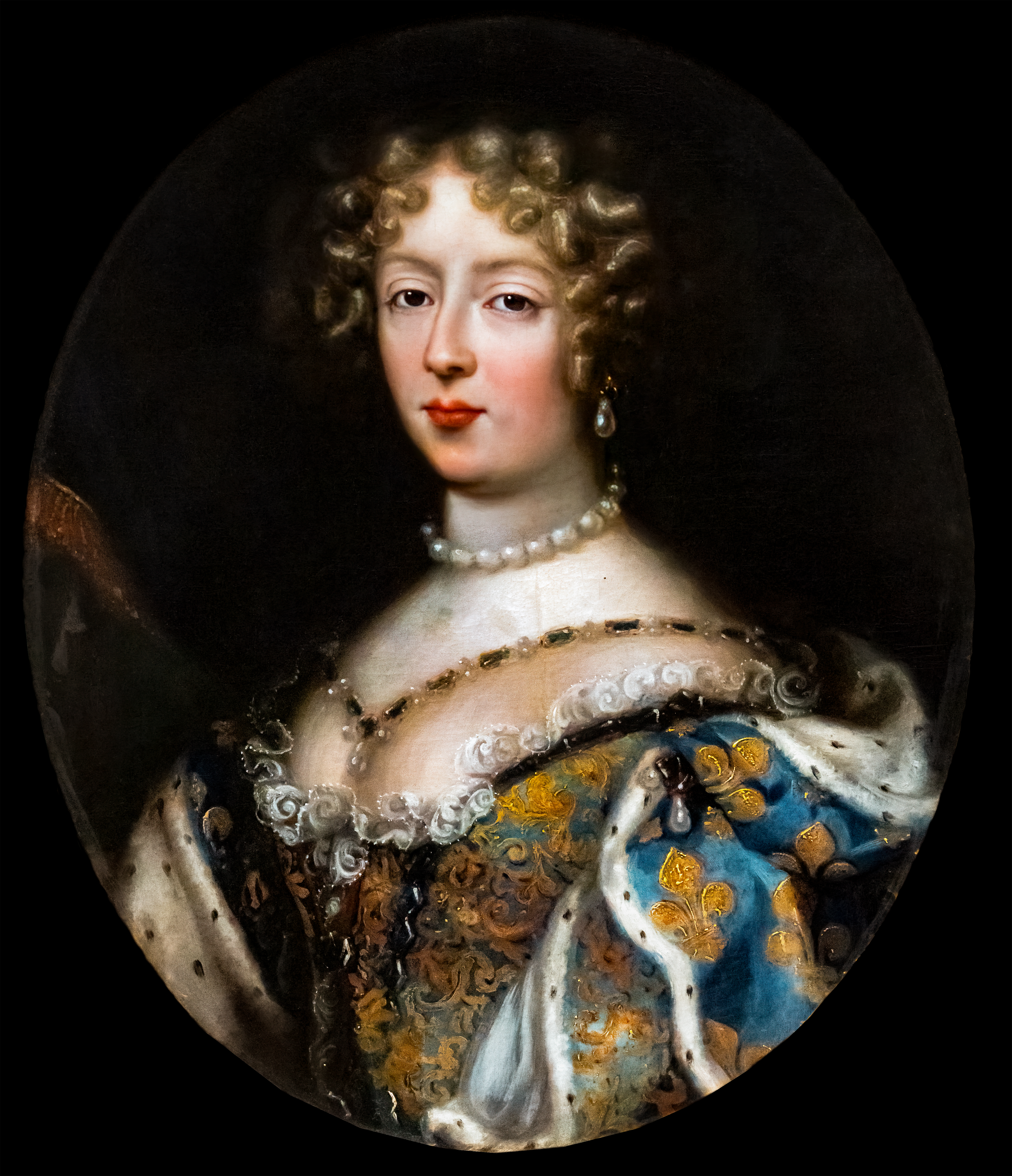
Elizabeth Charlotte, Princess Palatine, the wife of Philippe de France duc d'Orléans duc de Montpensier

The House of Bourbon-Montpensier or Maison de Bourbon-Montpensier was a semi-royal family. The first part, Bourbon, comes from the marriage of Marie de Valois, comtesse de Montpensier (1375–1434) and Jean de Bourbon, duc de Bourbon. The second part, Montpensier, comes from the title of the family.

The Bourbon-Montpensier family were the founders of the vast wealth that would later be enjoyed by the House of Orléans and their cousins the Bourbon-Penthièvres.

== History ==
The main line was founded by a marriage between John I, Duke of Bourbon and Marie de Valois, comtesse de Montpensier. The title was transferred down the line, mainly by females. The most famous examples of holders of the title of duc de Montpensier were:

1. Anne Marie Louise d'Orléans, duchesse de Montpensier (La Grande Mademoiselle)
2. Philippe II d'Orléans, duc d'Orléans, duc de Montpensier
3. Louis Philippe II d'Orléans, duc d'Orléans, duc de Montpensier

This semi-royal house was in existence for just over two centuries.

== Counts of Montpensier (1384) ==
1. Charles de Valois, comte de Montpensier (1362–1382) - son of John de Valois, duc de Berry and Auvergne
2. John of Valois, Count of Montpensier (1363–1401) - brother
3. Marie de Valois, comtesse de Montpensier (1375–1434) - sister of John; she married John I, Duke of Bourbon
4. Louis I de Bourbon, comte de Montpensier (1403–1486) - son
5. Gilbert de Bourbon, comte de Montpensier (1448–1496) - son of Louis I
6. Louis II de Bourbon, comte de Montpensier (1483–1501) - son of Gilbert
7. Charles III de Bourbon, comte de Montpensier (1490–1527) - brother of Louis II

== Dukes of Montpensier (1539) ==
=== House of Bourbon ===
1. Louise de Bourbon, duchesse de Montpensier (1482–1561) - sister of Charles III
2. Louis III de Bourbon, duc de Montpensier (1513–1582) - son of Louise
3. François de Bourbon, duc de Montpensier (1542–1592) - son of Louis
4. Henri de Bourbon, duc de Montpensier (1573–1608) - son of François
5. Marie de Bourbon, duchesse de Montpensier (1605–1627) - daughter of Henri
6. Anne Marie Louise d'Orléans, duchesse de Montpensier (La Grande Mademoiselle) (1627–1693) - daughter of Marie

=== House of Orléans ===
On the death of Anne, Duchess of Montpensier, many of her titles, lands and wealth went to the House of Orléans. Her cousin Philippe de France, duc d'Orléans was the founder of the modern House of Orléans and was her sole heir. As a result of this vast inheritance, the Orléans family became very wealthy. Their wealth only increased when the Bourbon-Penthièvre married into the family in 1769.

1. Philippe de France, duc d'Orléans, duc de Montpensier
2. Philippe II d'Orléans, duc d'Orléans, duc de Montpensier (1674-1723)
3. Louis d'Orléans, duc d'Orléans, duc de Montpensier (1703-1752) - son of Philippe
4. Louis Philippe I d'Orléans, duc d'Orléans, duc de Montpensier (1725-1785) - son of Louis
5. Louis Philippe Joseph d'Orléans, duc d'Orléans, duc de Montpensier (Philippe Égalité) (1747-1793) - son of Louis Philippe I
6. Louis Philippe III d'Orléans, King of the French, duc de Montpensier (1773-1850) - son of Louis Philippe Joseph

=== Post Louis-Philippe of France ===
1. Philippe d'Orléans, comte de Paris, duc de Montpensier (1838–1894) - grandson of Louis Philippe
2. Philippe d'Orléans, duc d'Orléans, duc de Montpensier (1869–1926) - son of Philippe
3. Jean d'Orléans, duc de Guise, duc d'Orléans, duc de Montpensier (1874–1940) - cousin of Philippe
4. Henri d'Orléans, comte de Paris, duc d'Orléans, duc de Montpensier (1908–1999) - son of Jean
5. Henri d'Orléans, comte de Paris, duc de France, duc de Montpensier (1933–2019) - son of Henri
6. Jean d'Orléans, comte de Paris, duc de France, duc de Montpensier (born 1965) - son of Henri

== Courtesy title ==
The title Duke of Montpensier has been used as a courtesy title by other members of the House of Orléans:

- Antoine Philippe d'Orléans, Duke of Montpensier (1775–1807) second son of Louis Philippe II, Duke of Orléans
- Antoine d'Orléans, Duke of Montpensier (1824–1890) youngest son of Louis Philippe, King of the French
- Marie-Thérèse of Württemberg, Duchess of Montpensier (born 1934), ex-wife of Prince Henri, Count of Paris, Duke of France

== Other titles ==
The arms of the House of Bourbon-Montpensier family

The arms of the Dauphin of Auvergne.

The arms of the Duchy of Montpensier

The arms of the Principality of Joinville

Before the title was given to the Orléans Family, the title was the main on used by the holder. By the time of the marriage of Marie de Bourbon, Duchess of Montpensier and a Prince du Sang, Gaston, Duke of Orléans, a whole collection of titles had been collected and used. These ones were:

- Dauphin of Auvergne
- Sovereign Prince of the Dombes' (Prince du Dombes)
- Lord of Châtellerault
- Duke of Montpensier
- Prince de Luc,
- Prince de la Roche-sur-Yon,
- Prince de Joinville
- Duc de Beaupréau
- Duc de Guise
- Duc de Saint-Fargeau
- Duc de Joyeuse
- Duc de Châtellerault
- Marquise de Méziere
- Comte d'Eu,
- Comte de Mortain
- Comte de Bar-sur-Seine
- vicomte d'Auge
- Vicomte de Brosse,
- Baron de Beaujolais,
- Lord de Champigny-sur-Veude

Note:Most of the titles were used in their feminine forms because most of the holders of the titles were women.

== After Anne Marie Louise d'Orléans ==
On the death of Marie de Bourbon, duchesse de Montpensier in 1627, less than a month after the birth of her daughter Anne Marie Louise d'Orléans, duchesse de Montpensier the family wealth had grown astonishingly. After her mother's death, Anne became the heiress to one of the largest fortunes in, probably, Europe.

Unfortunately she died with no heirs. Even though she could have been Queen of various countries, she was happy being a Princesse du Sang in France and having her various residences at her disposal. She died in 1693 and most of her fortune went to her other royal cousin Philippe de France, duc d'Orléans. Even though some of her titles had gone to Louis-Auguste de Bourbon, the founder of the illegitimate line of Bourbon du Maine, as a result of a scam by his mother Françoise-Athénaïs, marquise de Montespan.

Her vast wealth helped to found the House of Orléans and then the Bourbon-Penthièvre family financially. The latter getting most of it through the death and inheritances from their cousins the du Maines. They went on to be absorbed by the House of Orléans via a marriage and no male heirs.

=== House of Orléans ===
On the death of Anne Marie Louise d'Orléans, the title was used exclusively by the main members on the house. The first person to hold the title of duc de Montpensier was Philippe de France and the title is often said to have been inherited by his wife Elizabeth Charlotte, Princess Palatine, duchesse d'Orléans. Even so, she did not hold the title in her own right but as the wife of the duke of Montpensier.

The title passed down the line of the Orléans family and is now used as a courtesy title by the pretender to the Throne of the Orléans family.

== See also ==
- House of Bourbon
