= Anne of France =

Duchess of Bourbon (1461–1522)

- Duchess of Bourbon
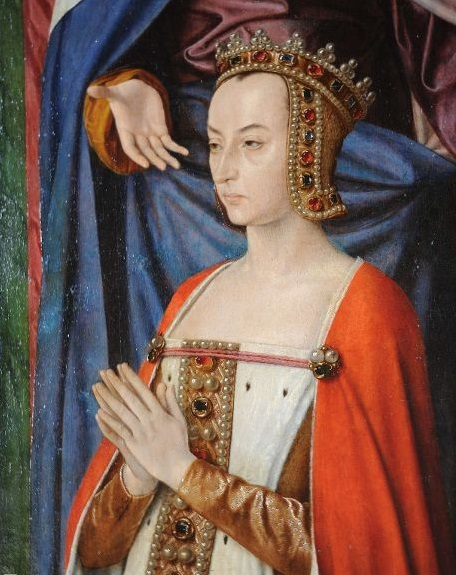
- Detail of Anne from The Moulins Triptych by Jean Hey, c. 1498

Regent of France
- Regency: 1483–1491
- Monarch: Charles VIII
- Co-Regent: Peter II, Duke of Bourbon
- Born: 3 April 1461; Chateau of Genappe, Brabant
- Died: 14 November 1522 (aged 61); Chateau of Chantelle, Bourbonnais, Allier, France
- Burial: Priory of Souvigny
- Spouse: Peter II, Duke of Bourbon (m. 1473; died 1503)
- Issue: Charles, Count of Clermont; Suzanne, Duchess of Bourbon
Names
- Anne de Beaujeu
- House: Valois
- Father: Louis XI
- Mother: Charlotte of Savoy

Anne of France (or Anne de Beaujeu; 3 April 1461 – 14 November 1522) was a French princess and regent, the eldest daughter of Louis XI by Charlotte of Savoy. Anne was the sister of Charles VIII, for whom she acted as regent during his minority from 1483 until 1491. During the regency she was one of the most powerful women of late fifteenth-century Europe, and was referred to as "Madame la Grande" (lit. 'the Great Lady'). Between 1503 and 1521, she also acted as de facto regent of the Duchy of Bourbon during the reign of her daughter Suzanne, Duchess of Bourbon.

== Early life ==
Anne was born at the Chateau of Genappe in Brabant on 3 April 1461, the eldest surviving daughter of King Louis XI of France and Charlotte of Savoy. Her brother, Charles would later succeed their father as Charles VIII of France. Her younger sister Joan of France, Duchess of Berry, became queen consort of France as the first wife of Louis XII for a brief period.

== Marriage ==
Anne's Coat-of-Arms

Anne was originally betrothed to Nicholas, Duke of Lorraine, and was created Viscountess of Thouars in 1468 in anticipation of the marriage. However, Nicholas broke the engagement to instead pursue Mary of Burgundy, and then died unexpectedly in 1473, prompting Louis to take back the fiefdom. That same year, on 3 November, Anne married Peter of Bourbon instead, and took up rule of the Beaujolais at the same time, when her husband was ceded the title of 'Lord of Beaujeu' by his brother the Duke of Bourbon. Anne was just twelve years old at the time.

== Regency in France ==
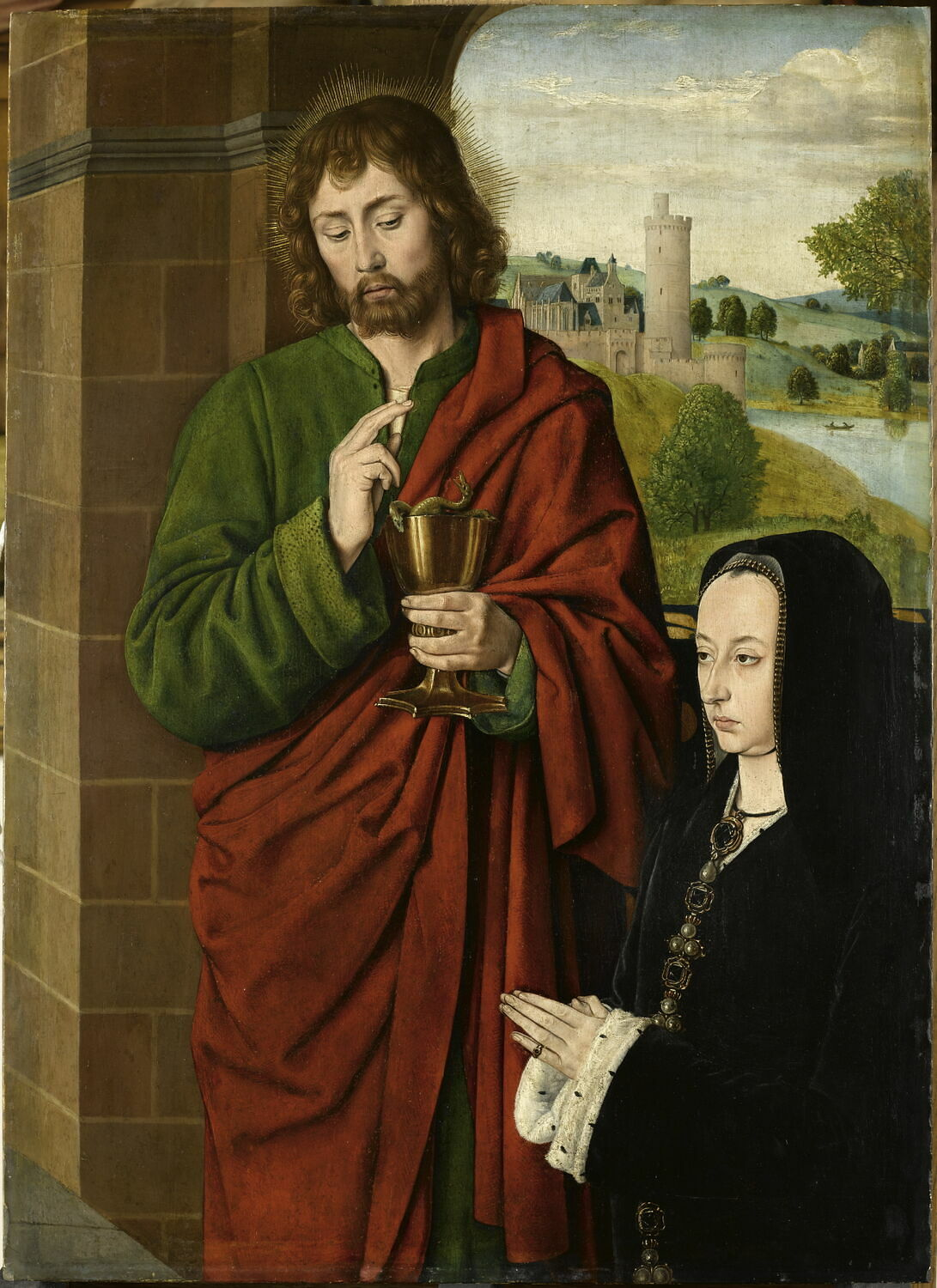
Depiction of Anne and St. John the Evangelist

During the minority of Anne's brother, Charles VIII of France, Peter and Anne held the regency of France. This regency lasted from 1483 until 1491. Anne's regency overcame many difficulties, including unrest amongst the magnates who had suffered under Louis XI's oppression. Together Peter and Anne maintained the royal authority and the unity of the kingdom against the Orléans party, which was in open revolt during the "Mad War", which lasted from 1483 until 1488.

Concessions, many of which sacrificed Louis's favourites, were made, and land was restored to many of the hostile nobles, including the future Louis XII, then Duke of Orléans. Louis tried to obtain the regency, but the Estates General sided with her.

As regent of France, Anne was one of the most powerful women in the late fifteenth century, and she was referred to as "Madame la Grande" (lit. 'the Great Lady'). In addition to having a strong, formidable personality, Anne was extremely intelligent, shrewd and energetic. Her father had termed her "the least foolish woman in France". Anne was dark-haired with a high forehead, a widow's peak, and finely-arched eyebrows. She was further described as having had clear brown eyes, direct in their gaze; a sharp, haughty nose, thin lips, thin hands, and she "stood straight as a lance".

Anne was responsible for housing and educating many of the aristocracy's children, including Diane de Poitiers and Louise of Savoy. She is credited with instructing these young people with the new "refined" manners such as not using their fingers to wipe their noses but with a "piece of fabric". Louise of Savoy would act as regent several times when her son Francis was king. By being raised by Anne, she was able to learn about France and its governance from up close. Anne also oversaw the tutelage of Margaret of Austria, who had been intended as a bride for Anne's brother Charles. Margaret would later become Governor of the Habsburg Netherlands.

She gave her support to Henry Tudor against his rival, King Richard III of England, when he sought her aid to oust Richard. Anne supplied him with French troops for the 1485 invasion which culminated at the Battle of Bosworth on 22 August, where Henry emerged the victor, ascending the throne as Henry VII.

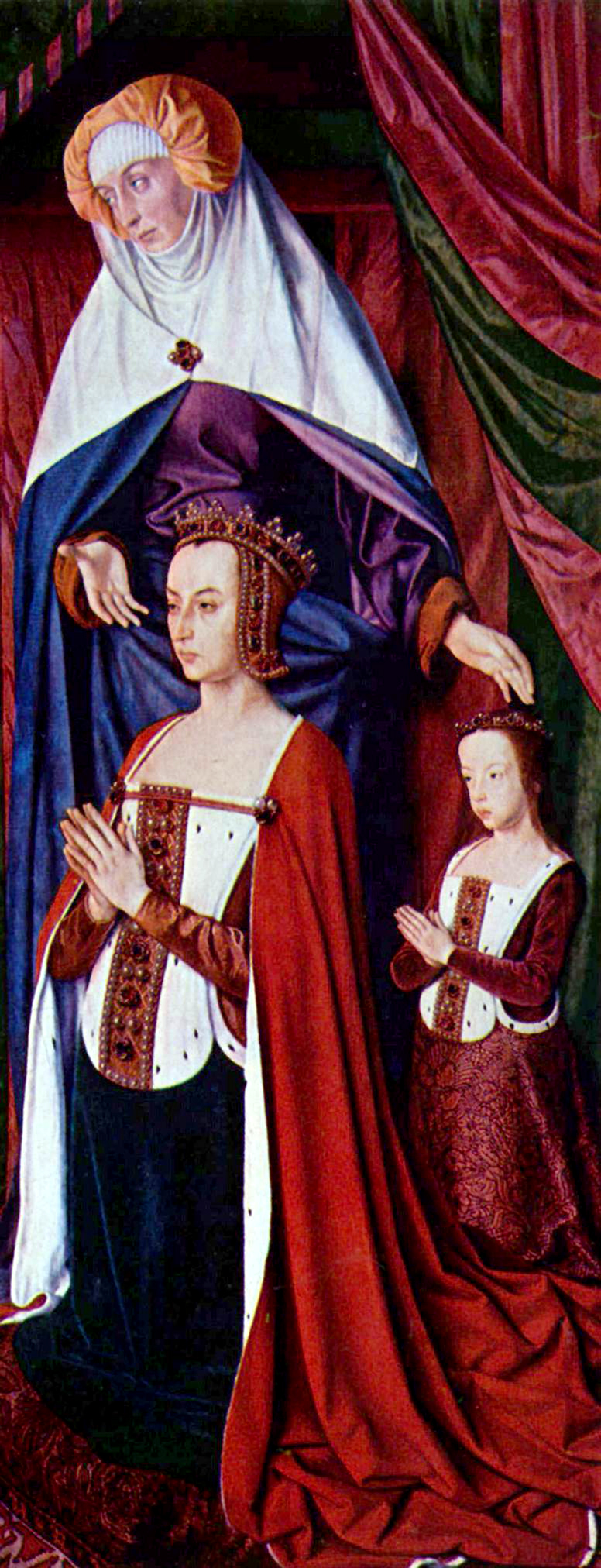
Triptych which depicts St. Anne presenting Anne and her daughter Suzanne

Anne made the final treaty ending the Hundred Years' War, the Treaty of Etaples and, in 1491 (despite Austrian and English opposition), arranged the marriage of her brother Charles to Anne, Duchess of Brittany, in order to annex Brittany to the French crown. When Charles ended the regency in 1491, both Anne and Peter fell victim to the wrath of the new queen, whose duchy's independence had been compromised.

Anne secured her husband's inheritance of the Duchy of Bourbon after his brother by having his nephew declared illegitimate. This was in opposition to both her father's and her own previous policy of royal centralism against feudal autonomy. The reason is theorized to have been her own wish to secure a personal domain for herself and her daughter because her brother the king was twenty and she realized he would not accept her guardianship over him much longer.

Her position as regent of France was gradually phased out during the events of 1491–92. On 28 June 1491 the Duke of Orleans was welcome back to court and reconciled with the king; on 6 December the king's wedding was conducted; and on 5 July 1492, finally, the king and queen, the duke of Orleans and Anne and her spouse made a mutual oath to always love and protect each other. After the oath, Anne left with her spouse and daughter for the Duchy of Bourbon and thus her regency was ended.

== Regency in Bourbon ==
Anne and Peter produced only one surviving child, Suzanne, born 10 May 1491. Anne had an earlier pregnancy in 1476, but there were contradictory accounts about this: some said the baby was miscarried or stillborn, but others reported that a living son was born, Charles, styled Count of Clermont in 1488 as was customary for the heir of the Duchy of Bourbon, who died aged 22 in 1498 and was buried in the Abbey of Souvigny, Auvergne.

Suzanne succeeded Peter as suo jure Duchess of Bourbon on his death in 1503. Anne, however, had always been the more dominant member in her marriage and remained the administrator of the Bourbon lands after his death, protecting them from royal encroachment. She resided with her own court in Chantelle.

In 1505, Anne arranged for Suzanne to marry another Bourbon prince, Charles of Montpensier, who became Charles III, Duke of Bourbon.

Her daughter and son-in-law, however, failed to produce surviving offspring, and Suzanne predeceased her mother. When Anne herself died in 1522, her own line and that of her father became extinct. Anne of Laval, a descendant of Anne's aunt Yolande of Valois, was considered to be her heir.

== Writings ==
Anne wrote an instruction book for her daughter. It is called Lessons for My Daughter. In it, she advises her daughter to surround herself with frugal people and that true nobility comes from being humble, benign and courteous. Absent these, other virtues are worth nothing.

== In fiction ==
A highly fictitious account of her life and her supposed romance with Louis XII was written in 1947 by Muriel Roy Bolton called The Golden Porcupine. As it is a historical romance, the novel cannot be regarded as a biography. Anne also appears as a minor character in Michael Ennis' novel The Duchess of Milan. She plays a prominent role in a film, Louis XI, le pouvoir fracassé, about the last days of Louis XI.

She makes a fleeting appearance in Victor Hugo's Notre Dame de Paris: we are told that in December 1481, the Archdeacon of Josas, Claude Frollo, unsuccessfully attempts to block her visit to the cathedral cloister because she is a woman, then refuses to attend on her visit. The implication is that, since he is lusting after Esméralda, he fears losing control in the presence of another young woman to whom he is attracted.

In 2020, Rhiannon Drake portrayed Anne on the cast recording of A Mother's War, a musical based on the Wars of the Roses.

== Ancestry ==
Ancestors of Anne of France

Charles VI of France
Charles VII of France
Isabeau of Bavaria
Louis XI of France
Louis II, Duke of Anjou
Marie of Anjou
Yolande of Aragon
Anne of France
Antipope Felix V
Louis, Duke of Savoy
Mary of Burgundy
Charlotte of Savoy
Janus of Cyprus
Anne of Cyprus
Charlotte of Bourbon
