= Peter II, Duke of Bourbon =

French noble (1438–1503)

Peter II
- Duke of Bourbon
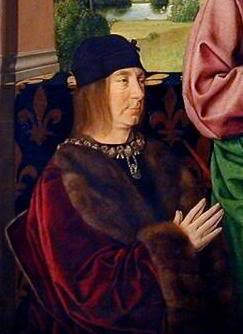
- A detail of a portrait of Peter II, presented by St. Peter, Louvre, oil on oak, 65x73 cm, 1492–1493, by Jean Hey

Regent of France
- Regency: 1483–1491
- Monarch: Charles VIII
- Co-Regent: Anne of France
- Born: 1 December 1438; Moulins
- Died: 10 October 1503 (aged 64)
- Spouse: Anne of France (m. 1473)
- Issue: Charles, Count of Clermont; Suzanne, Duchess of Bourbon
- House: Bourbon
- Father: Charles I, Duke of Bourbon
- Mother: Agnes of Burgundy

Peter II, Duke of Bourbon (1 December 1438 – 10 October 1503 in Moulins), was the son of Charles I, Duke of Bourbon, and Agnes of Burgundy, and a member of the House of Bourbon. He and his wife Anne of France ruled as regents during the minority of Charles VIII of France.

== Life, marriage, and royal favour ==
A loyal and capable subject of the crown, Peter earned the grudging respect of King Louis XI through his demonstration of the Bourbon family's "meekness and humility". Initially he was betrothed to Marie d'Orleans, sister of Louis, Duke of Orleans (the future Louis XII); Louis XI, who wanted to prevent such an alliance between two of the greatest feudal houses in France, broke the engagement, and took measures to bind both families closer to the crown.

A marriage between Peter and the King's elder daughter, Anne, was arranged (as was another marriage between Louis of Orleans and Anne's younger sister, Joan); as a mark of his favour, the King forced Peter's older brother John II, Duke of Bourbon to grant the Bourbon fief of Beaujeu (Beaujolais) to Peter, who was also given a seat on the royal council. Peter and Anne were married on 3 November 1473.

== Regent of France and Duke of Bourbon ==
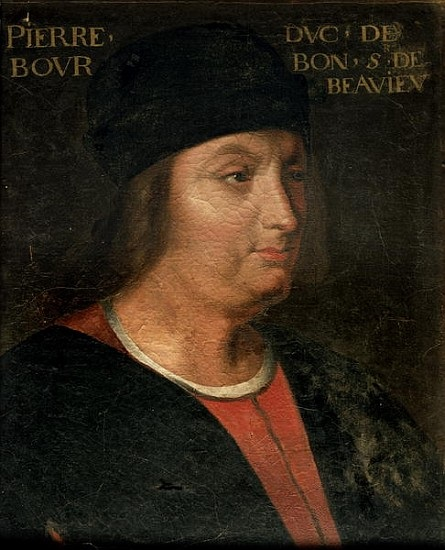
A 16th century portrait of Peter II, Duke of Bourbon from the Château de Beauregard.

Arms of Peter II, Duke of Bourbon

Arms of Peter as Lord of Beaujeu

At the time of Louis XI's death in 1483, Peter was one of the few royal servants to have remained consistently in favour during the King's reign, and it was to him that Louis, on his deathbed, granted guardianship over the new King, Charles VIII. Peter and his wife Anne immediately took up their duties, and began to position themselves as leaders of a regency government. The King was soon crowned, ending the need for a regency government. The thirteen-year-old king undertook personal rule of the kingdom, ostensibly on his own, but in reality guided by the Beaujeu couple.

Having assisted Anne in the governing of France, by 1488 Peter and his wife were building up a power base of their own in the Bourbonnais. Anne was already Countess of Gien, and Peter was Count of Clermont and La Marche, as well as Lord of Beaujeu; but the death of his eldest brother, John II, and the subsequent enforced renunciation of the family rights by his next eldest brother, Charles II, delivered the Bourbon inheritance (the Duchies of Bourbon and Auvergne, and the Counties of Forez and l'Isle-en-Jordain) into Peter's hands.

The new Duke and Duchess of Bourbon then proceeded to add to these domains, adding Bourbon-Lancy in December 1488, and trading l'Isle-en-Jordain with the Armagnacs in June 1489 for Murat and the viscountcy of Carlat. These domains were granted to them by the King in absolute right – they would not revert to the crown, and were not obligated to pass to the next heirs to the Bourbon inheritance, the Bourbon-Montpensiers – the Duke and Duchess could bequeath them to whomsoever they wished. On 10 May 1491, the pair finally acquired an heir of their own, a daughter, Suzanne (Anne had an earlier pregnancy in 1476, but about this existed contradictory accounts: some say the baby was miscarried or been stillborn, but others reported that a living son was born, Charles, styled Count of Clermont in 1488 as was customary for the heir of the Duchy of Bourbon, who died aged 22 in 1498 and was buried in the Abbey of Souvigny, Auvergne).

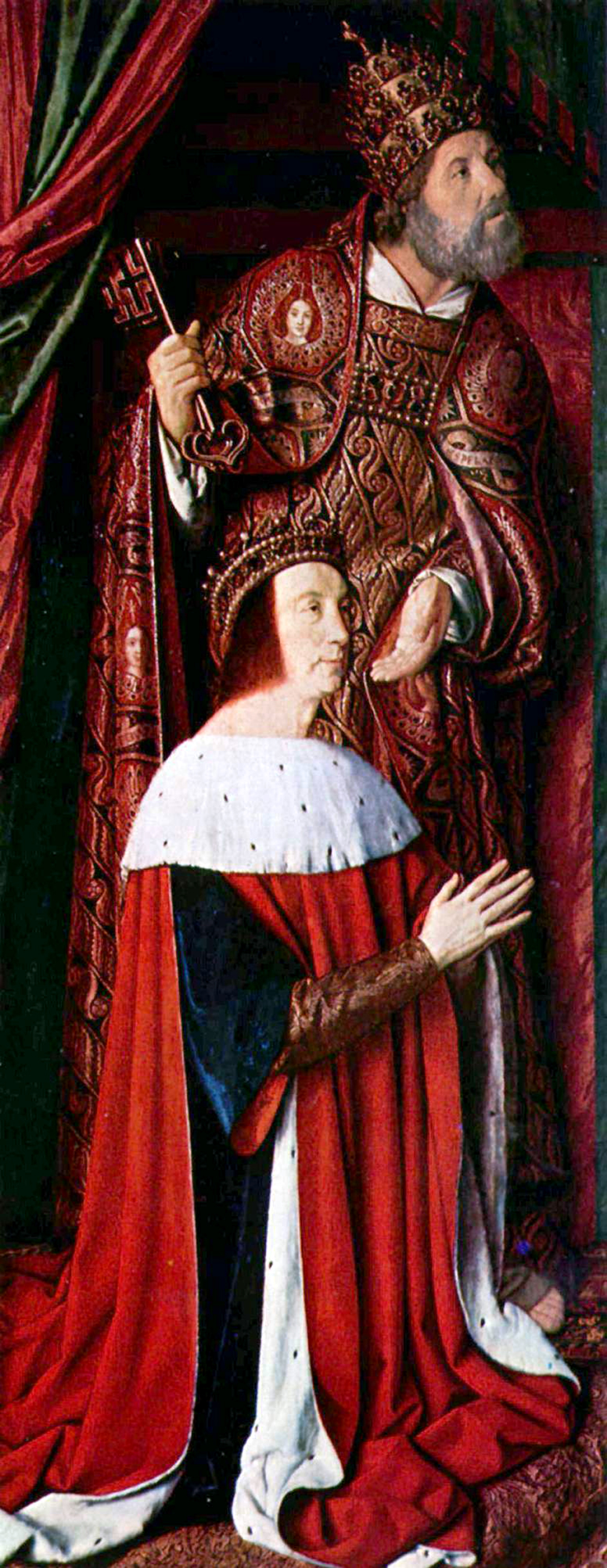
Peter II, Duke of Bourbon and regent of France, presented by Saint Peter

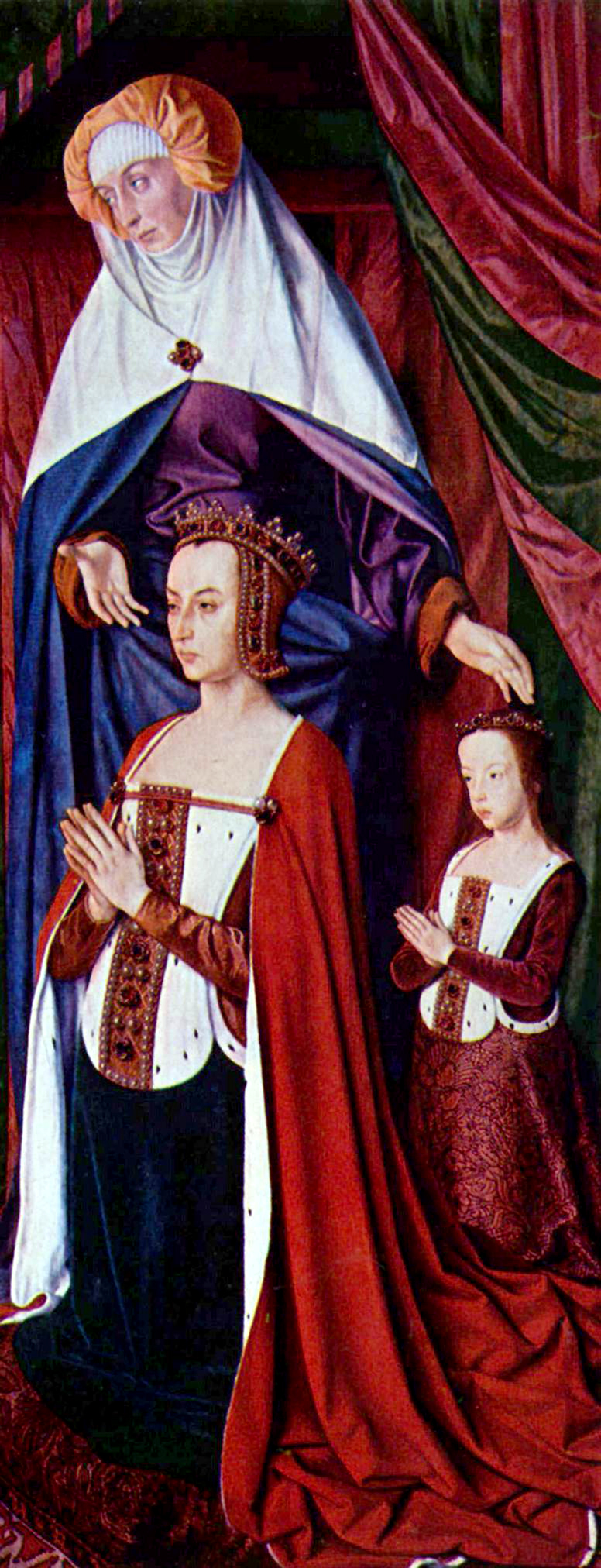
Anne of Beaujeu and her daughter Suzanne, the future Duchess of Bourbon, presented by St. Anne

Two details of the Moulins Triptych, painted by Jean Hey, depicting the Duke of Bourbon and his family

By 1491, the Bourbon influence over the crown was waning; Charles VIII was an adult now, unwilling to accept tutelage from his family. Against the better judgement of Anne and Peter, Charles chose to renounce his unconsummated marriage to Margaret of Austria, and instead marry Anne, Duchess of Brittany; he then went against them by returning Margaret's dowry – Artois and Franche-Comté – to her brother, Philip the Handsome. Nor were either able to prevent Charles' disastrous Italian expeditions, although both were left in control of France on several of his absences. Both continued to be major figures in the court for the rest of Charles VIII's reign, but restricted in power. After Charles VIII's death, and the accession of Louis XII, Peter largely retired from court politics and devoted his few remaining years to his family, being particularly devoted to his daughter Suzanne.

== Succession to the Duchy of Bourbon ==
Without surviving male issue, the next heir to the Bourbon Duchy was Suzanne. It was in the question of the future of Suzanne and the Bourbon territories that Peter and Anne found themselves opposing each another in his final years. With Charles VIII dead and the more cautious Louis XII on the throne, Suzanne needed a husband to support her in her inheritance, which risked being disputed by the crown and the Montpensiers. The Duke and Duchess had initially groomed the next Bourbon heir, Louis of Bourbon-Montpensier, as a son-in-law; but he mortally offended Peter by condemning letters patent of Louis XII which confirmed Suzanne's rights of inheritance (having been wrung from him as the price of Bourbon support upon his accession).

Peter then decided to betroth Suzanne to Charles IV, Duke of Alençon, a favourite of Louis XII, and so likely to protect the duchy against royal encroachment and Montpensier challenges. This contract was signed on 21 March 1501 at Moulins, Charles being 11, Suzanne 9. Before this marriage could be completed, however, Peter died of a fever. Following this, Anne arranged for Suzanne to marry the next Bourbon heir-male, Charles of Bourbon-Montpensier (Louis of Bourbon-Montpensier having died the year before), thereby averting a succession dispute over the Bourbon inheritance, which the young pair inherited jointly.

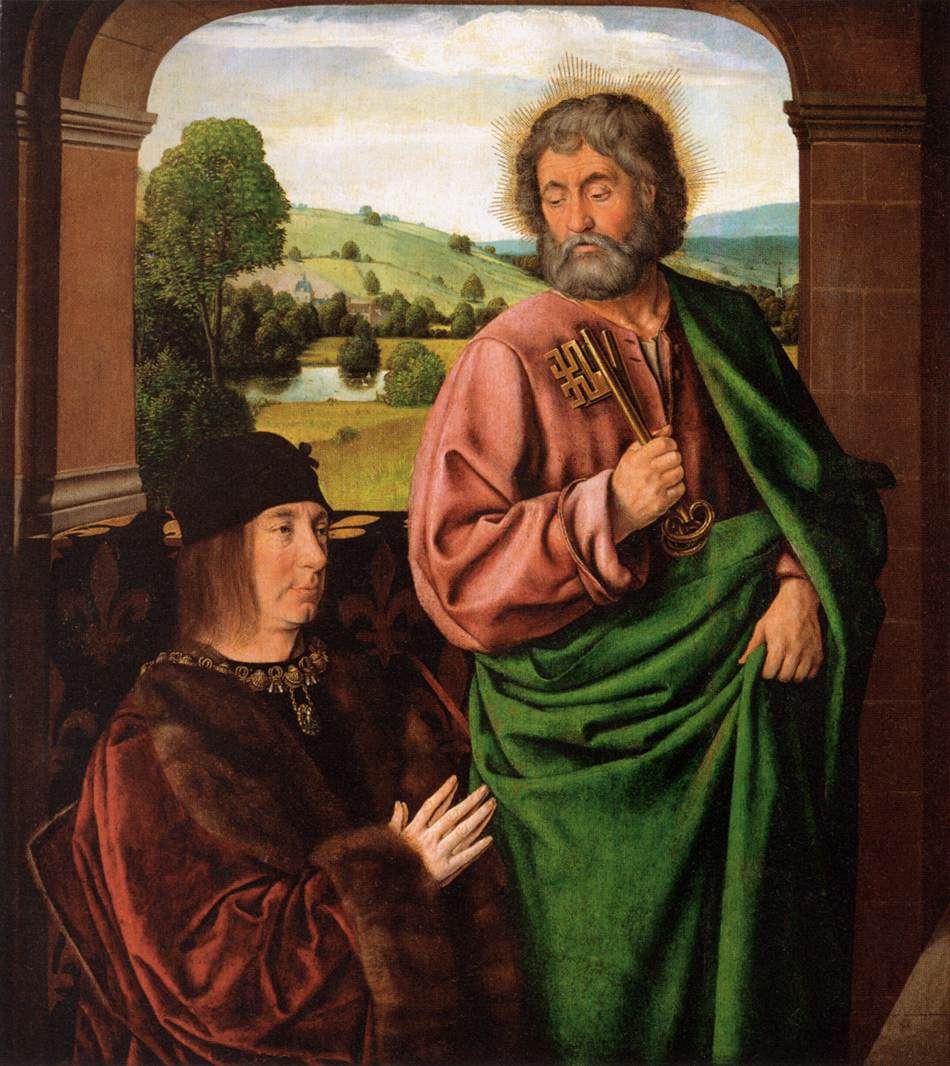
Pierre II, Duc de Bourbon, Presented by St Peter

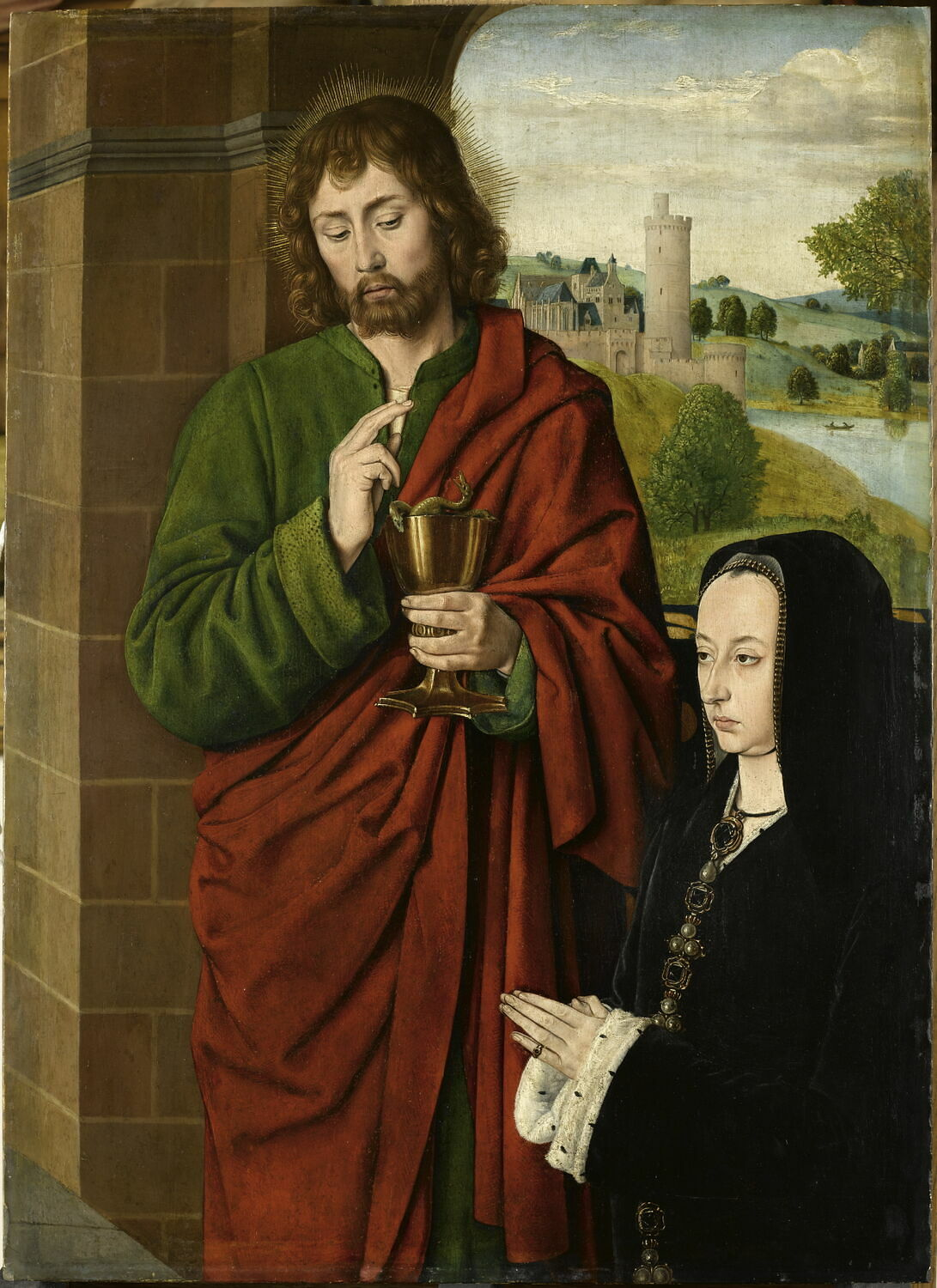
Anne of France, Duchesse de Bourbon, Presented by St John the Evangelist

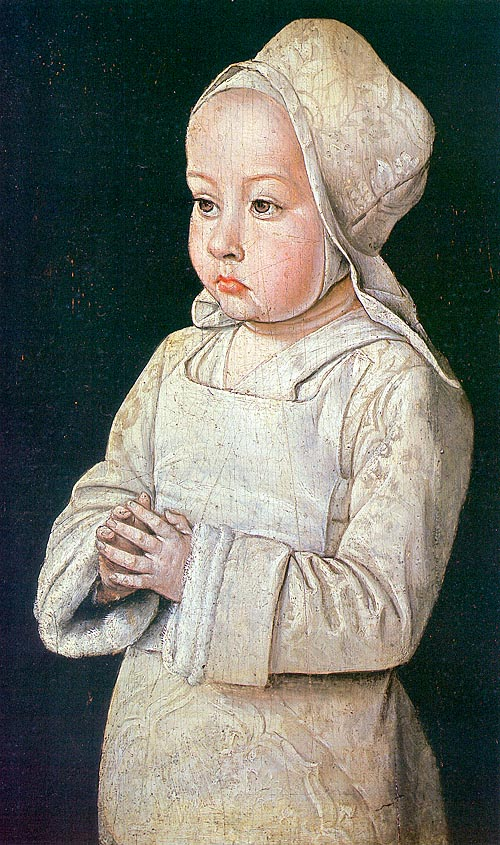
Suzanne Bourbon

== Ancestry ==
Family tree of Peter II, Duke of Bourbon

Louis II, Duke of Bourbon
John I, Duke of Bourbon
Anne of Auvergne
Charles I, Duke of Bourbon
John, Duke of Berry
Marie, Duchess of Auvergne
Joan of Armagnac
Peter II, Duke of Bourbon
Philip II, Duke of Burgundy
John I, Duke of Burgundy
Margaret III, Countess of Flanders
Agnes of Burgundy
Albert I, Duke of Bavaria
Margaret of Bavaria
Margaret of Brieg

Preceded by: —	Count of La Marche; 1477–1503	Succeeded by: Suzanne and Charles III
Preceded by: John II	Lord of Beaujeu and Count of Clermont-en-Beauvaisis; 1476–1503	Succeeded by: Suzanne and Charles III
Preceded by: Charles II	Duke of Auvergne and Bourbon; Count of Forez; 1488–1503	Succeeded by: Suzanne and Charles III
Preceded by: Charles II	Count of l'Isle-Jourdain; 1488–1489	Succeeded by: John of Armagnac
