= Duke of Bourbon =

French aristocratic title

Dukedom of Bourbon
- Coat of arms of the dukes from 1327 to 1410
- Creation date: 1327
- First holder: Louis I, Duke of Bourbon
- Present holder: Louis Alphonse de Bourbon

Duke of Bourbon (French: Duc de Bourbon) is a title in the peerage of France. It was created in the first half of the 14th century for the eldest son of Robert of France, Count of Clermont, and Beatrice of Burgundy, heiress of the lordship of Bourbon. In 1416, with the death of John of Valois, the Dukes of Bourbon were simultaneously Dukes of Auvergne.

Although the senior line came to an end in 1527, the cadet branch of La Marche-Vendome would later succeed to the French throne as the Royal House of Bourbon, which would later spread out to other kingdoms and duchies in Europe. After this date, the title was given to several Princes of Condé and sons of the French Royal family.

== Dukes of Bourbon ==
Arms of the dukes from 1410 to 1488

Arms of the dukes from 1488 to 1523

=== First creation: 1327–1523 – House of Bourbon ===
1. 1327–1341 : Louis I, Duke of Bourbon (1279–1341), the lame or the great, father of
2. 1341–1356 : Peter I, Duke of Bourbon (1311–1356), father of
3. 1356–1410 : Louis II, Duke of Bourbon (1337–1410), father of
4. 1410–1434 : John I, Duke of Bourbon (1381–1434), father of
5. 1434–1456 : Charles I, Duke of Bourbon (1401–1456), father of
6. 1456–1488 : John II, Duke of Bourbon (1426–1488), brother of
7. 1488–1488 : Charles II, Duke of Bourbon (1434–1488), Cardinal and Archbishop of Lyons, brother of
8. 1488–1503 : Peter II, Duke of Bourbon (1438–1503), father of
9. 1503–1521 : Suzanne, Duchess of Bourbon (1491–1521), wife of
10. 1505–1523 : Charles III, Duke of Bourbon (1490–1527), Count of Montpensier and Dauphin of Auvergne

For most of their history, the dukes of Bourbon were closely allied to their royal Valois cousins. This allowed them to maintain their rank with comparable prestige. They fought against the English in the Hundred Years' War, and took the side of the Armagnac faction during the Armagnac–Burgundian Civil War.

Peter II and his wife, Anne, daughter of Louis XI, had only one surviving child, Suzanne. They made her their heir through a concession from Louis XII. Anne, knowing that the Bourbon-Montpensier branch, the next senior branch of the Bourbon family, would pursue their claim, married her daughter to Charles, Count of Montpensier. Their marriage thus consolidated the vast possessions of the Bourbon family. The project, however, failed. Suzanne died childless, and the new king's mother, Louise of Savoy, claimed her inheritance, as heir by proximity of blood. Louise offered to marry the duke of Bourbon to settle the matter amicably. But Louise of Savoy was already 45 years old, so the duke refused her, with insulting language. The king sided with his mother, driving the duke into a conspiracy with the Emperor and the King of England. Once discovered, he was stripped of his titles and possessions in 1523. With his death in 1527, the line of Bourbon-Montpensier became extinct in the male line. The next senior line, of Bourbon-Vendôme, was not allowed to inherit the forfeited lands.

House of Bourbon
Dukes of Bourbon	Bourbon-La Marche
Counts of Montpensier	Counts of La Marche	Counts of Vendôme	Bourbon-Carency
Bourbon-Vendôme	Dukes of Montpensier
Kings of France and Navarre	House of Condé
Princes of Condé	Princes of Conti	Counts of Soissons

Therefore, the heir male of the Bourbon family belonged to the House of Bourbon-Vendôme from 1527 onwards, in the person of Charles de Bourbon, Duke of Vendôme until he died in 1537. Charles remained loyal to the king, even though Francis I had denied him the Bourbon inheritance and the inheritance of his wife, the sister of Charles IV, Duke of Alençon. Charles's son, Antoine, became king of Navarre, and his grandson, Henry IV, became king of France. All of the present-day family members descend from him. As the new reigning dynasty, the House of Bourbon-Vendôme was simply called the House of Bourbon.

=== 1523–1531 – House of Savoy ===
In 1523, Louise of Savoy, mother of King Francis I of France, challenged the succession to the estate of Suzanne, Duchess of Bourbon, who died childless. She claimed the succession as the heir by proximity of blood, as a descendant of the House of Bourbon through her mother. Seeing no hope of prevailing against the king's mother, the Constable of Bourbon went into the service of Charles V, Holy Roman Emperor. In 1531, the duchy merged into the royal domain for the first time.

- 1523–1531: Louise of Savoy, Duchess suo jure of Auvergne and Bourbon, Duchess of Nemours (1476–1531)

=== Second and third creation: 1544–1574 – House of Valois ===
The title was vacant til 1544 and then created for Charles II de Valois, the youngest and third son of King François I of France and Claude, Duchess of Brittany. Being already Duke of Angoulême and then Duke of Orleans, he received in 1544 the duchy as a prerogative, but the prince died soon after. When he died, the duchy returned to the Crown. The title was again vacant between 1544 and 1566. In 1566, for the second and final time, the Duchy of Bourbon constituted part of an apanage, in this case that of the Duke of Angoulême, Duke of Orleans and Duke of Anjou and then future Henry III. Upon his accession to the throne in 1574, the duchy returned to the Crown.

- 1544–1545: Charles II de Valois, Duke of Orléans (1522–1545), youngest and third son of Francis I of France. He died childless and the title returned to the crown.
- 1566–1574: Henry, Duke of Anjou (1551–1589), younger brother of Charles IX of France. He succeeded to the throne in 1574, and his titles merged into the crown.

=== Fourth creation: 1661–1830 – House of Bourbon-Condé ===
The title went vacant for almost a hundred years until granted in 1661 to Louis, Grand Condé, a French general and the most illustrious representative of the Condé branch of the House of Bourbon. However, he and most of his descendants preferred to use their ancient courtesy title, Prince of Condé. The title of Duke of Bourbon thereby became a courtesy title, used by the heir of the Prince of Condé.

- 1661–1667: Louis, Grand Condé (1621–1686), also Duke of Enghien and Prince of Condé
- 1667–1670: Henri de Bourbon (1667–1670), grandson of preceding, died in infancy
- 1670–1709: Louis, Duke of Bourbon (1668–1710), brother of preceding, afterwards Prince of Condé
- 1709–1736: Louis Henri, Duke of Bourbon (1692–1740), son of preceding, afterwards Prince of Condé
- 1736–1772: Louis Joseph, Prince of Condé (1736–1818), son of preceding, afterwards Prince of Condé
- 1756–1830: Louis Henri, Prince of Condé (1756–1830), son of preceding, afterwards Prince of Condé. At his death in 1830, the House of Condé became extinct.

=== Without legal creation: 1950–present – House of Bourbon-Anjou ===
The Spanish branch of the Bourbons adopted the title of Duke of Bourbon since 1950, symbolizing the fact that it is the eldest branch of the Bourbon family and of all Capetians. As France today is a republic, the title has no legal basis.

- 1950–1975: Alphonse de Bourbon (1936–1989), afterwards Duke of Anjou, also Duke of Cádiz
- 1975–1984: François de Bourbon (1972–1984), son of preceding, formerly Duke of Brittany
- 1984–1989: Louis Alphonse de Bourbon (1974–present), brother of preceding, formerly Duke of Touraine, afterwards Duke of Anjou

== See also ==
- House of Bourbon-Vendôme
- House of Bourbon-Montpensier
- Duchess of Bourbon
