= Duchy of Auvergne =

The Duchy of Auvergne in 1477, enveloping the County of Auvergne.

The Duchy of Auvergne was established in 1360 by the French King John II of France on the Terre royale d'Auvergne ('Royal land of Auvergne'), while the County of Auvergne continued to exist in parallel.

== Creation of the Royal land of Auvergne (1213) ==
Since the Counts of Auvergne had been supporters of the English Plantagenet, the French King Philip Augustus occupied part of Auvergne (including the capital Riom) in 1195 and added it to the Domaine royal in 1213 as Terre royale d'Auvergne.

After another military intervention by the King, caused by a dispute between the pro-English Count Guy II of Auvergne and his pro-French brother Robert of Auvergne, Bishop of Clermont, the entire County was confiscated and incorporated into the Domaine royale. Guy's son and successor William X of Auvergne later received back a small part of Auvergne, after breaking his contacts with England in 1228, and pledging his loyalty to the King of France.

In 1356, King John II of France made the Terre d'Auvergne a Duchy for his third son John, Duke of Berry. John’s daughter Marie bore the title Duchess of Auvergne from 1370. With John’s death in 1416, the Duchy reverted to the crown, but was passed on to Mary’s third husband John I, Duke of Bourbon in 1426.

With the extinction of the Dukes of Bourbon in 1527, the title of Duke of Auvergne also expired.

== Dukes of Auvergne ==
See: List of Dukes of Auvergne

== Sources ==
- Josiane Teyssot, « La frontière occidentale de l’Auvergne du xiie au xve siècle », siècles, no 15, 2002
