= Suzanne, Duchess of Bourbon =

Suzanne
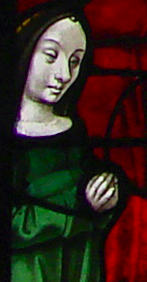
- A stained-glass portrait of Suzanne in Moulins Cathedral

Duchess of Bourbon
- Reign: 10 October 1503 – 28 April 1521
- Predecessor: Peter II

Duchess of Auvergne
- Reign: 10 October 1503 – 28 April 1521
- Predecessor: Peter II
- Born: 10 May 1491; Château de Châtellerault
- Died: 28 April 1521 (aged 29); Palace of Châtellerault
- Burial: Priory of Souvigny, Souvigny, Auvergne, France
- Spouse: Charles III, Duke of Bourbon (m. 1505)
- House: Bourbon
- Father: Peter II, Duke of Bourbon
- Mother: Anne of France

Suzanne de Bourbon (10 May 1491 – 28 April 1521) was suo jure Duchess of Bourbon and Auvergne from 1503 to her death alongside her husband Charles III.

== Early life ==
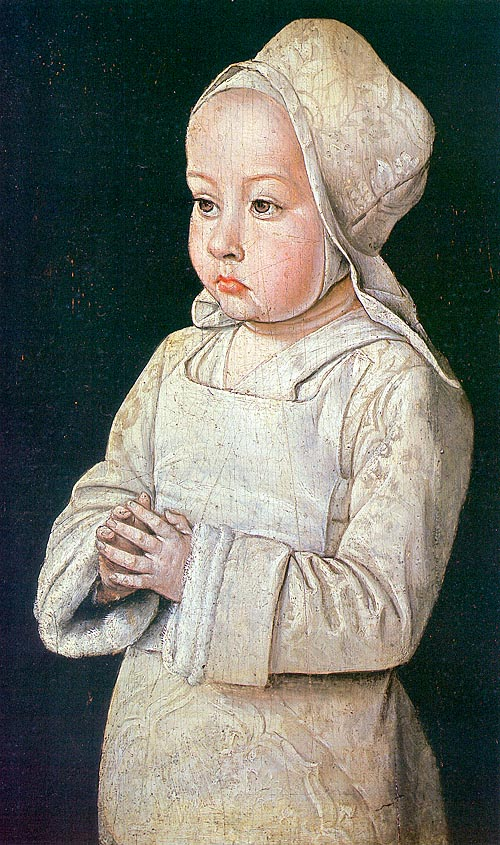
Portrait of Suzanne executed for the Duke and Duchess of Bourbon. It is the right wing of a Bourbon triptych. c. 1492-1493

Suzanne was born the second child and only daughter of Duke Peter II of Bourbon and Anne of France, herself the eldest daughter of King Louis XI. From 1483 to 1491, Suzanne's parents served as co-regents of France during the minority of Anne's younger brother, King Charles VIII. Furthermore, Anne's younger sister (and Suzanne's aunt), Joan, was (briefly) queen of France as wife of Louis XII, who succeeded Charles VIII in 1498.

== Succession ==
Suzanne had an elder brother, Charles, who was born in 1476 and died unmarried in 1498. After this death at the age of 22, Suzanne's father grew concerned about the succession of the Bourbon lands, having no surviving sons or brothers. Under Salic law, his heir presumptive was Louis de Bourbon-Montpensier, head of the Montpensiers, a cadet branch of the Bourbons. Montpensier was Suzanne's second cousin, their grandfathers being brothers.

The year 1498 saw Anne's brother King Charles VIII die unexpectedly, after hitting his head on a low doorway. As no male heirs remained, the succession of France itself was now in question, for the closest agnatic dynast, Louis XII, was a second-cousin once removed to Charles VIII (and to Anne). Having served as Charles' co-regents, the powerful couple held enough influence to hinder the succession of Louis XII. They made a clever bargain with him: for the Bourbon support of his accession, Louis XII would have to issue official letters recognizing the seven-year-old Suzanne as rightful heir to her father's Bourbon lands. Louis had little choice but to agree to this novel proceeding, at least for the moment. The relatively novel Salic law which precluded the succession of females, became the cornerstone of French laws and customs. Indeed, that law allowed Louis, rather than Anne, to succeed to the throne of France. To Anne's credit, when she handed over Bourbon lands to Louis XII, the last independent duchy in France was in good stead, being both prosperous and peaceful.

In 1503, Duke Peter died and Suzanne became duchess. Anne was regent during Suzanne's minority and groomed the intelligent Suzanne with the thought of her daughter ascending to the throne. Her lessons included astronomy, mathematics, and religion. But more importantly, Anne taught her the ways of the court. Beyond the social graces, being kind, well-spoken, and sociable were also key. But the most important lesson she imparted to her daughter was never to react to anything told her and to keep her thoughts to herself, lest they somehow betray her. Anne knew only too well that the politics of the court were often underhanded, if not treacherous.

== Duchess ==
As the agnatic heir to the Bourbon lands, Louis II, Count of Montpensier, was a suitable young man, and as marriage with him would avert a struggle for the succession (quite inevitable otherwise), Suzanne's parents initially groomed him as their future son-in-law, despite the concession they had extracted from Louis XII regarding the succession. However, the teenage Montpensier mortally offended Peter by condemning and denouncing the letters patent concerning the succession which Louis XII had issued, and asserting that succession to the Bourbon lands and titles was his own patrimony and birthright and not something he needed to thank his wife or her father for.

An enraged Peter decided to betroth Suzanne to Charles IV, Duke of Alençon, a great favourite of Louis XII, and therefore likely to be able to protect the duchy against both Bourbon-Montpensier challenges and royal encroachment. Anne was not in favour of this arrangement because of the political complications it would certainly cause, since Bourbon-Montpensier would definitely pursue his dynastic claim. However, Peter prevailed and the contract of betrothal was signed on 21 March 1501 at Moulins, Alençon being eleven years old and Suzanne nine.

Two years later, and before the wedding could be solemnised, Peter died of a fever. Incidentally, Louis of Montpensier had also died before this, and had been succeeded by his younger brother Charles. With Peter and Louis both dead, the issues which had plagued their relationship could also be laid to rest. Anne broke off the arrangement with Alençon and arranged for Suzanne to marry the next Bourbon heir-male, Charles, thereby averting a succession dispute over the Bourbon inheritance. On 10 May 1505, at Château du Parc-les-Moulins, Suzanne was married to Charles. He was immediately made co-ruler of the Bourbon lands. After the wedding, the duke and duchess of Bourbon made a tour through their domains along with Anne, something they would repeat many times during their rule.

It does not appear that Suzanne participated in state affairs: her husband and her mother jointly managed the affairs of the duchies and were described as good partners in administration and politics. Duchess Suzanne reportedly had delicate health and was frequently described by chronicles as being of a 'general disposition' and having a 'deformity', though her condition is not described more closely. A son was born to Charles and Suzanne on 17 July 1517 and was baptised Francis in October 1517 in honour of Charles' good friend King Francis I of France. The child was given the title Count of Clermont. However, he died after a few months. Suzanne later gave birth to stillborn (or short-lived) twins.

Suzanne died at Château de Châtellerault in 1521. The funeral ceremony took place in the Cathedral of Notre-Dame. She was buried in Souvigny Priory, Souvigny. Her health had been frail throughout her last years. Her mother, who had always been fearful about her daughter's health, outlived her by one year. Her widower, Duke Charles III of Bourbon, remained Duke and was inconsolable and, thanks to his great fortune, he organized a sumptuous funeral, worthy of a king's granddaughter. He never remarried and died childless in 1527, after which the lands of the dukes of Bourbon were merged into the kingdom of France.

== Legacy ==
The death of Suzanne and Charles marked respectively the extinctions of the two senior-most branches of the Bourbon family, namely Suzanne's natal "Bourbon" branch and Charles's "Bourbon-Montpensier" branch. The agnatic heir to both was their fifth cousin, Charles, Duke of Vendôme, head of the "Bourbon-Vendome" branch, which came to be called simply "the House of Bourbon" because it was now the senior-most branch. (The elder branches of the House of Bourbon were descended in the male line from Peter I, Duke of Bourbon whereas the Bourbon-Vendome branch was descended in the male line from Peter's younger brother James I, Count of La Marche.) Indeed, the Bourbon-Vendome branch was destined also to inherit the throne of France: Charles, Duke of Vendôme was the grandfather of Henry IV of France, the first "Bourbon" king of France.

| Preceded by Peter II | Duchess of Auvergne and Bourbon; Countess of Clermont-en-Beauvaisis, Forez, and La Marche; 1503–1521 | Succeeded by Charles III |
