= Bagneux, Allier =

Bagneux
- Commune
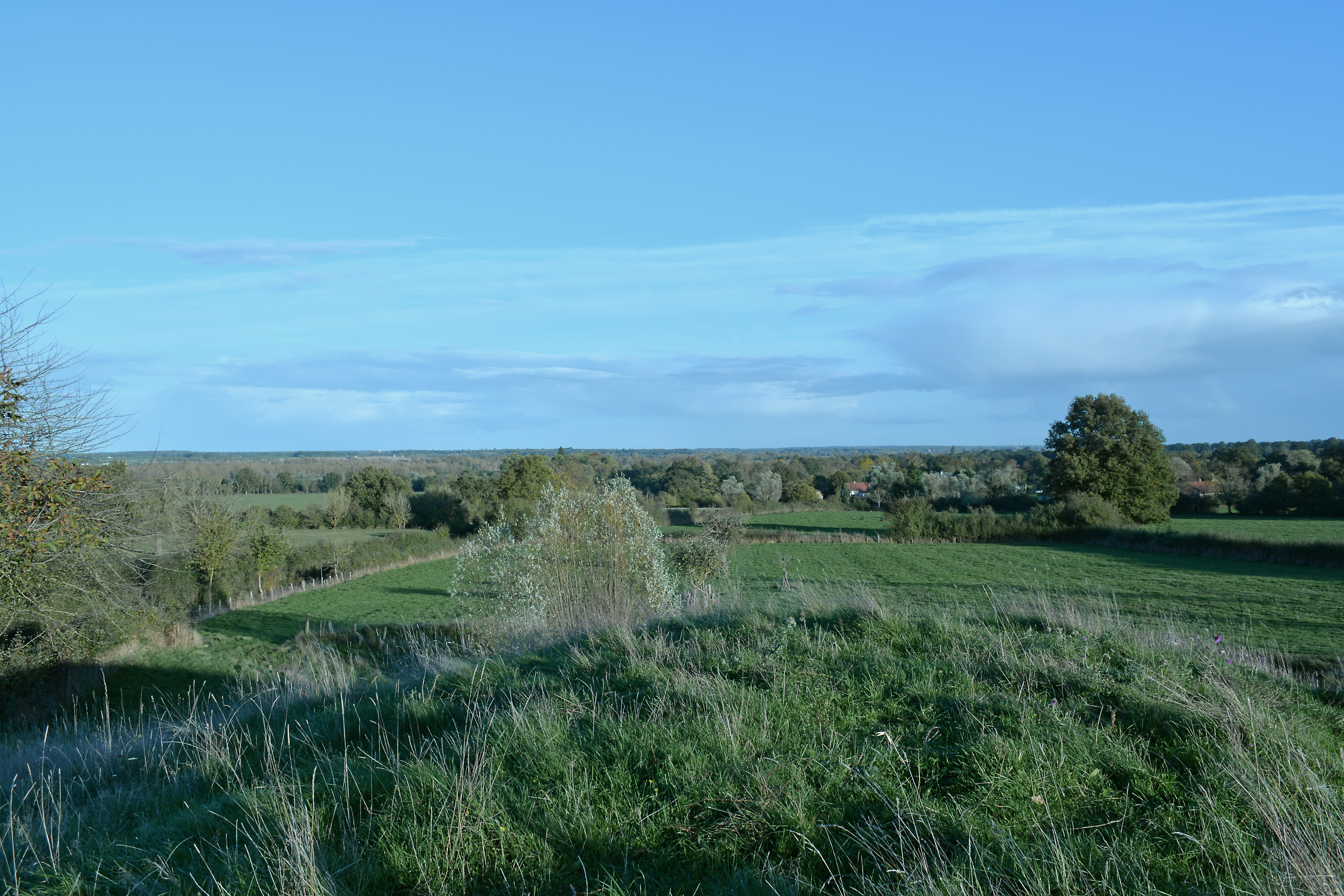
- Site of the Belleperche Fort

- Coat of arms
- Location of Bagneux
- Location within France Location within Auvergne-Rhône-Alpes
- Coordinates: 46°39′30″N 3°12′23″E
- Country: France
- Region: Auvergne-Rhône-Alpes
- Department: Allier
- Arrondissement: Moulins
- Canton: Moulins-1
- Intercommunality: CA Moulins Communauté

Government
  - Mayor (2026–32): Jean-Damien Barre
- Area^{1}: 24.87 km^{2} (9.60 sq mi)
- Elevation: 212 m (696 ft)
- Highest elevation: 262 m (860 ft)
- Lowest elevation: 192 m (630 ft)
- Population (2023): 329
  - Density: 13.2/km^{2} (34.3/sq mi)
- Time zone: UTC+01:00 (CET)
  - Summer (DST): UTC+02:00 (CEST)
- INSEE/Postal code: 03015 /03460
- ^{1} French Land Register data, which excludes lakes, ponds, glaciers > 1 km^{2} (0.386 sq mi or 247 acres) and river estuaries.

Bagneux (French pronunciation: [baɲø]) is a commune of the Allier department in the Auvergne-Rhône-Alpes region of central France.

The inhabitants of the commune are known as Bagnolais or Bagnolaises.

== Geography ==
Bagneux is located some 30 km (19 mi) south-east of Sancoins and 15 km (9.3 mi) north-west of Moulins. Access to the commune is by the D287 from Couzon in the west which goes to the village. The D101 comes from Aubigny in the north-west and passes through the commune and the village continuing south-east to Montilly. The D13 from Couzon to Montilly passes through the south-west of the commune. The D133 comes from Aurouër in the east and passes through the village before continuing south-west to Agonges. There are several hamlets in the commune: Les Amiel, Saligny, and Ray. There are large forests in the west of the commune with the eastern half mostly farmland.

The Allier river flows north-west along the eastern border of the commune although it does not correspond exactly to the border and small portions of the commune are on the right bank. Many streams rise in the commune and flow eastwards to join the Allier. There are also several small lakes in the commune, both natural and artificial, which feed the streams.

== History ==
The Chateau of Belleperche, located on the territory of the commune, was besieged in 1370 during the Hundred Years War. Free companies of Gascon mercenaries and marauders working for the English seized it in 1369 and retained as prisoner the Dowager Duchess of Bourbon, Isabella de Valois. The castle was besieged by the troops of the Dukes of Bourbon and Burgundy. The "Free companies" were expelled, but they took the duchess with them as hostage.

=== Heraldry ===
Arms of Bagneux	Blazon: Argent, a band wavy of Azure between in chief a sword of Or with hilt of sable posed in bend, in base an oak leaf Vert also in bend; all cantoned in Gules charged with a tower of Or, port open, masoned and windowed in Sable.

== Administration ==
List of Successive Mayors

From	To	Name	Party
1838	1842	Jean François Alexandre Théodore Patissier	
1898	1908	Jean Baptiste Emile Firmin Boutry	
2001	2020	Yves Véniat	DVG
2020	Current	Jean-Damien Barre	

== Population ==
Historical population

Year	Pop.	±% p.a.
1793	425	—
1821	483	+0.46%
1846	396	−0.79%
1872	401	+0.05%
1901	459	+0.47%
1926	388	−0.67%
1946	324	−0.90%
1962	328	+0.08%
1968	293	−1.86%

Year	Pop.	±% p.a.
1975	240	−2.81%
1982	234	−0.36%
1990	276	+2.08%
1999	280	+0.16%
2007	272	−0.36%
2012	317	+3.11%
2017	321	+0.25%
2023	329	+0.41%

Source: EHESS and INSEE

== Sites and monuments ==
- The Romanesque Church of Saint Paul (12th century) is registered as an historical monument. The Church contains three items that are registered as historical objects:
  - A Commemorative Plaque for the founding of Masses by Priest François Bouquereau (1679)
  - A Bronze Bell (1527)
  - A Processional Cross (13th century)
- The Motte of the vanished fortified castle of Belleperche. This mound is at a distance of 2,138 m south-east of the Church

== Notable people linked to the commune ==
- Isabella de Valois, Dowager Duchess of Bourbon, mother of Duke Louis II of Bourbon, held prisoner in Belleperche from 1369 to 1370.

== See also ==
- Communes of the Allier department
