= Bernard de la Salle =

French mercenary captain

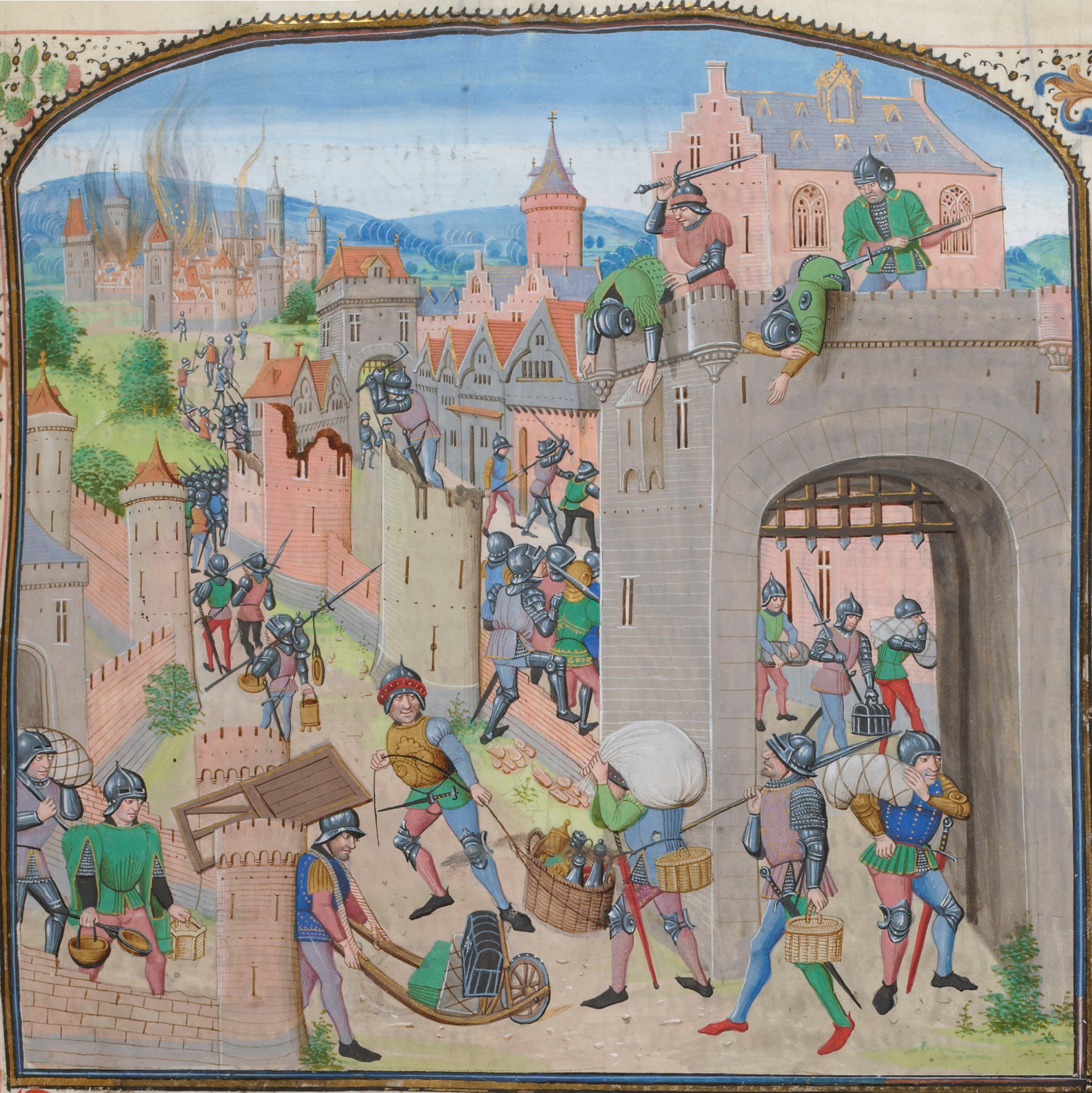
The Tard-Venus pillage Grammont in 1362, from Froissart's Chronicles.

Bernard de la Salle, was a French mercenary captain during the Hundred Years War. His story is mentioned in the Chronicles of Froissart.

At the beginning of his career, in 1359, Bernard de la Salle, also known as Bernardon de la Salle, was in the service of Jean III de Grailly Captal de Buch. On Monday 18 November 1359 he climbed the castle of Clermont-en-Beauvaisis with steel grabs.

However, after the Treaty of Brétigny (1360) He and his men found themselves unemployed and so become one of the 30 or so, so-called Tard-Venus bandits. that ranged the French country side pillaging towns.

In 1368, he is still in France with Bérard d'Albret, Gaillard de la Motte, Bernard d'Eauze and Bour de Badefol.

In 1369, along with Bernard de Wisk and Hortingo de la Salle, he captured Belleperche Castle, where Isabella of Valois, Duchess of Bourbon lived. The castle was, however, besieged by the troops of the Dukes of Bourbon and Burgundy. The Duke of Bourbon was her son, and Frossart tells us that the siege redoubt he organized was "as strong and as well fortified as a good town might have been". The "Free companies" in the castle were expelled, but they took the duchess with them as hostage.

Isabella was also mother-in-law of King Charles V of France, and remained a prisoner of Bernard de la Salle until 1372, when the king arranged for the ransom to be paid.
