= Bernard de Wisk =

Mercenary captain of the Hundred Years War

Bernard de Wisk was a mercenary captain and sometime brigand of the Hundred Years War.

Wisk started out a mercenary. However, after the Treaty of Brétigny was signed on 8 May 1360, Wisk found himself unemployed and so turned to Brigandry. that ranged the French country side pillaging towns.

In 1369, with Bernardon and Hortingo de la Salle, he seized Belleperche Castle, home to Isabella of Valois, Duchess of Bourbon, mother-in-law of the king, Charles V of France and demanded a ransom.

The castle was, however, besieged by the troops of the Dukes of Bourbon and Burgundy. The Duke of Bourbon (Louis II, Duke of Bourbon) was her son, and John Frossart tells us that the siege redoubt he organized was "as strong and as well fortified as a good town might have been". The "Free companies" in the castle were expelled, but they took the duchess with them as hostage.

The Duchess remained a prisoner until 1372, when the king arranged for the ransom to be paid.
