= Marie de Bourbon =

Marie de Bourbon may refer to:

- Marie de Bourbon, Princess of Achaea (c. 1315–1387), empress consort of Robert of Taranto
- Marie of Bourbon (1347–1401), prioress of Poissy and daughter of Isabella of Valois, Duchess of Bourbon and Peter I, Duke of Bourbon
- Marie de Bourbon, Duchess of Calabria (1428–1448), daughter of Charles I, Duke of Bourbon
- Mary of Bourbon (1515–1538), daughter of Charles, Duke of Vendôme
- Marie de Bourbon, Duchess of Montpensier (1605–1627)
- Marie de Bourbon, Countess of Soissons (1606–1692)
- Princess Maria Pia of Bourbon-Two Sicilies (1849–1882)
- Princess Maria di Grazia of Bourbon-Two Sicilies (1878–1973)

== See also ==
- Marie Anne de Bourbon
