= Jeanne d'Ussel =

Jeanne d'Ussel, also known as Jeanne de Clermont (or Auvergne) was countess of Forez, received in inheritance, belonging to the House of Ussel. She was married to Béraud II (dauphin d'Auvergne). Through marriage, Jeanne brought the fiefdom of d’Ussel in Languedoc, and the county of Forez, and eventually became known as "Jeanne de Forez" or "Jeanne de Clermont" in reference to her husband Béraud de Clermont, Dauphin d'Auvergne of the House of Clermont-Tonnerre of the Counts of Clermont-Tonnerre.

The House of Ussel belongs to the old family branch of the viscounts of the House of Limoges created by the ancient House of Brittany of the Kingdom of Brittany originated by Judicael ap Hoel King of Domnonée or Saint Judicaël of Brittany.

== Direct Family and Descendants ==
Jeanne's marriage to Béraud II produced one daughter:

- Anne of Forez (1358 - † 1417 at Cleppé), born Lady Anne d'Auvergne Clermont and d’Ussel, countess of Forez, wife to Louis II de Bourbon (v. 1336 - † 1410), Duke of Bourbon, gave birth to James or John of Bourbon (1381 - † 1434), Duke of Auvergne.
