= Jeanne, Dauphine d'Auvergne =

Jeanne, Dauphine d'Auvergne (1414-1436) was a reigning Dauphine of Auvergne in 1426-1436. She was the co-ruler of John I, Duke of Bourbon.

She was the daughter of Beraud III. She married Louis I, Count of Montpensier.
