= Isabella of Valois, Duchess of Bourbon =

Isabella of Valois
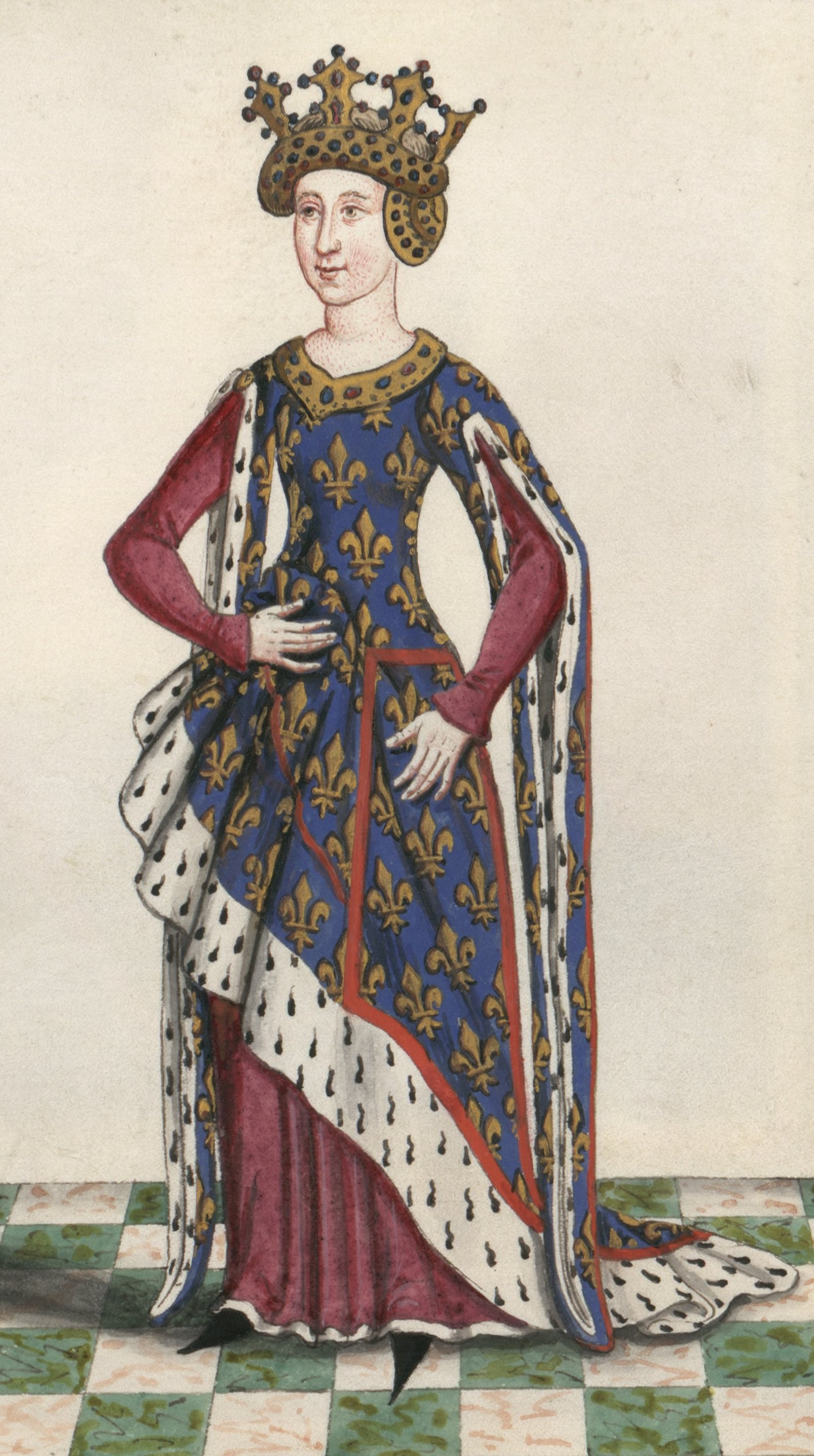

Duchess consort of Bourbon
- Tenure: 1336-1356
- Born: 1313
- Died: 26 July 1383 (aged 69–70)
- Spouse: Peter I, Duke of Bourbon (m. 1336; died 1356)
- Issue: Louis II, Duke of Bourbon; Joanna, Queen of France; Blanche, Queen of Castile; Bonne, Duchess of Savoy; Margaret of Bourbon
- House: Valois
- Father: Charles of Valois
- Mother: Mahaut of Châtillon

Isabella of Valois (French Isabelle de Valois; 1313 – 26 July 1383) was duchess of Bourbon by marriage to Peter I, Duke of Bourbon. Following her husband's death at Poitiers, she took the veil. Isabella died 26 July 1383, aged 70.

== Life ==
Isabella was the daughter of Charles of Valois by his third wife Mahaut of Châtillon. On 25 January 1336 she married Peter I, Duke of Bourbon, son of Louis I, Duke of Bourbon and Mary of Avesnes. Peter and Isabella had only one son, Louis and seven daughters. Her husband died at the Battle of Poitiers in 1356, and Isabella never remarried.

After her husband's death Isabella's son Louis became the Duke of Bourbon. In the same year 1356, Isabella arranged for her daughter Joanna to marry Charles V of France; as he was at the time the Dauphin of France, Joanna duly became Dauphine.

She had as her butler Jean Saulnier, knight, lord of Thoury-sur-Abron, councilor and Grand Chamberlain of France and bailiff of Saint-Pierre-le-Moûtier.

In 1369, the mercenaries led by Bernard de la Salle, Bernard de Wisk and Hortingo de la Salle besieged her residence, the Belleperche Castle, but they were expelled by the troops of her son, the Duke of Bourbon and the Duke of Burgundy. However, Isabella was taken hostage, and was ransomed by King Charles V of France in 1372.

Upon becoming a widow, Isabella took the veil. She died on 26 July 1383 at the age of seventy. She was buried in Eglise des Frères Mineurs in Paris.

== Issue ==
Isabella and Peter had:

1. Louis II, Duke of Bourbon, 1337-1410, became Duke of Bourbon in 1356 married Anne of Auvergne had issue.
2. Joanna of Bourbon, 1338-1378, married King Charles V of France, had issue.
3. Blanche of Bourbon, 1339-1361, married King Peter of Castile, she was murdered by him in 1361 and had no issue.
4. Bonne of Bourbon, 1341-1402, married Amadeus VI of Savoy, by whom she had issue.
5. Catherine of Bourbon, 1342-1427, married John VI of Harcourt
6. Margaret of Bourbon, 1344-1416, married Arnaud Amanieu, Lord of Albret, by whom she had issue.
7. Isabelle of Bourbon, 1345-1345, died young
8. Marie of Bourbon, 1347-1401, prioress of Poissy

== Ancestors ==
Ancestors of Isabella of Valois, Duchess of Bourbon

8. Louis IX of France
4. Philip III of France
9. Margaret of Provence
2. Charles of Valois
10. James I of Aragon
5. Isabella of Aragon
11. Violant of Hungary
1. Isabella of Valois
12. Guy III, Count of Saint-Pol
6. Guy IV, Count of Saint-Pol
13. Matilda of Brabant
3. Mahaut of Châtillon
14. John II, Duke of Brittany
7. Marie of Brittany
15. Beatrice of England

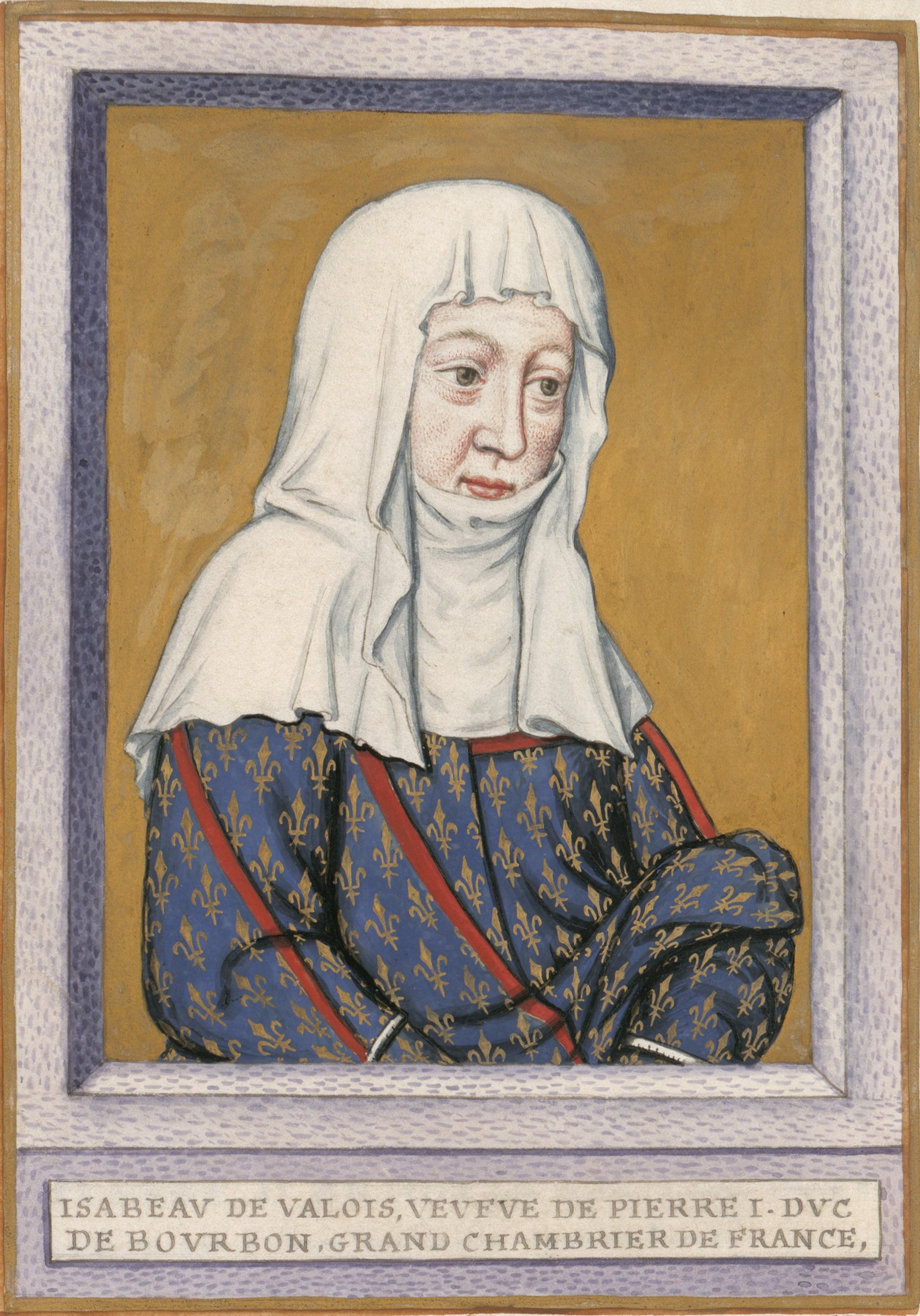
Isabella in her later years

== Sources ==
- Baudiau, Jacques-François (1965). Le Morvand. Vol. 3 (3rd ed.). Guénégaud.
- Hand, Joni M. (2013). Women, Manuscripts and Identity in Northern Europe, 1350-1550. Ashgate Publishing.
- Nicolle, David (2004). Poitiers 1356: The Capture of a King. Osprey.
- de Venette, Jean (1953). Newhall, Richard A. (ed.). The Chronicle of Jean de Venette. Translated by Birdsall, Jean. Columbia University Press.
