= Gabrielle de La Tour d'Auvergne =

French noblewoman and owner of library

Countess of Montpensier
- Reign: 1442-1474
- Born: c. 1420
- Died: 1474
- Spouse: Louis I, Count of Montpensier
- Issue: Gilbert, Count of Montpensier; John of Bourbon-Montpensier; Gabrielle de Bourbon-Montpensier; Charlotte de Bourbon-Montpensier
- House: La Tour d'Auvergne
- Father: Bertrand V of La Tour
- Mother: Jacquette du Peschin

Gabrielle de La Tour d'Auvergne, Countess of Montpensier, was born around 1420 and died in 1474. She was the second wife of Louis I, Count of Montpensier, whom she married in 1442. Gabrielle de La Tour d'Auvergne is best known for the extensive library recorded in her posthumous inventory.

== Life ==
Born c. 1420, Gabrielle was the daughter of Bertrand V of La Tour, count of Auvergne and Boulogne, and Jacquette of Peschin. Not much is known of her early life. After Gabrielle's marriage to Louis I of Bourbon-Montpensier, she seems to have adopted a strategy of collecting books in order to establish ties with other, more important aristocratic courts. She was instrumental in establishing the literary tastes of her daughter, the author Gabrielle de Bourbon, and participated in the exchange of books with various family members.

== Marriage ==
With Louis I of Bourbon-Montpensier, Gabrielle had:

- Gilbert, Count of Montpensier (1443-1496), married to Clara Gonzaga in 1482
- Louis of Bourbon-Montpensier (1444?-pre-1484?)
- John of Bourbon-Montpensier (1445-1485)
- Gabrielle de Bourbon-Montpensier (1447?-November 30, 1516), married to Louis II de La Trémoille in 1485
- Charlotte de Bourbon-Montpensier (1449-1478), married to Wolfert van Borselen in 1468

== Sources ==
- Dupont-Pierrart, Nicole (2017). Claire de Gonzague Comtesse de Bourbon-Montpensier (1464-1503): Une princess italienne a la cour de France (in French). Presses Universitaires Septentrion.
- Durand, Yves (2000). Etat et société en France aux XVIIe et XVIIIe siècles: Mélanges offerts à. Presses de l'Universite de Paris-Sorbonne.
