= Canton of Moulins-1 =

Coordinates: 46.56°N 3.32°E

Moulins-1
- Canton
- Interactive map of Moulins-1
- Country: France
- Region: Auvergne-Rhône-Alpes
- Department: Allier
- No. of communes: {{{nbcomm}}}
- Population (2023): 17,380
- INSEE code: 03 13

The canton of Moulins-1 (before March 2015: Moulins-Ouest) is an administrative division of the Arrondissement of Moulins in the Allier department in central France. It consists of the western part of the commune of Moulins and its western suburbs. It includes the following communes:

1. Aubigny
2. Avermes
3. Bagneux
4. Coulandon
5. Montilly
6. Moulins (partly)
7. Neuvy

== See also ==
- Cantons of the Allier department
