= Agonges =

- Commune
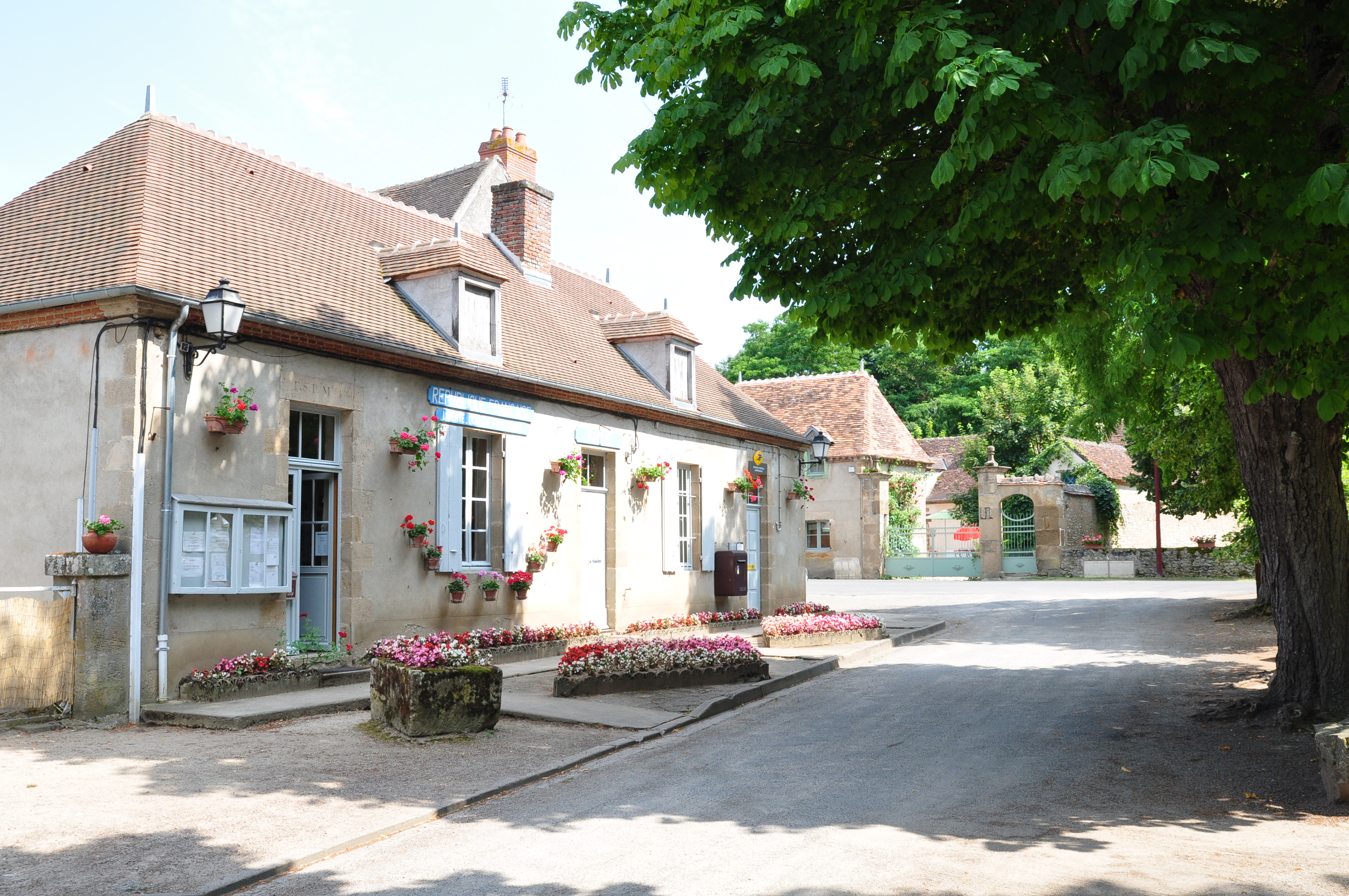
- The Town Hall and Post Office
- Location of Agonges
- Location within France Location within Auvergne-Rhône-Alpes
- Coordinates: 46°36′25″N 3°09′33″E
- Country: France
- Region: Auvergne-Rhône-Alpes
- Department: Allier
- Arrondissement: Moulins
- Canton: Souvigny
- Intercommunality: Bocage Bourbonnais

Government
  - Mayor (2026–32): Romain Juge
- Area^{1}: 24.1 km^{2} (9.3 sq mi)
- Elevation: 228 m (748 ft)
- Highest elevation: 266 m (873 ft)
- Lowest elevation: 204 m (669 ft)
- Population (2023): 300
  - Density: 12/km^{2} (32/sq mi)
- Time zone: UTC+01:00 (CET)
  - Summer (DST): UTC+02:00 (CEST)
- INSEE/Postal code: 03002 /03210
- ^{1} French Land Register data, which excludes lakes, ponds, glaciers > 1 km^{2} (0.386 sq mi or 247 acres) and river estuaries.

Agonges (French pronunciation: [aɡɔ̃ʒ]) is a commune in the Allier department in the Auvergne-Rhône-Alpes region of central France.

The inhabitants of the commune are known as Agongeois or Agongeoises.

== Geography ==
Agonges is located some 15 km north-west of Moulins and 50 km south of Nevers. It can be accessed by several roads: the D58 from Saint-Menoux in the south passes through the village and continues north, the D133 comes from the D953 in the south-west to the village and continues north-east to Bagneux, the D54 comes from Franchesse in the north-west to the village then continues east to join the D13, the D139 comes from Couzon in the north to join the D54 in the commune, and the D13 passes through the north-eastern corner of the commune. The commune consists entirely of farmland with numerous hamlets other than the village.

The hamlets are:

- Chateau de Beaumont
- Chateau de Breuil
- Chateau du Monceau
- Fontenay
- Grand Langeron
- Grand Monceau
- La Coulette
- La Croix Peyre
- La Loire
- La Raymonerie
- La Vallette
- Lafont
- Lalue
- L'Augere
- Lavault
- Le Breuron
- Le Lieu Jobier
- Le Moulin Rateau
- Le Pingon
- Le Plaix
- Les Brosses
- Les Carrons
- Les Fourches
- Les Regnauds
- Les Sacrots
- Les Sodais
- Les Tarnissats
- Petit Langeron
- Petit Monceau
- Retif

The Ours river flows through the commune from the south passing west of the village and continuing north to join the Burge which forms part of the northern border. There are small lakes in the north of the commune that link to the Burge. The Burge continues north to join the Allier south of Le Port Barreau.

== History ==
In 1807 the former commune of Breuil merged with Agonges.

== Administration ==
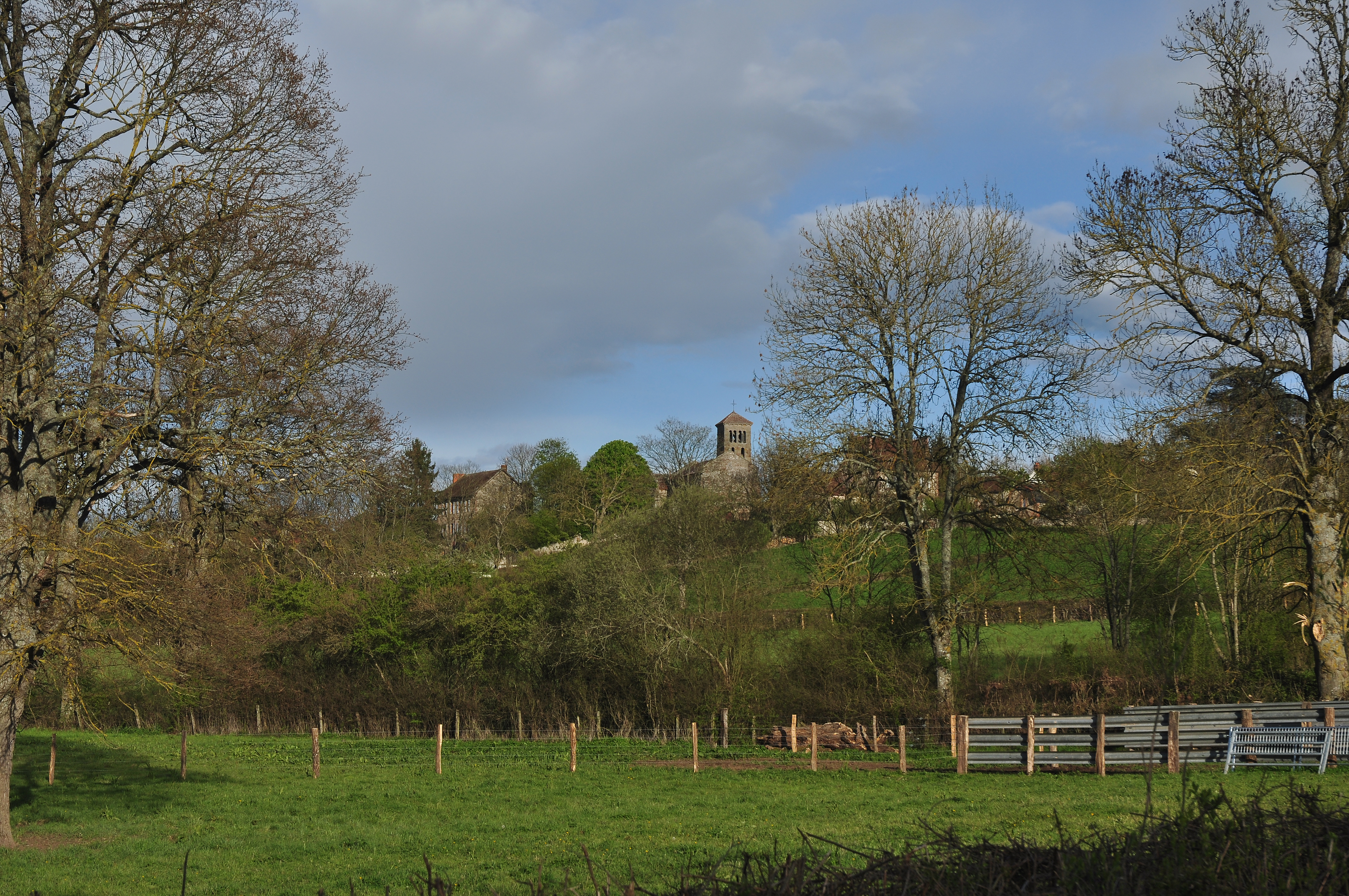
View of Agonges and its church

List of Successive Mayors of Agonges

| From | To | Name | Party |
|---|---|---|---|
| 1977 | 2014 | Guy Juge | PCF |
| 2014 | Current | Romain Juge | DVG |

== Population ==
Historical population

| Year | Pop. | ±% p.a. |
|---|---|---|
| 1793 | 750 | — |
| 1821 | 744 | −0.03% |
| 1846 | 707 | −0.20% |
| 1872 | 844 | +0.68% |
| 1901 | 756 | −0.38% |
| 1926 | 604 | −0.89% |
| 1946 | 534 | −0.61% |
| 1962 | 474 | −0.74% |
| 1968 | 437 | −1.35% |

| Year | Pop. | ±% p.a. |
|---|---|---|
| 1975 | 385 | −1.79% |
| 1982 | 327 | −2.31% |
| 1990 | 300 | −1.07% |
| 1999 | 357 | +1.95% |
| 2007 | 374 | +0.58% |
| 2012 | 355 | −1.04% |
| 2017 | 309 | −2.74% |
| 2023 | 300 | −0.49% |

Source: EHESS and INSEE

== Culture and heritage ==
=== Civil heritage ===
The commune has a number of buildings and structures that are registered as historical monuments:

- The Chateau of Sacrots (17th century)
- The Chateau of La Pommeraye (15th century) is in a manor park from the 18th century equipped with round towers in the style of the 15th century.
- The Chateau of Augère (Middle Ages) has a medieval dungeon covered with a roof extended by a Gothic building in the 19th century and still has a moat.
- The Domain of Epine (15th century), a rare example of a fortified domain from the 14th century in Bourbonnais.
- The Chateau of Echardons (1792) was rebuilt in 1792 and it remains the only castle with two towers and a dovecote.
- The Chateau of Beaumont (1740) was rebuilt in 1740 on the site of a fortified castle of which only a tower and a dovecote remain.
- The Chateau of Beaumont Park (20th century)
- The Chateau of Echardons Park (20th century). The park is centred on a lane from the early 20th century.
- The Park of La Tuilerie
- The Park of La Pommeraie (20th century)
- The Saulneraie Garden
- The Laugère Park (19th century)

Châteaux Picture Gallery

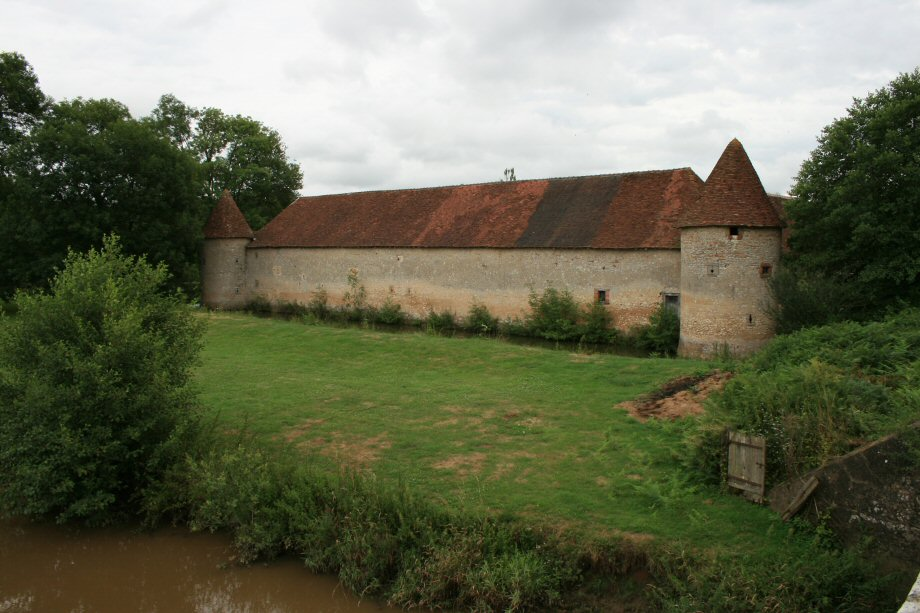
Domain of Épine A

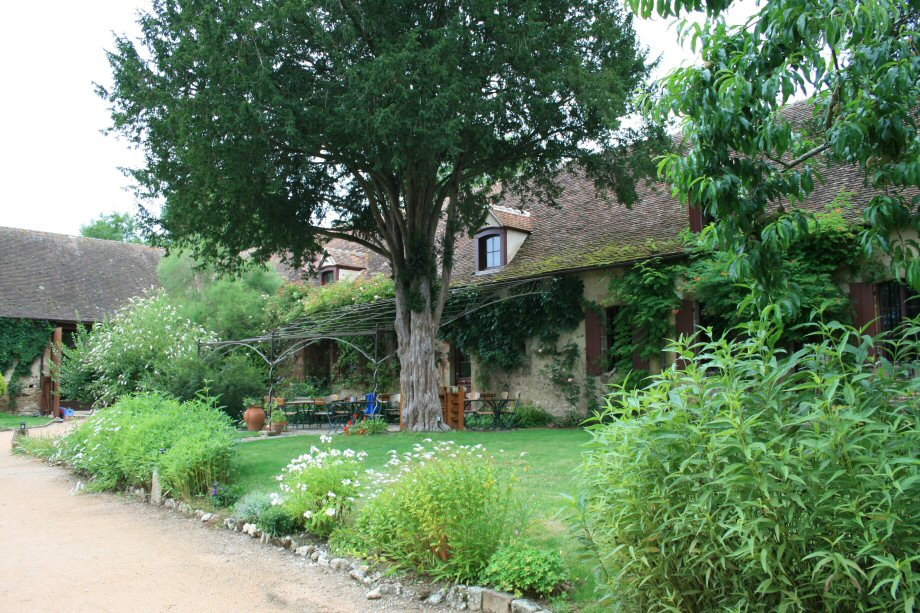
Domain of Épine B

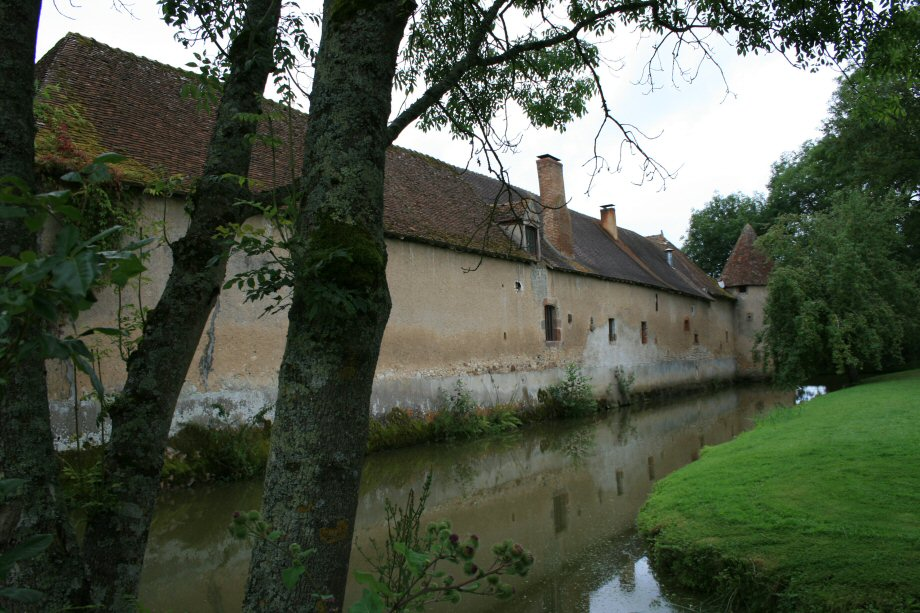
Domain of Épine C

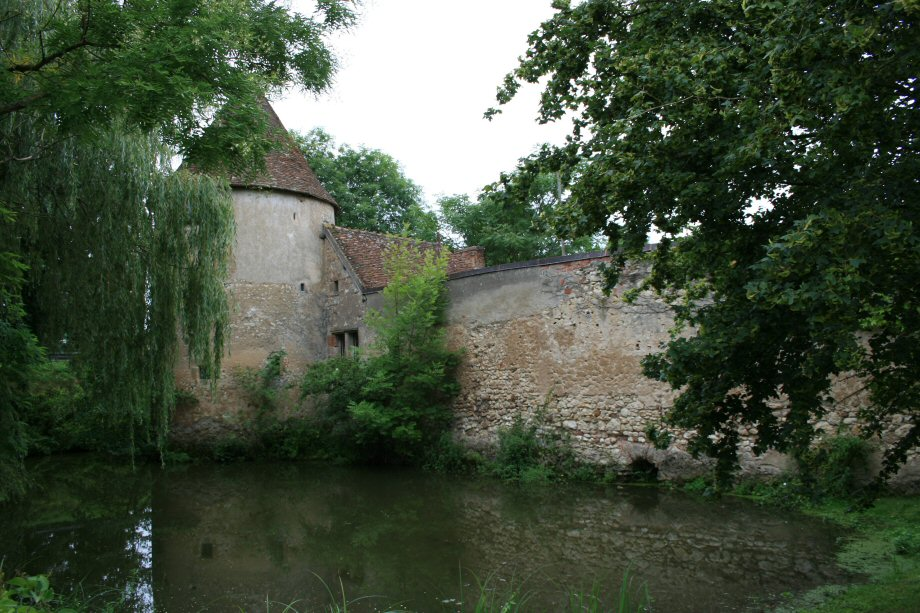
Domain of Épine D

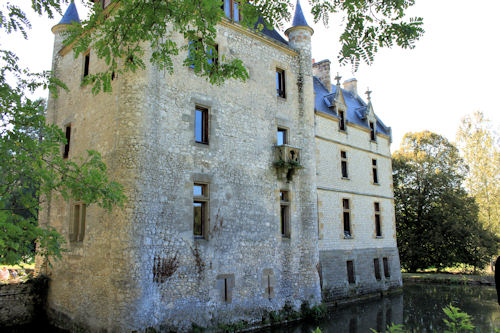
Château of Augère

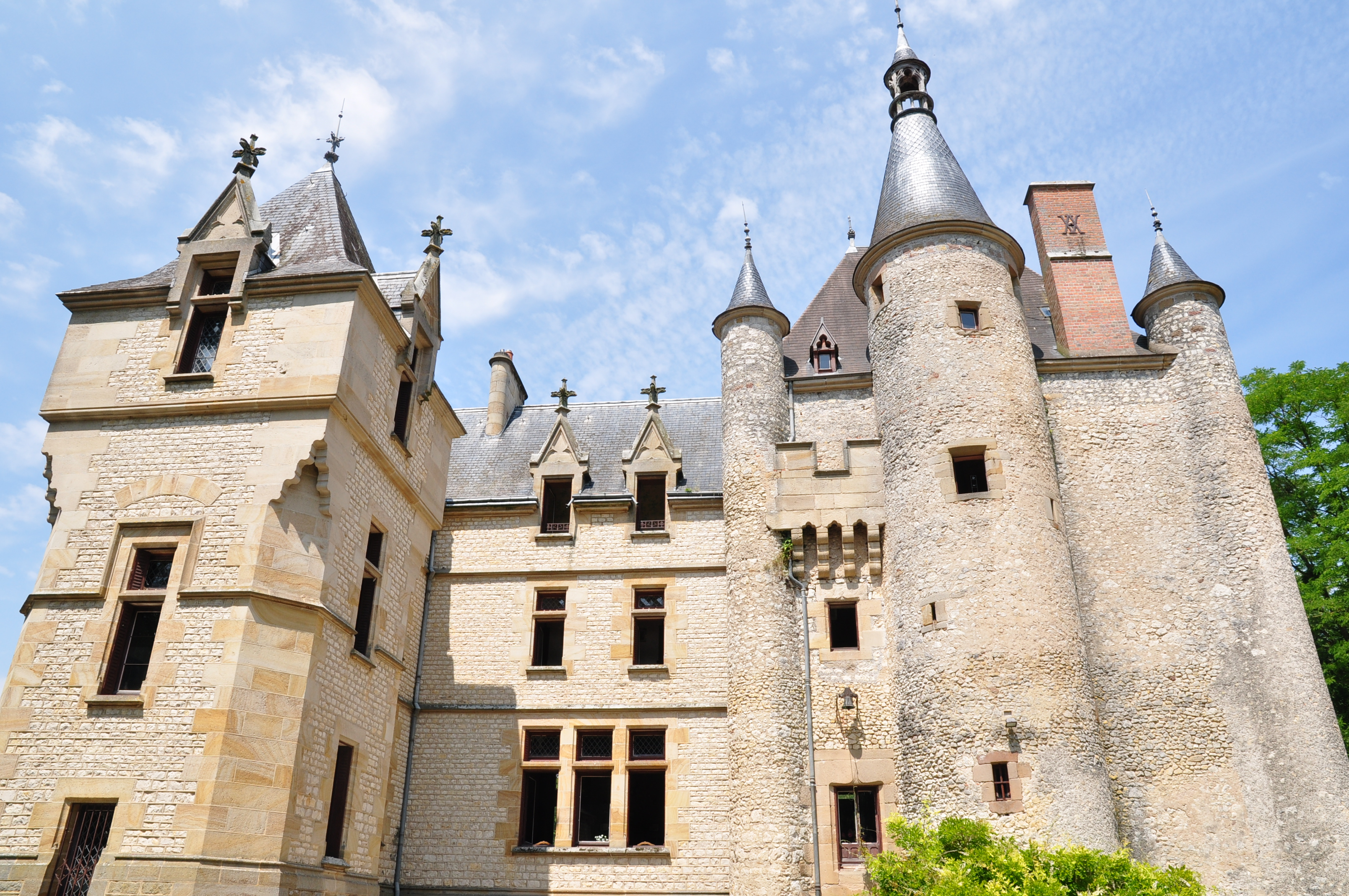
Facade of the Château of Augère

=== Religious heritage ===
The Church of Notre-Dame (12th century) is registered as an historical monument. It contains a Bronze Bell (1578) that is registered as an historical object.

Church of Notre Dame Picture Gallery

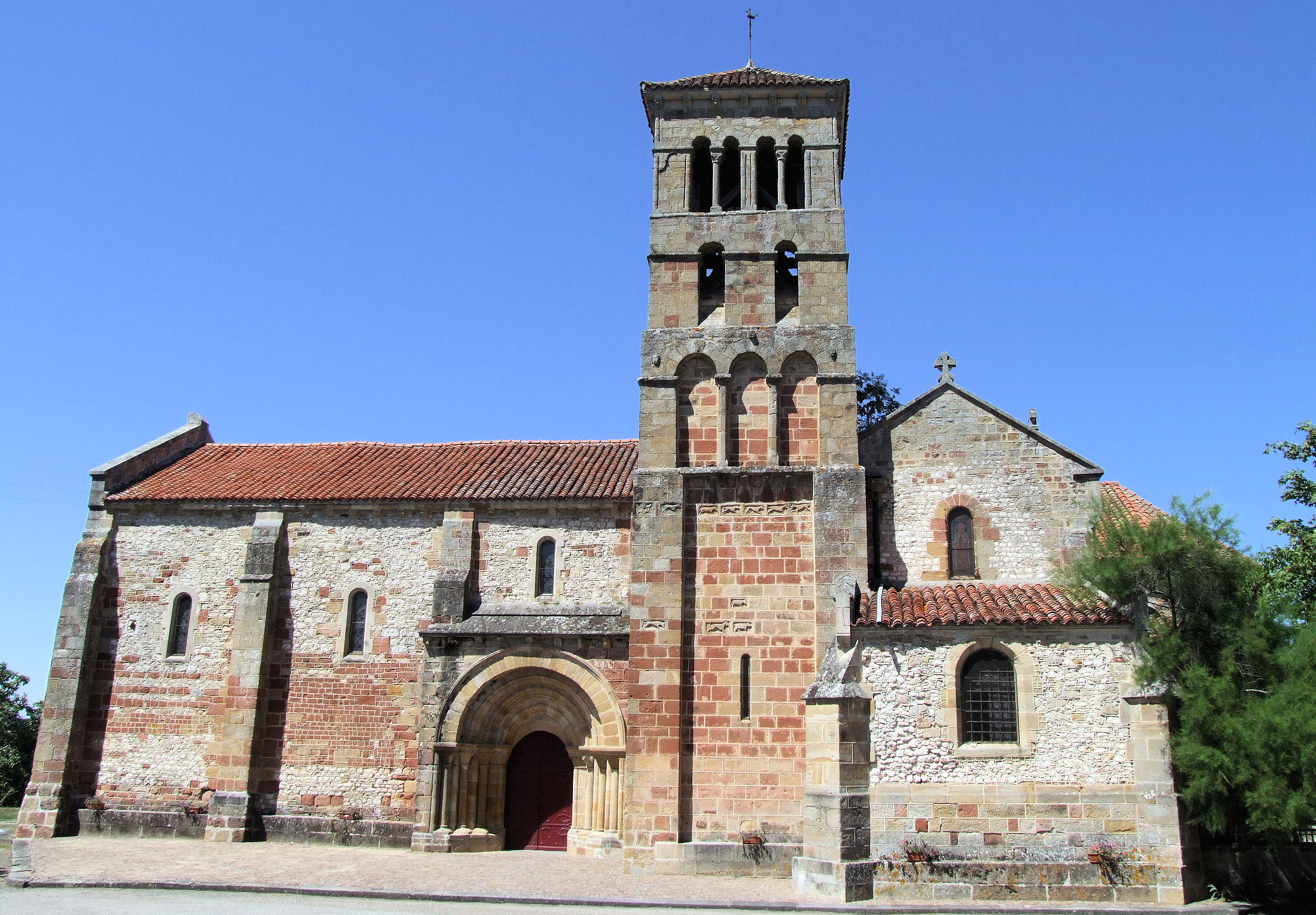
View of the Church of Notre Dame

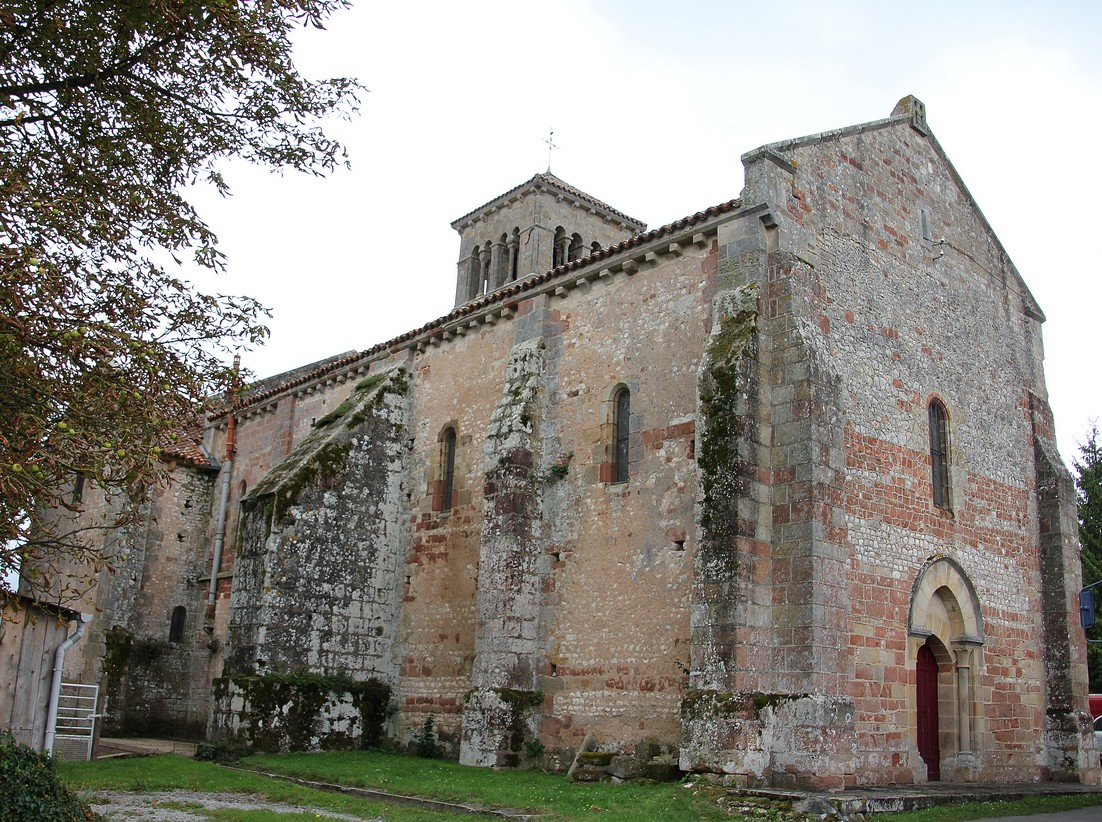
Church of Notre Dame

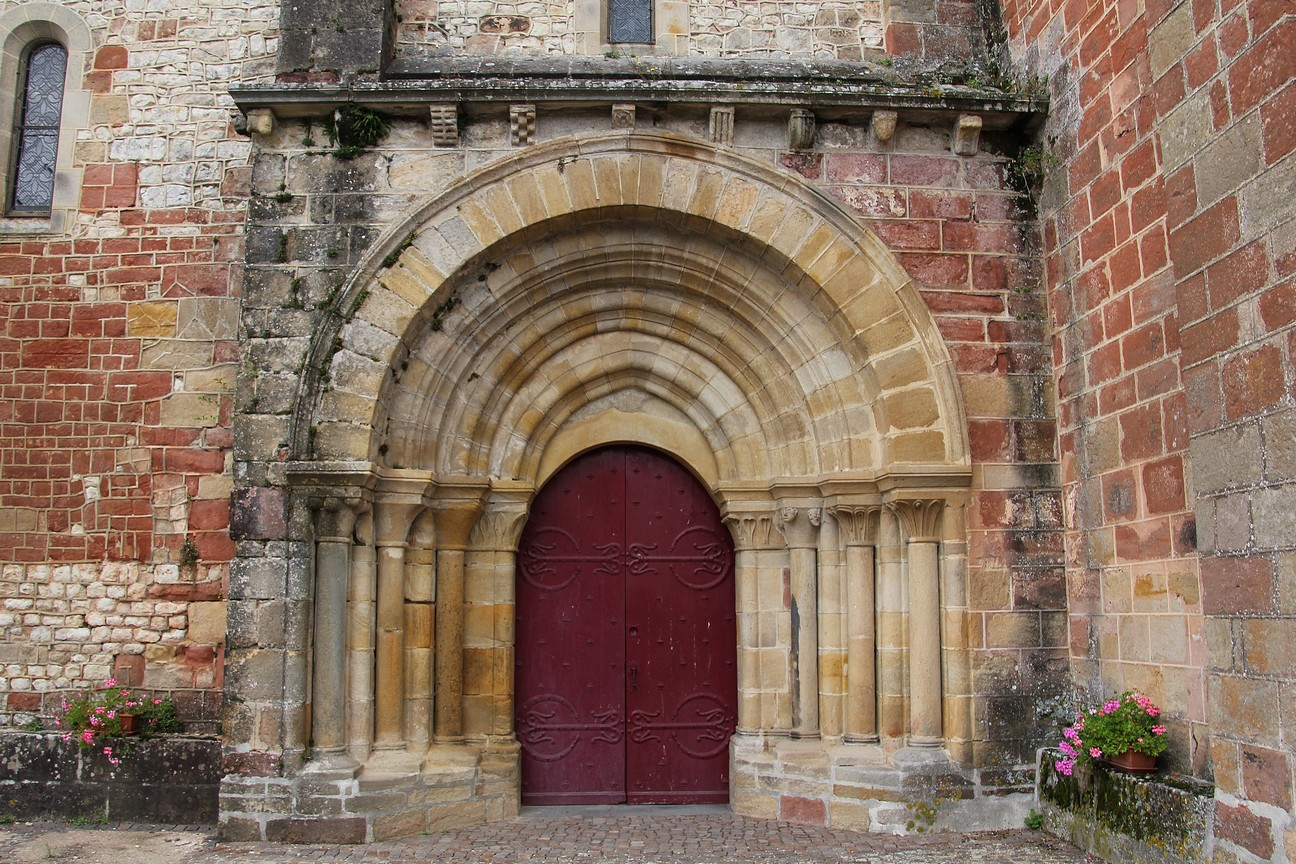
Entrance to the Church

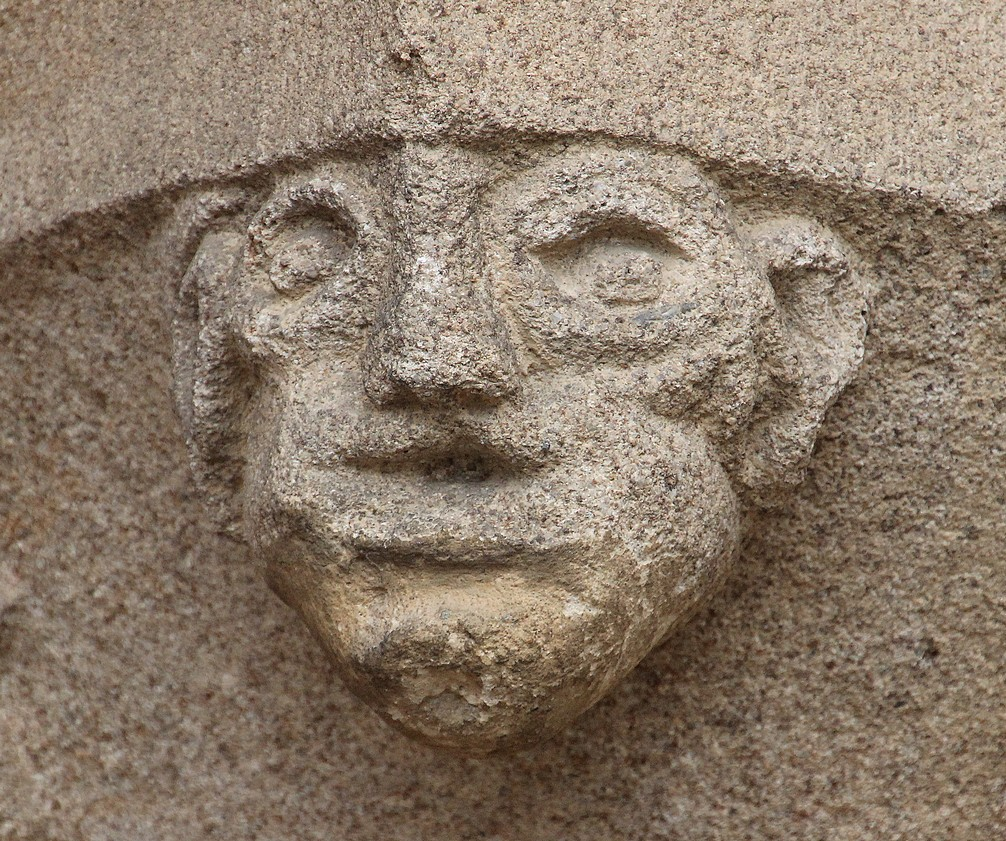
Detail on the west portal

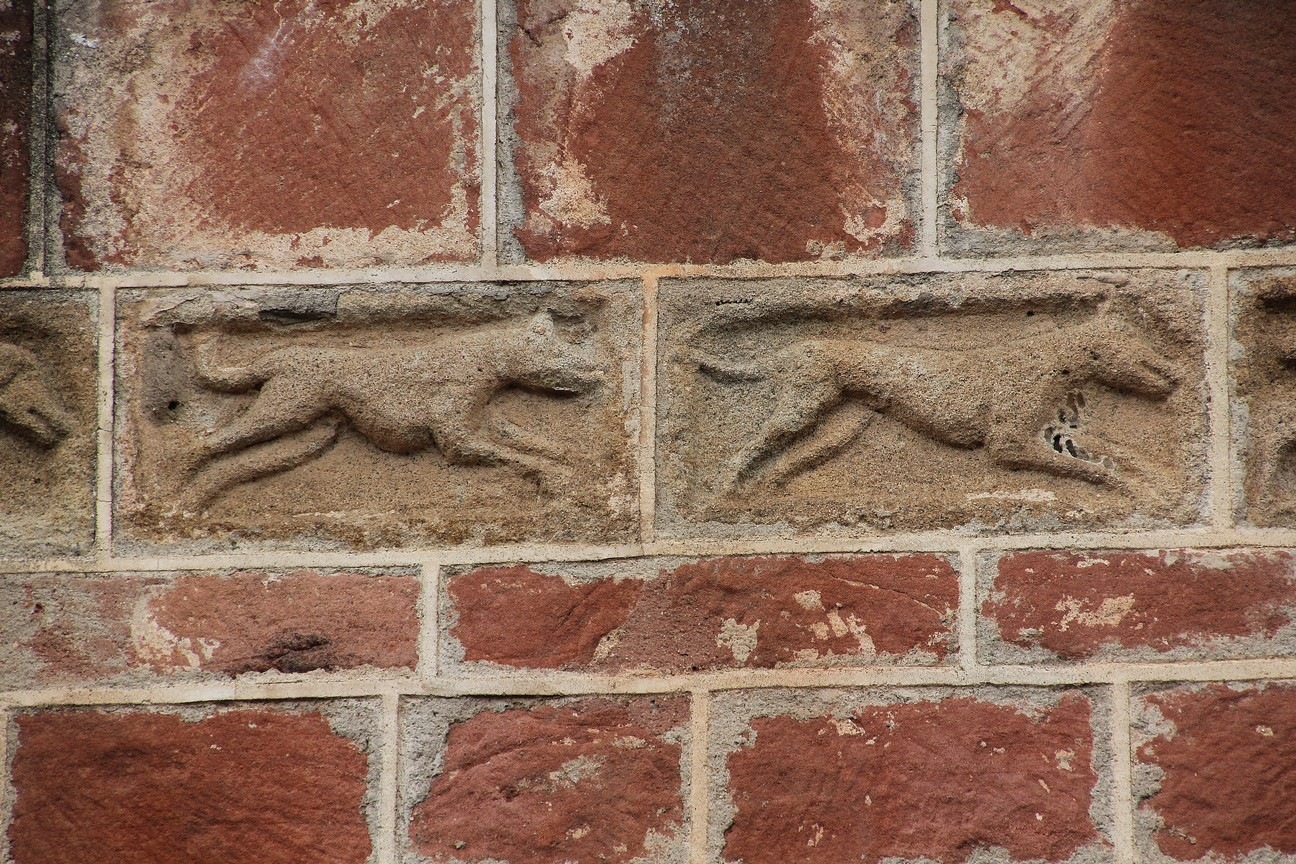
Stone sculptures on the bell tower representing a hunt

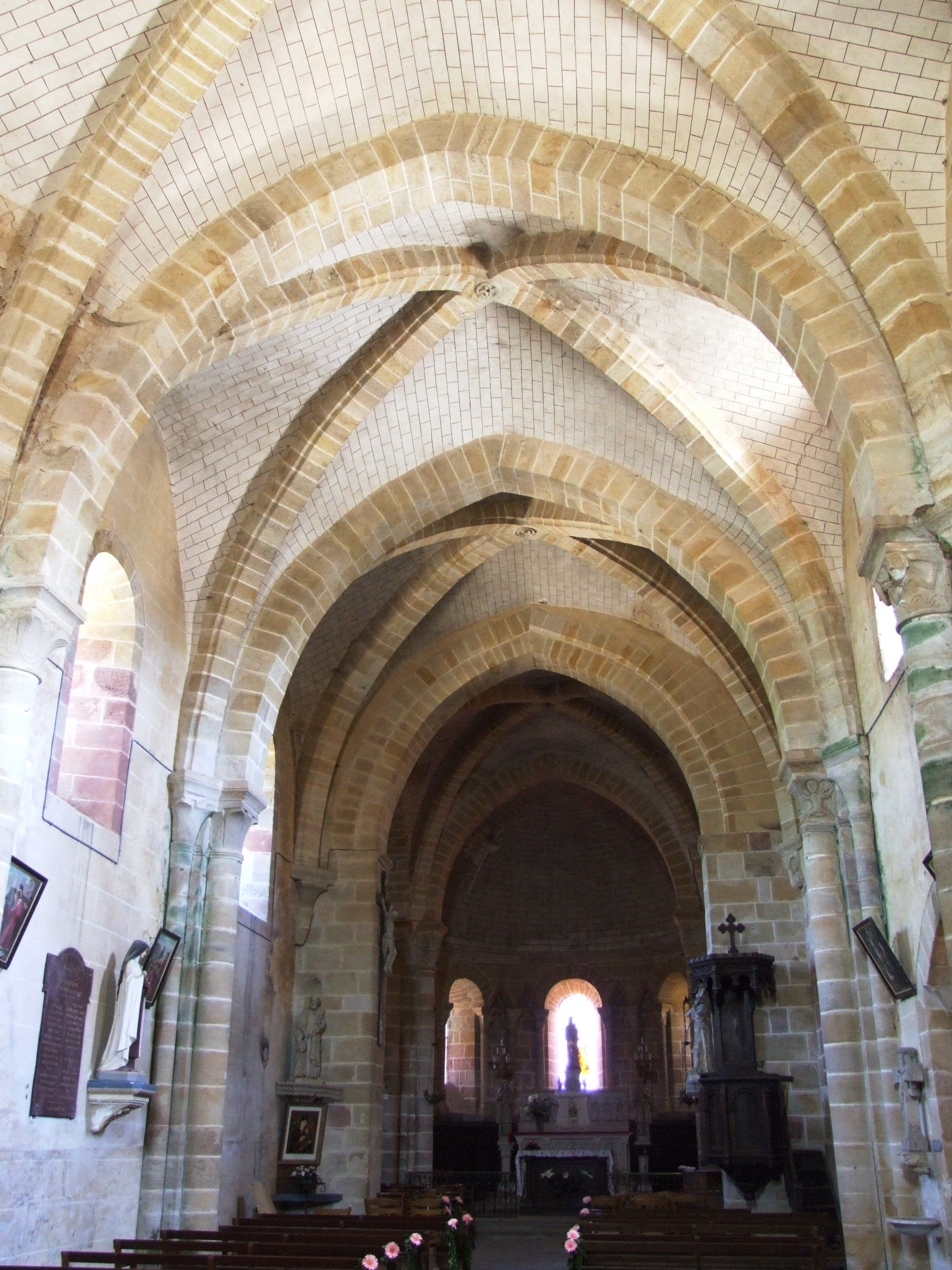
The nave of the church

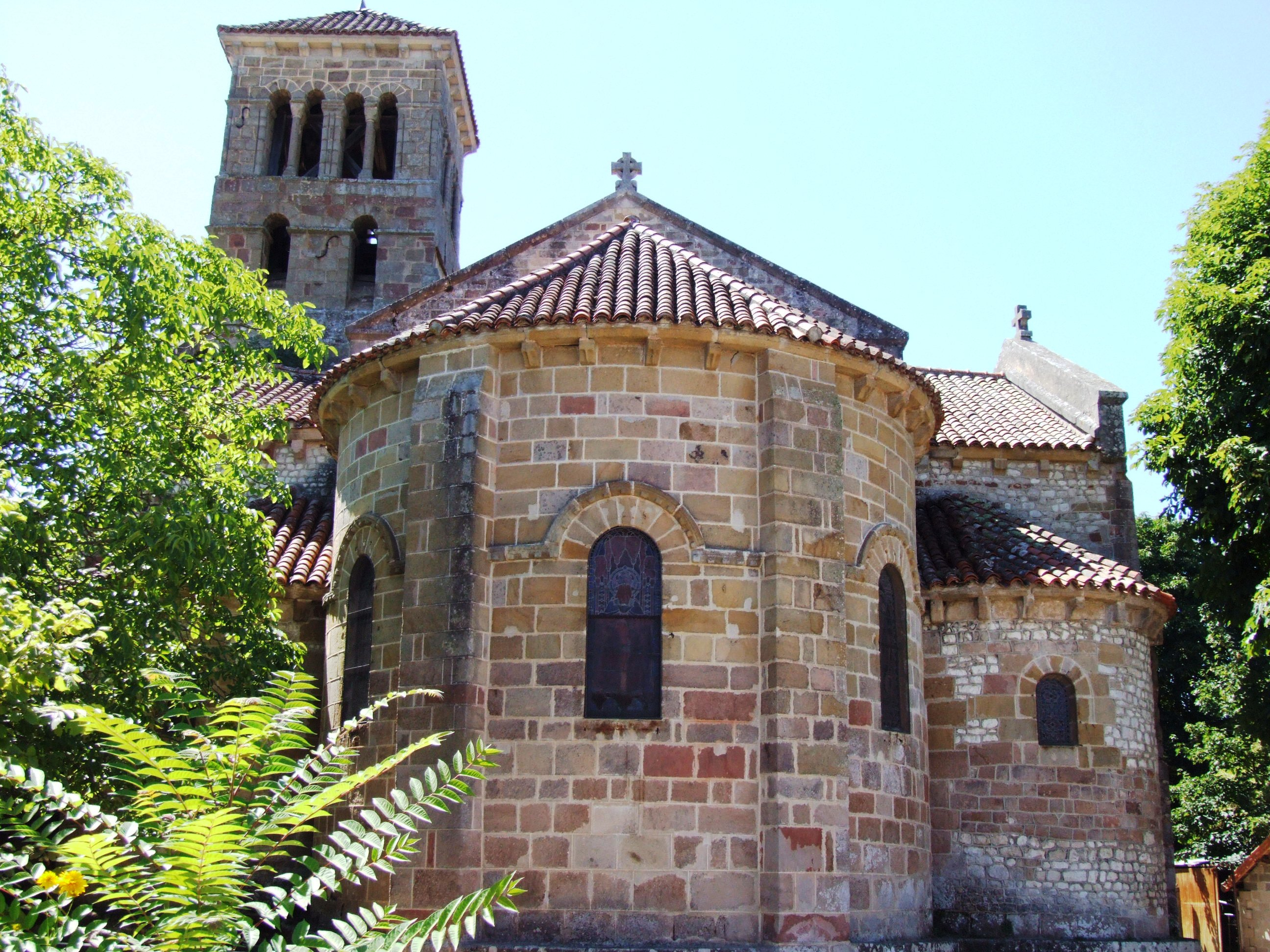
The chevet of the church

== Notable People linked to the commune ==
- François Dalphonse (1756-1821), politician, MP for Allier, owner of Beaumont Castle where he died
- Jean Bardin, radio host

== See also ==
- Communes of the Allier department

=== External links ===
- Agonges on the old National Geographic Institute website (in French)
- Agonges on Géoportail, National Geographic Institute (IGN) website (in French)
- Agonges on the 1750 Cassini Map
- High-resolution 360° Panoramas and Images of The Church of Notre-Dame | Art Atlas
