= Neuvy, Allier =

Neuvy
- Commune
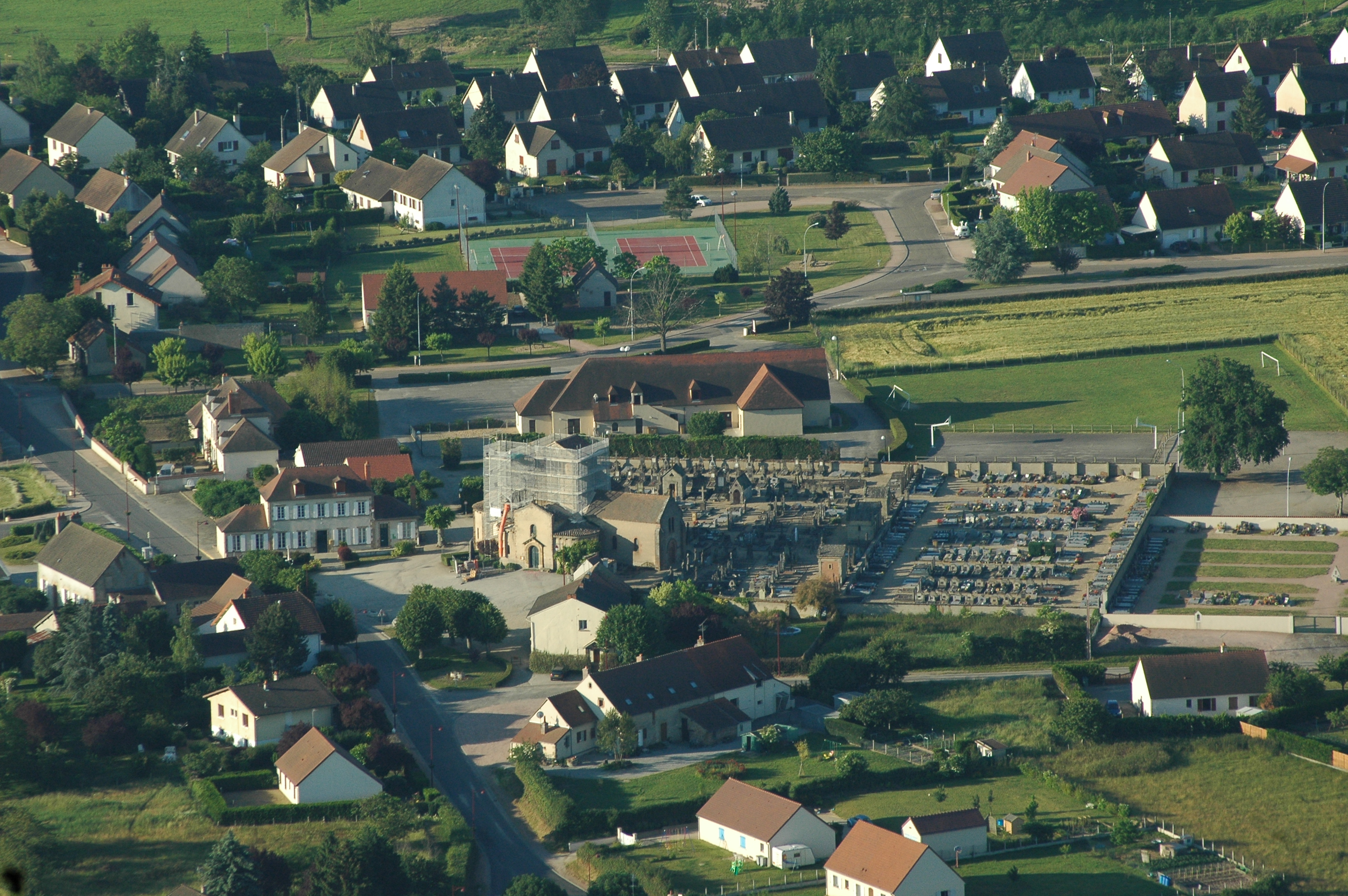
- An aerial view of Neuvy

- Coat of arms
- Location of Neuvy
- Location within France Location within Auvergne-Rhône-Alpes
- Coordinates: 46°33′46″N 3°17′28″E
- Country: France
- Region: Auvergne-Rhône-Alpes
- Department: Allier
- Arrondissement: Moulins
- Canton: Moulins-1
- Intercommunality: CA Moulins Communauté

Government
  - Mayor (2026–32): Philippe Boismenu
- Area^{1}: 19.03 km^{2} (7.35 sq mi)
- Elevation: 251 m (823 ft)
- Highest elevation: 263 m (863 ft)
- Lowest elevation: 200 m (660 ft)
- Population (2023): 1,475
  - Density: 77.51/km^{2} (200.7/sq mi)
- Time zone: UTC+01:00 (CET)
  - Summer (DST): UTC+02:00 (CEST)
- INSEE/Postal code: 03200 /03000
- ^{1} French Land Register data, which excludes lakes, ponds, glaciers > 1 km^{2} (0.386 sq mi or 247 acres) and river estuaries.

Neuvy (French pronunciation: [nøvi]) is a commune in the Allier department in Auvergne-Rhône-Alpes in central France.

== Population ==
Historical population
Year	Pop.	±% p.a.
1968	882	—
1975	1,026	+2.18%
1982	1,440	+4.96%
1990	1,563	+1.03%
1999	1,496	−0.49%
2007	1,635	+1.12%
2012	1,530	−1.32%
2017	1,595	+0.84%
2023	1,475	−1.30%
Source: INSEE

== See also ==
- Communes of the Allier department
