= Louis-Eugène Bion =

French sculptor (1807–1860)

- Born: 12 April 1807; Paris, France
- Died: 21 January 1860 (aged 52); Versailles, France
- Occupation: Sculptor
- Years active: 19th century

Louis-Eugène Bion (1807–1860) was a French sculptor.

== Biography ==
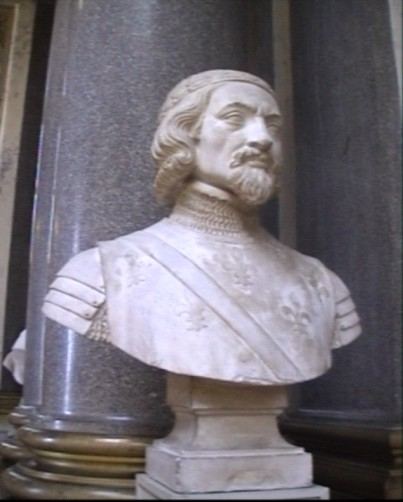
Peter I, Duke of Bourbon, by Louis-Eugène Bion, Galerie des batailles at the château de Versailles.

Louis-Eugène Bion was born on 12 April 1807 in Paris. He studied sculpture under Charles Dupaty and Antoine Desboeufs, and won the third Prix de Rome in 1830. He subsequently specialised in religious sculpture. He died on 21 January 1860 in Versailles.

== Selected works ==
- La Poésie chrétienne
- Saint Vincent de Paul
- Sainte Famille
- Saint Jean l'Évangéliste
- Chaire, Église de Brou
- Le Pape Alexandre II distribuant de l'eau bénite, Church Saint-Eustache of Paris
