= Margaret of Bourbon =

Margaret of Bourbon or Marguerite de Bourbon may refer to:

- Margaret of Bourbon, Queen of Navarre (c. 1217 – 1256), Queen of Navarre from 1232 to 1253 as the third wife of Theobald I of Navarre; regent for three years following his death
- Margaret of Clermont (1289–1309), daughter of Robert, Count of Clermont and Beatrice of Burgundy, Lady of Bourbon; wife of Raymond Berengar, Count of Andria and John I, Marquis of Namur
- Margaret of Bourbon (1313–1362), daughter of Louis I, Duke of Bourbon and Mary of Avesnes; wife of Jean II, sire of Sully and Hutin de Vermeilles
- Margaret of Bourbon, Lady of Albret (1344–1416), daughter of Peter I, Duke of Bourbon and Isabella of Valois, Duchess of Bourbon; wife of Arnaud Amanieu, Lord of Albret
- Margaret of Bourbon (1438–1483), daughter of Charles I, Duke of Bourbon and Agnes of Burgundy, Duchess of Bourbon; wife of Philip II, Duke of Savoy
- Margaret of Bourbon (1516–1559), daughter of Charles, Duke of Vendôme and Françoise d'Alençon; wife of Francis I, Duke of Nevers
- Marguerite de Bourbon (b. 1556), daughter of Louis I, Prince of Condé and Éléonore de Roye; died young
- Princess Margherita of Bourbon-Parma (1847-1893), daughter of Charles III, Duke of Parma and Princess Louise d'Artois; wife of Infante Carlos, Duke of Madrid
- Infanta Margarita, Duchess of Soria (b. 1939), daughter of Infante Juan, Count of Barcelona and Princess María de las Mercedes of Bourbon-Two Sicilies; wife of Carlos Zurita, Duke of Soria
- Princess Margarita de Bourbon de Parme (b. 1972), daughter of Carlos Hugo, Duke of Parma and Princess Irene of the Netherlands
