= Louis I, Count of Montpensier =

French noble (1405–1486)

- Coat-of-arms of Louis I, Count of Montpensier after 1428.
- Born: 1405
- Died: May 1486 (aged 80–81); Rome
- Noble family: Bourbon-Montpensier
- Spouses: Joanna, Dauphine of Auvergne; Gabrielle de La Tour d'Auvergne
- Issue: Gilbert, Count of Montpensier; John; Gabrielle de Bourbon; Charlotte
- Father: John I, Duke of Bourbon
- Mother: Marie, Duchess of Auvergne

Louis de Bourbon (1405 – May 1486) was the third son of John I, Duke of Bourbon and Marie, Duchess of Auvergne. He was Count of Montpensier, Clermont-en-Auvergne and Sancerre and Dauphin of Auvergne and was a younger brother of Charles I of Bourbon. He founded the Bourbon-Montpensier branch of the House of Bourbon, which would eventually take over the Duchy in 1505.

== Family ==
Coat-of-arms of Louis before 1428.

In 1428, Louis married Joanna, Dauphine of Auvergne, daughter and heiress of Beraud III, Dauphin of Auvergne and Count of Clermont-en-Auvergne. After her death in 1436, he retained those titles (his paternal grandmother having been Anne of Auvergne, daughter of Dauphin Beraud II). On 5 February 1442, he married Gabrielle de La Tour d'Auvergne, daughter of Bertrand V of La Tour, count of Auvergne and Boulogne, and Jacquette of Peschin. The couple had four children:

- Gilbert, Count of Montpensier (1443–1496)
- John (1445–1485)
- Gabrielle de Bourbon (1447–1516), Countess of Benon, married in 1485 Louis de la Tremoille, Prince of Talmond
- Charlotte (1449–1478), married in 1468 Wolfert van Borselen, Count of Grandpré and Earl of Buchan

Louis was succeeded by his son Gilbert.

== See also ==
- Duke of Bourbon

== Sources ==
- Dupont-Pierrart, Nicole (2017). Claire de Gonzague Comtesse de Bourbon-Montpensier (1464-1503): Une princess italienne a la cour de France (in French). Presses Universitaires Septentrion.
- Durand, Yves (2000). Etat et société en France aux XVIIe et XVIIIe siècles: Mélanges offerts à (in French). Presses de l'Universite de Paris-Sorbonne.
- Manry, André-Georges (1974). Histoire de l'Auvergne (in French). Privat Editeur.
- Ward, A.W.; Prothero, G.W.; Leathes, Stanley, eds. (1911). The Cambridge Modern History. Vol. XIII. Cambridge at the University Press.

Louis I, Count of Montpensier Bourbon-Montpensier Born: 1405 Died: May 1486
Preceded by John I	Count of Montpensier; 1428–1486	Succeeded by Gilbert
Preceded by Jeanne	Dauphin d'Auvergne; Count of Clermont-en-Auvergne; 1428–1486; With: Jeanne 1428–1436	Succeeded by Gilbert
