= Gabrielle de Bourbon =

French noblewoman and author

- Princess
- Full name: Gabrielle de Bourbon-Montpensier
- Born: 1447
- Died: 1516 (aged 68–69); Thouars
- Noble family: House of Bourbon
- Spouse: Louis II de la Trémoille
- Father: Louis I, Count of Montpensier
- Mother: Gabrielle de La Tour d'Auvergne

Gabrielle de Bourbon or Gabrielle de Bourbon-Montpensier (c. 1447 – 30 November 1516), princess of Talmont, was a French author and daughter of the House of Bourbon.

== Biography ==
Gabrielle was the oldest daughter of Louis I, Count of Montpensier and Gabrielle de La Tour d'Auvergne.

Anne of France proposed a marriage between Gabrielle and Louis II de la Trémoille to tie him to one of her cousins, a descendant of St. Louis like herself. The marriage contract was signed at the castle at Thouars on July 28, 1484. Fearing a trap, Louis II de La Trémoille went to Auvergne to meet his future spouse himself. He fell for Gabrielle's charms and married her. The couple first lived in the castle at Bommiers. After the birth of their son, Charles (April 1485 – September 15, 1515), the couple moved to the family home at the castle in Thouars. The month the child was born, King Charles VIII agreed to be the godfather, bestowing his name on their son.

During the thirty years of her marriage, Gabrielle de Bourbon often found herself representing the La Trémoille family on her own.

Her many letters, as well as the inventory of her possessions, show her personality, as well as her preoccupation with keeping her domain running smoothly.

She died on November 30, 1516, and was buried in the chapel of Our Lady in Thouars beside her only son.

The inventory of her possessions, conserved in the charters of Thouars, reveals a collection of 70 paintings and 18 printed books.

== Marriage ==
Gabrielle and Louis had:

- Charles de La Trémoille, who married Louise de Coëtivy, daughter of Charles de Coëtivy, Count of Taillebourg, and Jeanne d'Orléans. They had a son in 1505: Francis II de La Trémoille.

== Sources ==
- Dupont-Pierrart, Nicole (2017). Claire de Gonzague Comtesse de Bourbon-Montpensier (1464–1503): Une princess italienne a la cour de France (in French). Presses Universitaires Septentrion.
- Weary, William A. (1977). "The House of La Tremoille, Fifteenth through Eighteenth Centuries: Change and Adaptation in a French Noble Family". The Journal of Modern History. 49 (1, On Demand Supplement (Mar.)): D1001–D1038.

== Connected Articles ==
- La Trémoille family
