= Blanche of Bourbon =

Queen of Castile and León from 1353 to 1361

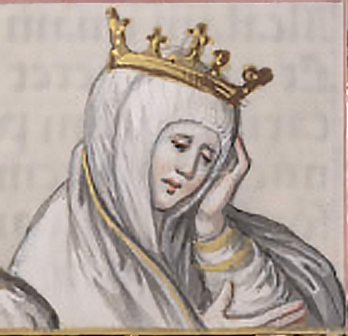

Queen consort of Castile and León
- Tenure: 1353–1361
- Born: 1339
- Died: 1361 (aged 21–22); Medina Sidonia
- Spouse: Peter of Castile
- House: House of Bourbon
- Father: Peter I, Duke of Bourbon
- Mother: Isabella of Valois

Blanche of Bourbon (1339–1361) was Queen consort of Castile as the wife of King Peter of Castile. She married Peter in 1353, but he abandoned her for his mistress, Maria. Blanche spent her remaining years imprisoned in Arévalo, Alcázar of Toledo and finally Medina Sidonia. She died in 1361; her cause of death is disputed.

== Life ==
Born in 1339, Blanche was the daughter of Peter I, Duke of Bourbon and Isabella of Valois. In 1352, two Castilian envoys arrived at the French court seeking a marriage contract between Blanche and King Peter of Castile. Their proposal was accepted. Blanche's familial relationship as a niece of King Philip IV of France and cousin to the current King John II were seen as advantageous by the cortes in Valladolid.

A key provision of the contract involved the dowry for Blanche which was set at 300,000 gold florins. Of this amount, 25,000 would be paid upon her arrival in Castile, another 25,000 on the first Christmas, and 50,000 on each of the following five Christmases. Among the properties Blanche was to acquire in Castile were Arévalo, Sepúlveda, Coca, and Mayorga. The agreement also stated that the assets would return to the Crown in the event that Blanche died without leaving an heir. If she died without incident, the contract would be void, and Peter would have to repay the dowry in accordance with the terms under which it was paid.

On 4 November 1352, Peter signed the marriage contract, while marriage preparations were put into place. Blanche did not leave for Castile until early January. The Viscount of Narbonne and other notable knights from her homeland accompanied Blanche. Her trunk collection, which included twelve trunks, six baskets coated in leather, and numerous other containers, was praised for being exquisite and luxurious. The most extravagant items included a 3200 escudos gold crown covered in gems; a tiara made of gold containing twelve rubies, twenty emeralds, sixteen diamonds, and forty large pearls valued at 2560 Libras; religious items and gold and silver table service; dresses made of gold cloth, silk, and wool from Brussels; elaborate hats; eighteen pairs of gloves and three dozen pairs of shoes; and plumes and furs for adornment. Blanche and her party arrived in Castile on 25 February 1353. She was greeted by Queen mother Maria.

=== Queen ===
Coat of arms of Blanche of Bourbon as Queen Consort of Castile.

On 3 June 1353, (Note: "The ceremony took place in Valladolid; in spite of Ayala's assertion that place June 3, 1353, the exact date is in dispute..") aged 14, Blanche married in person at Valladolid, King Peter of Castile. Previously, on 2 July 1352, the treaty of alliance between France and Castile and the marriage contract were signed, which was ratified five days later in France by King John II. There were many difficulties by the French in getting the money promised as a dowry for Blanche.

Two days after their marriage, Peter abandoned Blanche for Maria de Padilla.

Eventually Blanche was imprisoned in the castle of Arévalo and then in the Alcázar of Toledo. Blanche's cousin, King John II of France, appealed to Pope Innocent VI to have Peter excommunicated for keeping Blanche imprisoned, but the Pope refused. Blanche and Peter had no children.

== Death ==
In 1361, Blanche was transferred to the town of Medina Sidonia, where she was kept distant from possible rescue by the forces from Aragon and France battling King Peter. The Pope advocated for her release.

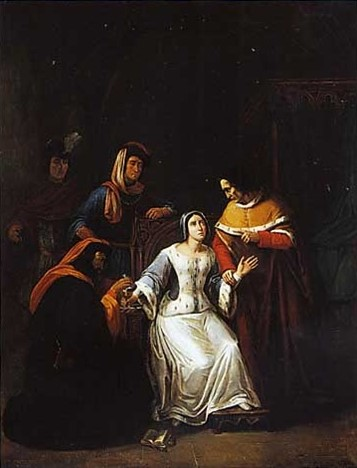
The Poisoning of Blanche of Bourbon, wife of Peter the Cruel, King of Castile, history painting by Louis-Georges Paradis, 1838

In 1361, after Peter had made peace with the King of Aragon, he returned to Seville and hoped to eliminate the last bastions of resistance to his rule. According to Pero López de Ayala, he then instructed Iñigo Ortiz de Estuñiga, who was charged with keeping his wife imprisoned in Medina Sidonia, to kill her. Ayala, who had later joined with a winning faction led by Henry II, states that to Peter's anger, Estuñiga declined because the act was treasonous and likely to cause further disorder in the kingdom. The King demanded that she be handed over to Juan Pérez de Rebolledo of Jerez de la Frontera, a crossbowman of the king, who carried out the execution. However, partisans over the years were to write divergent stories about these events, depending on whether you looked upon him as "the cruel" (el Cruel) or "the purveyor of justice" (el Justiciero). During the 19th century, while Spain was ruled by the Bourbon monarchy, her tomb was provided with the following inscription in Latin:

CHRISTO OPTIMO MAXIMO SACRUM. DIVA BLANCA HISPANIARUM REGINA, PATRE BORBONEO, EX INCLITA FRANCORUM REGUM PROSAPIA, MORIBUS ET CORPORE VENUSTISSIMA FUIT; SED PRAEVALENTE PELLICE OCCUBVIT IUSSU PETRI MARITI CRUDELIS ANNO SALUTIS MCCCLXI. AETATIS VERO SUAE XXV

Sacred to Christ the best and greatest. Blessed Blanche, Queen of Spain, of Bourbon father, from the renowned lineage of the Kings of France, was lovely in manners and body; but, his concubine being favored over her, she lay down here by order of her husband Peter the Cruel in the year of salvation 1361 at the age of 25.

However, whether Peter did have her assassinated is a controversial claim. Zuñiga who amended Ayala's chronicles notes that partisans of the king called it a natural death. Others question such events, since she did not die in Jerez de la Frontera, but in Medina Sidonia as per contemporary accounts. Also different versions of Ayala's chronicles make a different statement, saying that she was poisoned by herbs (le fueron dadas yerbas). This latter statement was also repeated by Juan de Mariana in his history.

It is not surprising that the history of Peter was rewritten in later years. Male descendants of King Henry II, the bastard half-brother of King Peter, and his slayer, would end up marrying female descendants of Peter. Henry III, who was grandson of Henry II, would marry Catherine of Lancaster, the daughter of John of Gaunt, the Duke of Lancaster, and Constance of Castile, daughter of Peter. Thus subsequent descendants of the joined lines would try to ameliorate the iniquity of Peter chronicled by the faction of Henry II. On the other hand, Bourbon rulers had a stake in sanctifying the image of Blanche, a distant member of their ancestral lineage.

== Ancestry ==
Ancestors of Blanche of Bourbon

8. Robert, Count of Clermont
4. Louis I, Duke of Bourbon
9. Beatrix of Bourbon
2. Peter I, Duke of Bourbon
10. John II, Count of Holland
5. Mary of Avesnes
11. Philippa of Luxembourg
1. Blanche of Bourbon
12. Philip III of France
6. Charles of Valois
13. Isabella of Aragon
3. Isabella of Valois
14. Guy IV, Count of Saint-Pol
7. Mahaut of Châtillon
15. Marie of Brittany

== Sources ==
- Estow, Clara (1995). Pedro the Cruel of Castile (1350-1369). Brill.
- Estow, Clara (1996). "Royal Madness in the Crónica del Rey Don Pedro". Mediterranean Studies. 6: 13–28.
- de Ayala, Pero López (2020). Chronicle of King Pedro. Vol. 1–3. Translated by Such, Peter. Liverpool University Press. ISBN 9781800345317.
- Miller, Tanya Stabler (2014). The Beguines of Medieval Paris: Gender, Patronage, and Spiritual Authority. University of Pennsylvania Press. ISBN 9780812209686.
- de Venette, Jean (1953). Newhall, Richard A. (ed.). The Chronicle of Jean de Venette. Translated by Birdsall, Jean. Columbia University Press.
- Hale, Edward Everett, and Susan Hale. The Story of Spain. Story of the nations. New York: G.P. Putnam's Sons, 1886. googlebooks.com Accessed November 16, 2007
- Jones, William H. Blanche de Bourbon, and other poems. London: Hookham and Sons, 1855. googlebooks.com Accessed November 16, 2007

Blanche of Bourbon House of Bourbon Cadet branch of the Capetian dynasty Born: 1339 Died: 1361
Royal titles
Vacant Title last held by Maria of Portugal	Queen consort of Castile and León; 1353–1361	Vacant Title next held by Juana Manuel of Castile
