= Coulandon =

- Commune
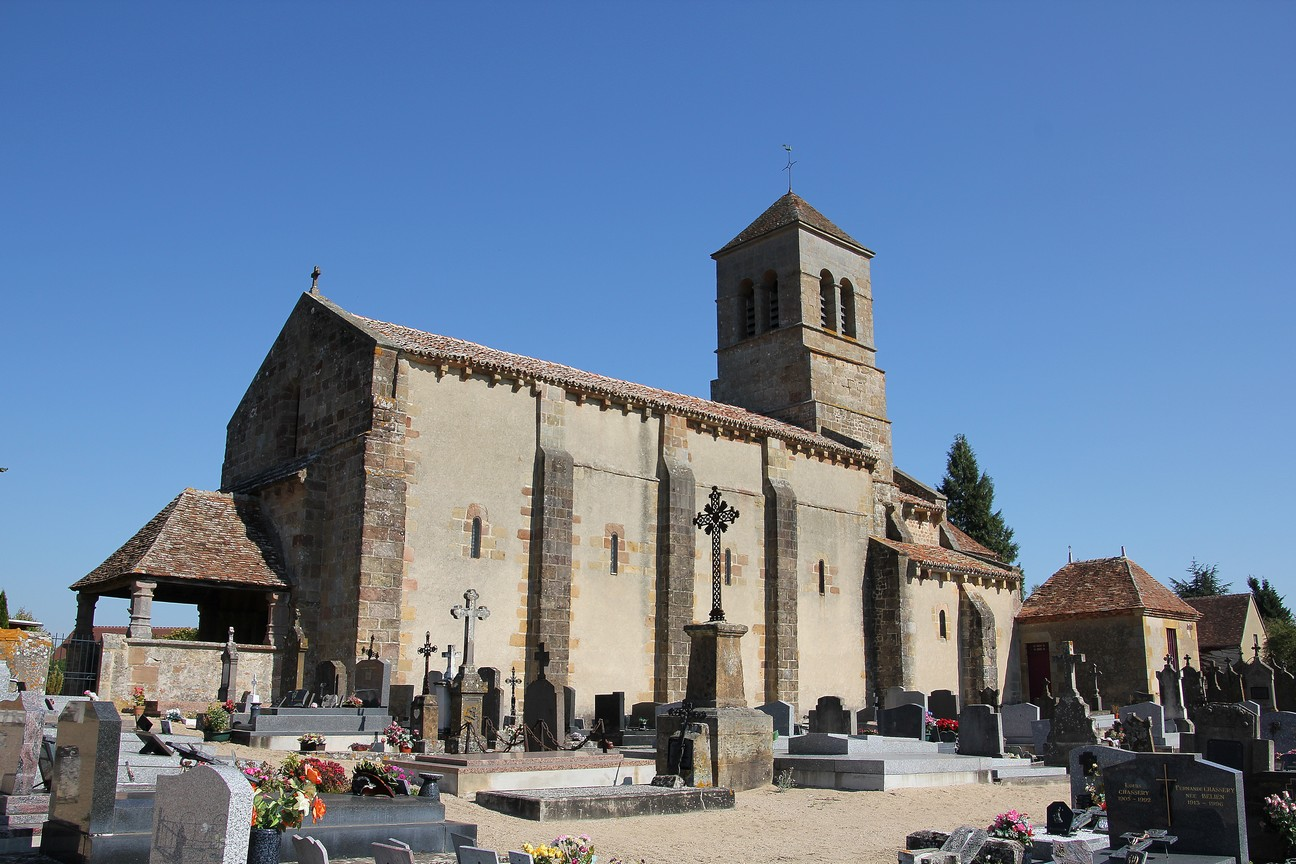
- The church in Coulandon
- Location of Coulandon
- Location within France Location within Auvergne-Rhône-Alpes
- Coordinates: 46°33′05″N 3°15′24″E
- Country: France
- Region: Auvergne-Rhône-Alpes
- Department: Allier
- Arrondissement: Moulins
- Canton: Moulins-1
- Intercommunality: CA Moulins Communauté

Government
  - Mayor (2026–32): Jean-Michel Griffet
- Area^{1}: 17.06 km^{2} (6.59 sq mi)
- Elevation: 226 m (741 ft)
- Highest elevation: 278 m (912 ft)
- Lowest elevation: 212 m (696 ft)
- Population (2023): 645
  - Density: 37.8/km^{2} (97.9/sq mi)
- Time zone: UTC+01:00 (CET)
  - Summer (DST): UTC+02:00 (CEST)
- INSEE/Postal code: 03085 /03000
- ^{1} French Land Register data, which excludes lakes, ponds, glaciers > 1 km^{2} (0.386 sq mi or 247 acres) and river estuaries.

Coulandon (French pronunciation: [kulɑ̃dɔ̃]) is a commune in the Allier department in central France.

== Population ==
Historical population
Year	Pop.	±% p.a.
1968	466	—
1975	494	+0.84%
1982	493	−0.03%
1990	554	+1.47%
1999	594	+0.78%
2007	689	+1.87%
2012	687	−0.06%
2017	650	−1.10%
2023	645	−0.13%
Source: INSEE

== See also ==
- Communes of the Allier department
