= Peter I, Duke of Bourbon =

Duke of Bourbon (1311–1356)

Peter I
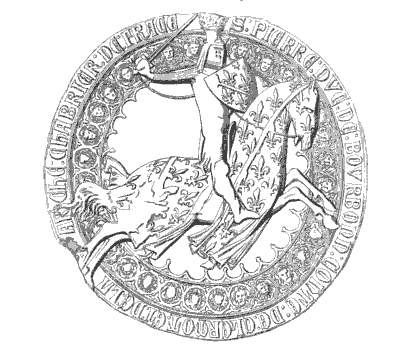
- Seal of Duke Peter

Duke of Bourbon
- Reign: 1341 – 1356
- Predecessor: Louis I
- Successor: Louis II

Count of Clermont-en-Beauvaisis
- Reign: 1341 – 1356
- Predecessor: Louis I
- Successor: Louis II
- Born: 1311
- Died: 19 September 1356 (aged 44–45); Poitiers, France
- Spouse: Isabella of Valois (m. 1336)
- Issue: Louis II, Duke of Bourbon; Joanna, Queen of France; Blanche, Queen of Castile; Bonne, Duchess of Savoy; Margaret of Bourbon
- House: Bourbon
- Father: Louis I, Duke of Bourbon
- Mother: Mary of Avesnes

Peter I of Bourbon (French Pierre Ier, Duc de Bourbon; 1311 – 19 September 1356) was the second Duke of Bourbon, from 1342 to his death. He was the son of Louis I of Bourbon, whom he also succeeded as Grand Chamberlain of France, and Mary of Avesnes.

Peter is reported to have been somewhat mentally unstable, a trait of nervous breakdowns (presumably hereditary, if mental illness is hereditary) that showed clearly for example in his daughter Joan of Bourbon, the queen, and in her son, king Charles VI of France, as well as in Peter's only surviving son, Duke Louis II.

== Early career ==
Peter took part in several of the early campaigns of the Hundred Years War which broke out in 1337. In the summer of 1339, he took part in the failed attack on Bordeaux by Jean de Marigny, Bishop of Beauvais. In autumn 1341, he took part in the campaign in Brittany of John, Duke of Normandy. He was present at the coronation of Pope Clement VI at Avignon on 19 May 1342.

By the summer 1342, Peter together with the Raoul I of Brienne, Count of Eu, was given command of the covering force protecting France from attacks from the north while King Philip VI campaigned in Brittany. In August 1343 he and the Dauphin of Viennois were the French ambassadors at a peace conference at Avignon, but the negotiations were fruitless, as Edward III of England declined to send any but the most junior members of the embassy.

== Lieutenant in Languedoc ==
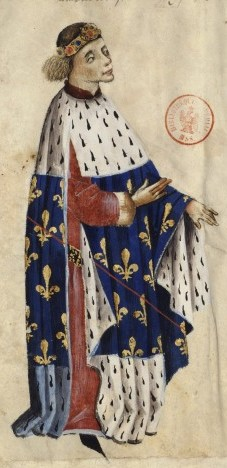
A portrait of Peter from a 15th century Armorial d'Auvergne

On 8 August 1345 Peter was appointed by Philip VI as his lieutenant on the south-west march. His opponent was to be Henry, Earl of Derby (later Earl and Duke of Lancaster), who completed disembarking his army at Bordeaux the day after Peter's appointment.

Peter arrived to take up his lieutenancy in Languedoc in September. By then, the Earl of Derby had already opened his campaign, throwing the French defences into disarray with the capture of Bergerac and the destruction of the French army present there the previous month. Bourbon set up headquarters at Angoulême and begun an extensive recruitment campaign to raise a new army, command of which fell to the Duke of Normandy. However on 21 October the Earl of Derby won another crushing victory outside Auberoche over parts of this force. The Duke of Normandy abandoned his campaign once he heard the news. In early November he disbanded his army and left for the north.

The Earl of Derby exploited the absence of a French commander in the field to lay siege to the important fortress-city of La Réole. Bourbon proclaimed the arrière-ban in Languedoc and the march provinces in an attempt to find troops to relieve the siege. However the results were poor as many of the potential recruits were still on their way home from the army just disbanded by John of Normandy. Attempts by John I, Count of Armagnac, to raise troops from his domains in the Rouergue also produced little. Early January 1346 the garrison of La Réole marched away under truce.

In the winter of 1346, Bourbon kept his winter quarters at the provincial capital of Agen, a city which quickly was becoming isolated as many of the lesser towns were captured or defected to the English. Spring, however, opened with the so far greatest French effort in the south-west. Bourbon and the Bishop of Beauvais raised a new army at Toulouse, in part financed by the Pope whose nephew had been captured by Derby the previous year, while John of Normandy brought with him a substantial number of nobles from the north including such dignitaries as the Eudes IV, Duke of Burgundy, Raoul II of Brienne, Count of Eu, the Constable of France, both Marshals of France and the Master of Crossbowmen. In April, Normandy laid siege to the town of Aiguillon which controlled the confluence of the Lot and the Garonne. There they still remained in August when John of Normandy was urgently recalled to the north to help stop Edward III who had landed in Normandy. Derby exploited this with a devastating autumn campaign. As a result, the French campaign in the south of France in 1346 ended having accomplished nothing.

== Diplomatic missions ==
In July 1347 he took part in fruitless negotiations with the English outside Calais in the days just before that city's capitulation.

On 8 February 1354, Peter was together with the Guy, Cardinal of Boulogne, appointed as King John II's commissioners to King Charles II of Navarre, empowered to offer whatever Charles wanted. The two met the King of Navarre in the castle of Mantes, accompanied by the two dowager Queens and droves of courtiers and ministers, most of whom more or less openly sympathized with Charles of Navarre. The treaty concluded 22 February granted to Charles of Navarre a considerable part of Lower Normandy which he was to hold with the same rights as the Duke of Normandy.

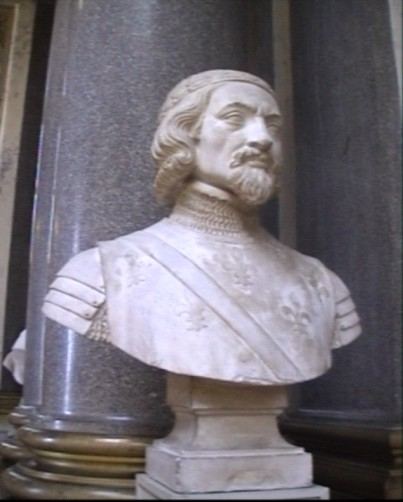
The bust of Peter I, Duke of Bourbon, by sculptor Louis-Eugène Bion. Now in the Galerie des Batailles at the Palace of Versailles

In January 1355, Peter was sent together with the Chancellor of France Pierre de la Forêt on a diplomatic mission to Avignon where they were to meet with an English embassy led by Henry of Lancaster and Richard FitzAlan, 10th Earl of Arundel. The purpose of the mission was to formally ratify a peace treaty based on a draft drawn up at Guînes the previous year. However since then French policy had changed, the French ambassadors had only come to reject the English demands and had nothing new to offer. Negotiations therefore quickly broke down and the conference ended having accomplished nothing except prolonging the existing truce a few more months until 24 June.

In May 1355, when it became apparent that open war was about to break out between the King of France and a King of Navarre allied to England, the Duke of Bourbon belonged to the party fronted by the Dowager Queens who lobbied John II on Charles of Navarre's behalf. In the end, John II gave way and on 31 May agreed to pardon Charles of Navarre.

In July, the Duke of Bourbon and the Chancellor met with English ambassadors to negotiate the extension of the truce. As both the French and English governments had decided to resume the war these negotiations were naturally quite empty and fruitless.

Peter was killed in the Battle of Poitiers on 19 September 1356 and buried in the now-demolished church of the Couvent des Jacobins in Paris.

Honoring his services to France, in the 1830s, King Louis Philippe I commissioned a bust of him to be displayed in the Galerie des Batailles at the Palace of Versailles. The bust was designed by sculptor Louis-Eugène Bion and is now displaying at the Palace.

== Marriage and issue ==
On 25 January 1336 he married Isabella of Valois, daughter of Charles, Count of Valois, and his third wife Mahaut of Châtillon. Peter and Isabella had:

- Louis II (1337–1410)
- Joanna (1338–1378), married King Charles V of France
- Blanche (1339–1361, Medina-Sidonia), married King Pedro of Castile in 1353 in Valladolid, poisoned by her husband
- Bonne (1341 – 19 January 1402, Château de Mâcon), married Amadeus VI, Count of Savoy, in 1355 in Paris
- Catherine (1342–1427, Paris), married John VI of Harcourt
- Margaret (1344–1416), married Arnaud Amanieu, Viscount of Tartas
- Isabelle (1345–1345), died in infancy
- Marie (1347–1401, Poissy), Prioress of Poissy

== Sources ==
- Autrand, Françoise (1994). Charles V (in French). Paris: Fayard. ISBN 978-2213027692.
- Hand, Joni M. (2013). Women, Manuscripts and Identity in Northern Europe, 1350–1550. London: Routledge. ISBN 9781138246515.
- Heers, Jacques (2016). Louis XI. Paris: Tempus Perrin. ISBN 9782262020842.
- Nicolle, David (2004). Poitiers 1356: The Capture of a King. Oxford: Osprey. ISBN 1-84176-516-3.
- Sumption, Jonathan (1991). The Hundred Years War:Trial by Battle. Vol. I. Philadelphia: University of Pennsylvania Press. ISBN 0-8122-1655-5.

Peter I, Duke of Bourbon House of Bourbon Cadet branch of the Capetian dynasty Born: 1311 Died: 19 September 1356
French nobility
Preceded by Louis I	Duke of Bourbon and Count of Clermont-en-Beauvaisis; 1342–1356	Succeeded by Louis II
Preceded by Louis I	Count of La Marche; 1342–1356	Succeeded by James I
