= Jacques-François Baudiau =

Jacques-François Baudiau (15 October 1809, in Planchez – 17 September 1880, in Quarré-les-Tombes) was a French Catholic priest and geographer.

In 1833 he was named vicar in Château-Chinon, then served as a pastor in Montigny-sur-Canne (from November 1834), and later in Dun-les-Places (from July 1844). He was a member of learned societies in Saône-et-Loire, Nièvre and Yonne.

In 1854 he published a two volume work on the geography of the Morvan titled, Le Morvand, ou Essai géographique, topographique et historique sur cette contrée. Its second edition covered three volumes, it being published in 1865–67.
