= Anne of Auvergne =

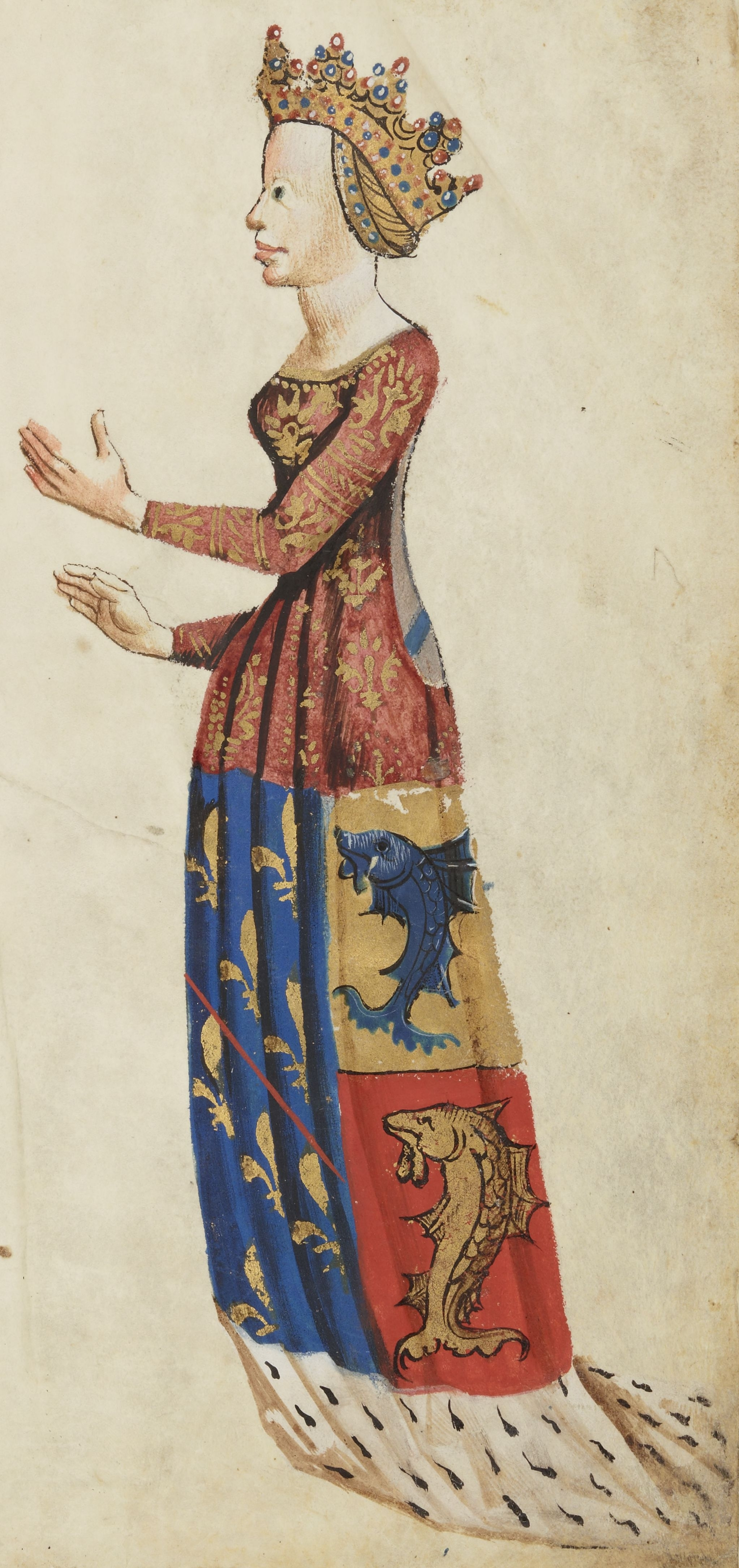

Duchess consort of Bourbon
- Tenure: 1371–1410
- Born: 1358
- Died: 22 September 1417 (aged 58–59); Moulins, Allier
- Spouse: Louis II, Duke of Bourbon (m. 1371; died 1410)
- Issue: Catherine of Bourbon (born 1378); John I, Duke of Bourbon; Louis of Bourbon (1388–1404); Isabelle of Bourbon (1384–1451)
- Father: Beraud II, Dauphin of Auvergne
- Mother: Jeanne d'Ussel

Anne of Auvergne (Note: (French: Anne d'Auvergne, pronounced [an dovɛʁɲ])) (c. 1358 – 22 September 1417) was Duchess of Bourbon from 1371 until 1410 as the wife of Louis II, Duke of Bourbon. She was also Countess of Forez (1372–1417) and sovereign Dauphine of Auvergne (1400–1417) in her own right.

== Biography ==
Anne's mother, Jeanne d'Ussel, died when she was around eleven years old. Her father remarried two more times after her death; she gained several half-siblings from her father's third marriage to Margaret of Sancerre.

=== Duchess of Bourbon ===
Anne was betrothed to her cousin Louis when she was ten years old. The marriage contract was signed at Montbrison on 4 July 1368 and the pair were married in person at Ardes on 19 August 1371. Due to the fact that the couple were cousins, a papal dispensation was required; this was granted to them by the Pope Urban V on 15 September 1370.

=== Countess of Forez ===
On 15 May 1372, Anne's uncle, John Count of Forez, died leaving no children. Anne was his heir, as all of John's siblings had died including Anne's mother Jeanne and she had been the only one to leave a child, namely Anne. At the time of her accession, Anne was still only a minor (aged fourteen) so her grandmother, Joan of Clermont, acted as regent until Anne reached her majority, at which time she ruled together with Louis.

=== Dauphine of Auvergne ===
In 1400, Anne's father died and he left her the Dauphinate of Auvergne, which she ruled over for the next seventeen years. Anne also founded an anniversary for her stepmother Margaret. Ten years after the death of her father, Anne was widowed; her husband, Louis, died in 1410 at Montluçon and their older son John succeeded him as duke. Anne ruled over her Dauphinate for another seven years, until her own death at Moulins on 22 September 1417. She was outlived by her son John and daughter Isabelle; her son inherited Forez and her grandson, Louis I, Count of Montpensier, eventually inherited the Dauphinate.

== Issue ==
1. Catherine of Bourbon (b. 1378), d. young
2. John of Bourbon (1381–1434), Duke of Bourbon
3. Louis of Bourbon (1388 – 1404), Sieur de Beaujeu
4. Isabelle of Bourbon (1384 – aft. 1451), engaged to Eric of Pomerania but eventually became a nun.

Of their four children, John and Isabelle reached adulthood; only John having had children of his own.

== Sources ==
- Hirschbiegel, Jan (2014). Étrennes: Untersuchungen zum höfischen Geschenkverkehr im spätmittelalterlichen Frankreich zur Zeit König Karls VI. (1380-1422) (in German). De Gruyter.
- Dominique Laurent, «Anne Dauphine, duchesse de Bourbon, comtesse de Forez et dame de Beaujeu», in Forez et Bourbon. Les ducs de Bourbon, maîtres du Forez aux XIVe et XVe siècles, Actes du colloque de Montbrison du 23 octobre 2010, sous la direction d'Olivier Troubat et Christophe Mathevot, Montbrison, La Diana, 2011 (ISBN 978-2-911623-23-3), pp. 25–39.

Anne of Auvergne House of Auvergne Born: 1358 Died: 22 September 1417
French nobility
Preceded by John II	Countess of Forez; 15 May 1372 – 22 September 1417 with Louis II	Succeeded by John I/III
Preceded by Beraud II	Dauphine of Auvergne; 1400 – 22 September 1417	Succeeded by John I/III
