= Aubigny, Allier =

Aubigny
- Commune
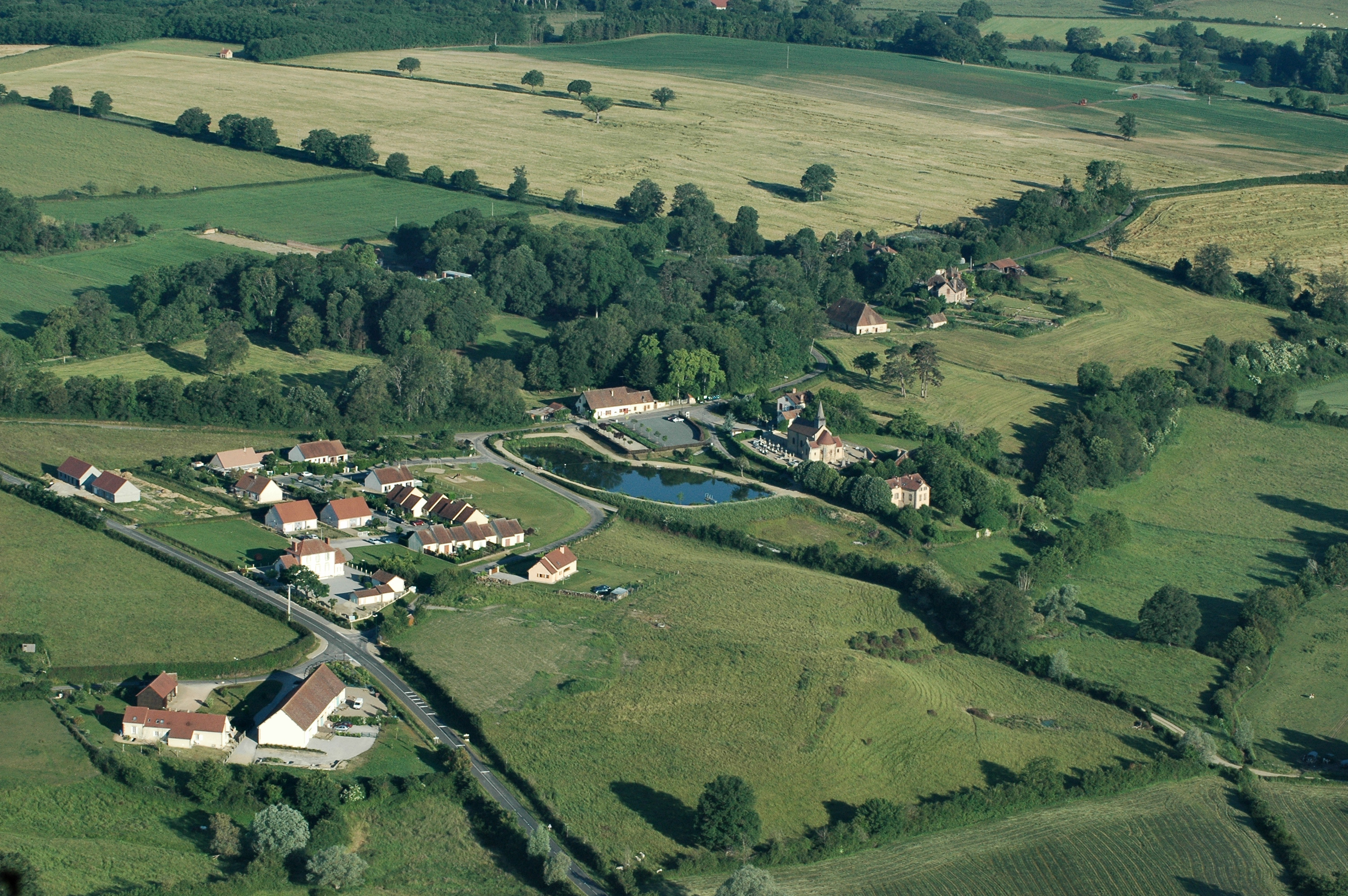
- An aerial view of Aubigny

- Coat of arms
- Location of Aubigny
- Location within France Location within Auvergne-Rhône-Alpes
- Coordinates: 46°40′59″N 3°10′01″E
- Country: France
- Region: Auvergne-Rhône-Alpes
- Department: Allier
- Arrondissement: Moulins
- Canton: Moulins-1
- Intercommunality: CA Moulins Communauté

Government
  - Mayor (2026–32): Laëtitia Ponsard
- Area^{1}: 17.14 km^{2} (6.62 sq mi)
- Elevation: 219 m (719 ft)
- Highest elevation: 255 m (837 ft)
- Lowest elevation: 189 m (620 ft)
- Population (2023): 146
  - Density: 8.52/km^{2} (22.1/sq mi)
- Time zone: UTC+01:00 (CET)
  - Summer (DST): UTC+02:00 (CEST)
- INSEE/Postal code: 03009 /03460
- ^{1} French Land Register data, which excludes lakes, ponds, glaciers > 1 km^{2} (0.386 sq mi or 247 acres) and river estuaries.

Aubigny (French pronunciation: [obiɲi]) is a commune of the Allier department in central France.

== Population ==
Historical population
| Year | Pop. | ±% p.a. |
|---|---|---|
| 1968 | 151 | — |
| 1975 | 131 | −2.01% |
| 1982 | 100 | −3.78% |
| 1990 | 101 | +0.12% |
| 1999 | 103 | +0.22% |
| 2007 | 118 | +1.71% |
| 2012 | 143 | +3.92% |
| 2017 | 139 | −0.57% |
| 2023 | 146 | +0.82% |
Source: INSEE

== Administration ==
- 2008–2014: Michel Brunol
- 2014–2026: Étienne Richet
- 2026–current: Laëtitia Ponsard

== See also ==
- Communes of the Allier department
