= Belleperche Castle =

Coordinates: 46.6423°N 3.2198°E

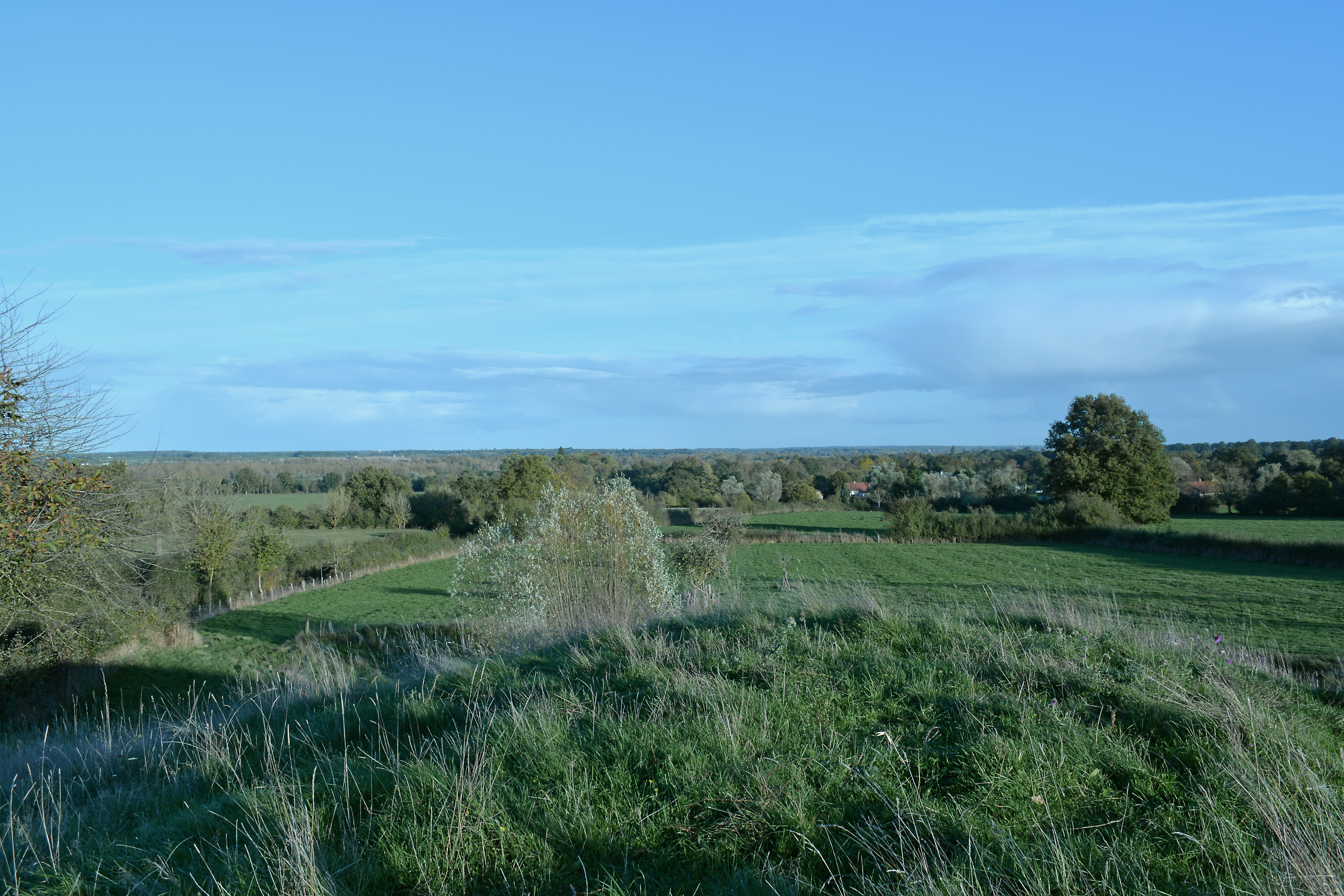
Site of Belleperche Castle.

Belleperche was a castle, now destroyed, located in the current town of Bagneux (Allier). It was the seat of one of the castellany of Bourbonnais.

Belleperche was the scene of an important episode of the Hundred Years War, when Louis II, Duke of Bourbon, sieged the fortress to try to deliver his mother, Isabelle de Valois, held captive by a company of Gascon brigands and mercenaries.

== History ==
=== The Siege of Belleperche (1369-1370) ===
During the summer or autumn of 1369, a small group of about 30 Gascon "Free Company" mercenaries in the employ of the English, managed to seize the castle by trickery, where the dowager duchess of Bourbon, Isabella of Valois, Duchess of Bourbon, lived. "Free Company" units at this time were mercenaries who when not employed took to brigandry. Her son-in-law, Louis II, who was then at the court, hastened, assembled troops, and laid siege to Belleperche. The siege lasted three months; the Duke had four great siege engines put in, which sent stones night and day to the fortress, doing great damage. Frossart tells us that the siege redoubt was "as strong and as well fortified as a good town might have been". But a troop of Poitiers and Aquitaine "Free Company" roadmen commanded by two English princes, the Earl of Cambridge, son of King Edward III, and the Earl of Pembroke came to the aid of the besieged and delayed the capture of the castle. Louis II finally succeeded in taking Belleperche, but could not prevent the truckers, Bernardon de la Salle, Bernard de Wisk and Hortingo de la Salle from escaping by taking the duchess hostage; she was not released until two years later for ransom. This episode greatly contributed to the glory of the duke.
