= Montilly =

- Commune
- Coat of arms
- Location of Montilly
- Location within France Location within Auvergne-Rhône-Alpes
- Coordinates: 46°36′47″N 3°15′09″E
- Country: France
- Region: Auvergne-Rhône-Alpes
- Department: Allier
- Arrondissement: Moulins
- Canton: Moulins-1
- Intercommunality: CA Moulins Communauté

Government
  - Mayor (2026–32): Didier Pinet
- Area^{1}: 22.09 km^{2} (8.53 sq mi)
- Elevation: 208 m (682 ft)
- Highest elevation: 264 m (866 ft)
- Lowest elevation: 197 m (646 ft)
- Population (2023): 488
  - Density: 22.1/km^{2} (57.2/sq mi)
- Time zone: UTC+01:00 (CET)
  - Summer (DST): UTC+02:00 (CEST)
- INSEE/Postal code: 03184 /03000
- ^{1} French Land Register data, which excludes lakes, ponds, glaciers > 1 km^{2} (0.386 sq mi or 247 acres) and river estuaries.

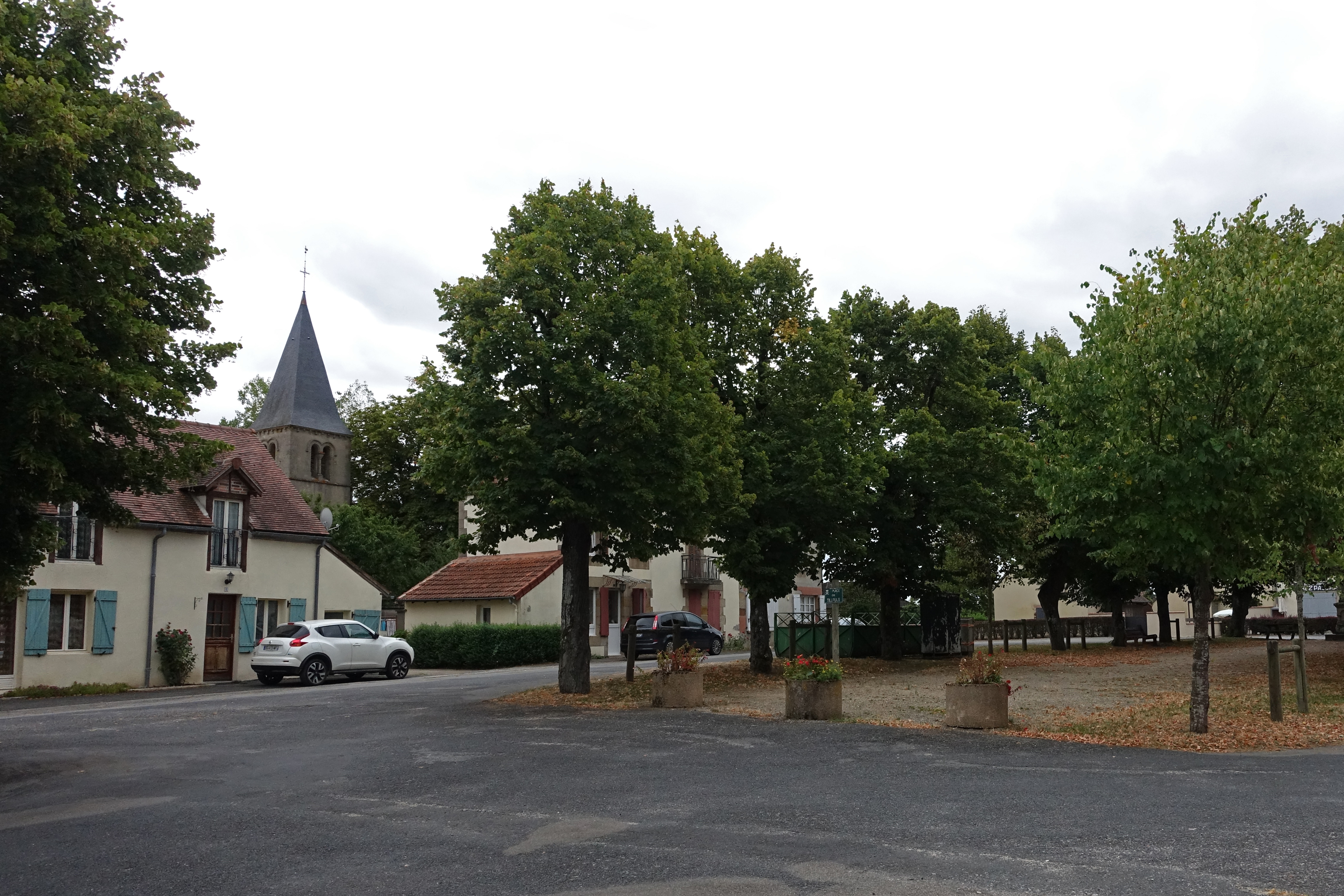
Place des tilleuls, Montilly

Montilly (French pronunciation: [mɔ̃tiji]) is a commune in the Allier department in central France.

== Population ==
Historical population
Year	Pop.	±% p.a.
1968	466	—
1975	456	−0.31%
1982	529	+2.14%
1990	528	−0.02%
1999	509	−0.41%
2007	541	+0.77%
2012	538	−0.11%
2017	508	−1.14%
2023	488	−0.67%
Source: INSEE

== See also ==
- Communes of the Allier department
