= John I, Duke of Bourbon =

Duke of Bourbon and Auvergne

John I
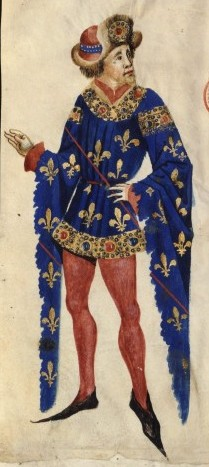
- 15th-century portrait of John

Duke of Bourbon
- Tenure: 10 August 1410 – 5 February 1434
- Predecessor: Louis II
- Successor: Charles I
- Born: 1381
- Died: 1434 (aged 52–53); London
- Spouse: Marie, Duchess of Auvergne (m. 1401)
- Issue: Charles de Bourbon; Louis of Bourbon; Louis de Bourbon
- House: Bourbon
- Father: Louis II, Duke of Bourbon
- Mother: Anne of Auvergne

John of Bourbon (1381–1434) was Duke of Bourbon from 1410 and Duke of Auvergne from 1416 until his death. He was the eldest son of Louis II and Anne of Auvergne. Through his mother, John inherited the County of Forez.

During the Armagnac–Burgundian Civil War, he took sides against the Burgundians and formed the League of Gien with other French nobles. John was captured at the Battle of Agincourt and died as a prisoner in London, in spite of the payment of several ransoms and promises to support the King of England as King of France.

== Marriage and issue ==
In 1400 in Paris, he married Marie, Duchess of Auvergne, daughter of John, Duke of Berry, who inherited the Auvergne title from her father. They had:

- Charles de Bourbon (1401–1456), Duke of Bourbon, succeeded John.
- Louis of Bourbon (1403–1412, Paris), Count of Forez.
- Louis de Bourbon (1405–1486), Count of Montpensier.

In addition, he had two illegitimate children:

- Margaret, married to Rodrigo de Villandrando. (Note: Vale states Villandrando was married to a bastard daughter of the Duke of Bourbon.)
- John of Bourbon, bishop of Puy.

== Sources ==
- Bennett, Michael (1991). Agincourt 1415: triumph against the odds. Osprey Publishing.
- Heers, Jacques (2016). Louis XI. Perrin.
- Ramsey, Ann W. (1999). Liturgy, Politics, and Salvation: The Catholic League in Paris and the Nature of Catholic Reform, 1540-1630. University of Rochester Press.
- Vale, Malcolm Graham Allan (1974). Charles the Seventh. University of California Press.

French nobility
Preceded by Louis II	Duke of Bourbon; 1410–1434	Succeeded by Charles I
Preceded by Louis II	Count of Clermont-en-Beauvaisis; 1400–1424	Succeeded by Charles I
Preceded by Louis II; Anne of Auvergne	Count of Forez; 1410–1434	Succeeded by Charles I
Preceded by John	Duke of Auvergne; 1416–1434 with Marie	Succeeded by Charles I
Preceded by John	Count of Montpensier; 1416–1434 with Marie	Succeeded by Louis I
Preceded by Jourdain VI	Count of L'Isle-Jourdain; 1405–1421	Succeeded by John IV
