= Louis II, Duke of Bourbon =

Duke of Bourbon (c. 1337–1410)

Louis II
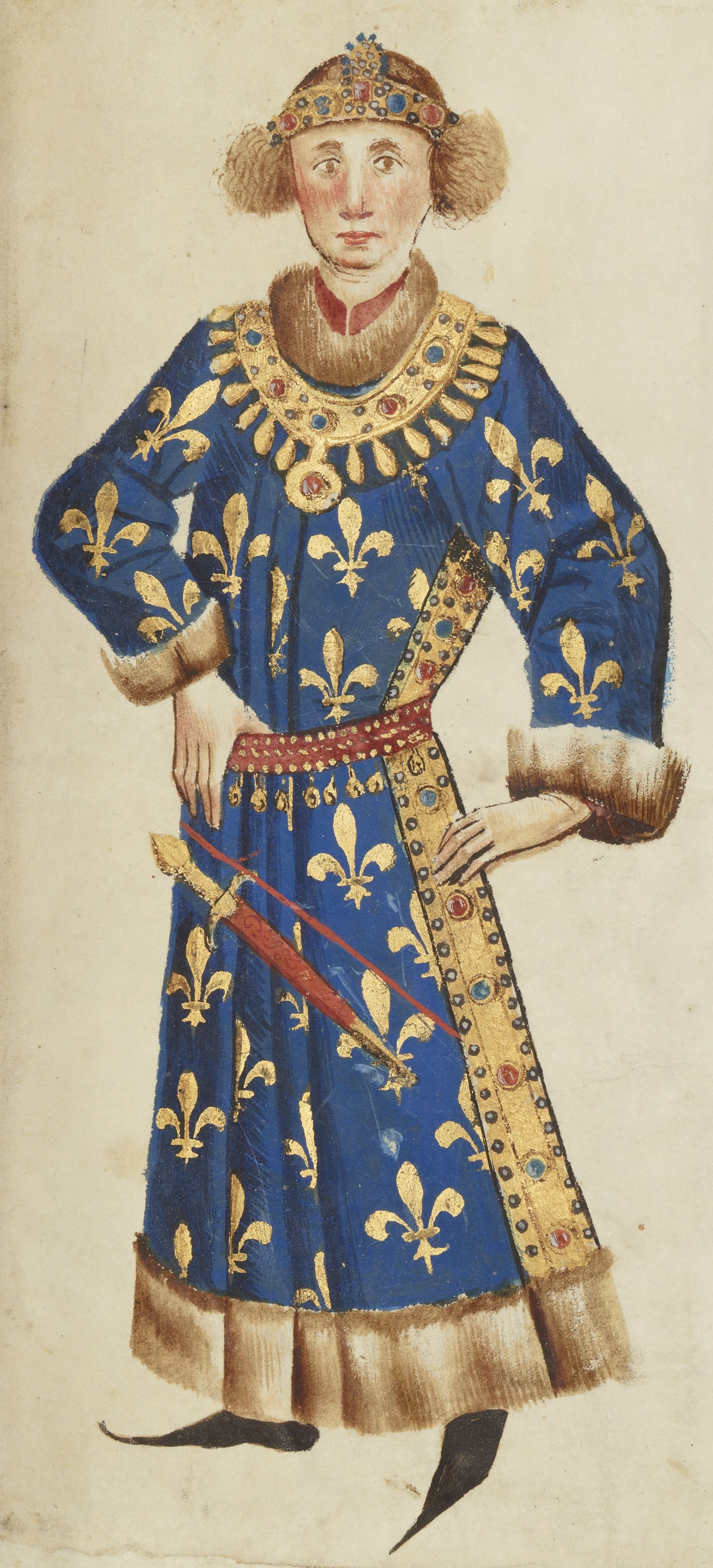
- 15th-century portrait of Louis II

Duke of Bourbon
- Reign: 19 September 1356 – 10 August 1410
- Predecessor: Peter I
- Successor: John I
- Born: 1337
- Died: 10 August 1410 (aged 73); Montluçon
- Spouse: Anne of Auvergne (m. 1371)
- Issue: John I, Duke of Bourbon
- House: Bourbon
- Father: Peter I, Duke of Bourbon
- Mother: Isabella of Valois

Louis de Bourbon, called the Good (c. 1337 – 10 August 1410), was the third Duke of Bourbon and a prince of the blood. He was also the Count of Clermont-en-Beauvaisis, Lord of Beaujeu and Grand Chamberman of France between 1357 and 1410.

== Life ==
His coat-of-arms.

Louis was the son of Peter I, Duke of Bourbon, and Isabella of Valois. His mother was the sister to King Philip VI of France. Although he had mental illnesses, he was still active in politics and wars. In his youth, he was a loyal subject to King John II of France. He inherited the duchy when his father was killed at the Battle of Poitiers in 1356, when King John was captured by the English. In 1360, he volunteered and was sent to England among other high-ranking nobles as a hostage for the ransom of King John II, and was released in 1367.

During the reign of King Charles V, he proved himself to be a competent commander when he led the royal armies in Poitou and Guyenne to recapture the lands lost to the English following the Treaty of Brétigny in 1360. He followed the advises of Constable Bertrand du Guesclin, in avoiding large battles with the English until the French gain sufficient advantage. He started skirmishes and captured many strongholds in Limoges, Brittany and Guyenne. In 1371, he captured Limoges with John, Duke of Berry, brother of King Charles V. In 1374, he captured the strongholds in Rouergue, Poitou and Touraine and re-captured Bigorre and La Réole with Louis I, Duke of Anjou.

Afterwards, he fought against the bands of routiers roaming and devastating France and then was sent to Normandy by King Charles V to fight against King Charles II of Navarre, where he captured some strongholds.

In 1380, following the death of King Charles V and the accession of King Charles VI at a minor age, he became one of the regents of France with other princes of the blood until he was dismissed by King Charles VI at 1388, and e fought against the English in Guyenne until the French and the English signed the Truce of Leulinghem in 1389. He played an important role in politics following the start of King Charles VI's mental illness in 1392.

In 1390, Louis launched the Barbary Crusade against the Hafsids of Tunis, in conjunction with the Genoese. Its objective was to suppress piracy based in the city of Mahdia, but the siege was unsuccessful.

During the reign of King Charles VI, princes of the blood competed for the royal treasury and the power. For a long time, Philip the Bold, Duke of Burgundy, had been an effective ruler of France, negotiating with the English and was building his strong Burgundian State. Gradually, the Duke of Bourbon's nephew, Louis I, Duke of Orléans, brother of King Charles VI, was gaining power, he supported the Duke of Orléans against Philip and his son, John the Fearless. As relations intensified, John the Fearless, with popular support from the population of Paris and northern France with manipulation such as promises to lower taxes, murdered the Duke of Orléans in 1407 in the capital. The Duke of Bourbon was bereft and retreated to his estates. Nevertheless, his son and heir, John of Bourbon, supported the factions of Charles, son of the murdered Duke of Orléans, and formed and became one of the leaders of the Armagnac faction when Charles married Bonne of Armagnac in 1410.

Before his death in 1410, Louis was invited by the emisaries of Charles I, Duke of Orléans, on their cause in the Armagnac–Burgundian Civil War. However, he refused and said "You're a fool. You cannot imagine what it is to embark upon a civil war. These things are quickly begun, but they are slow to heal". Louis died at Montluçon on 10 August 1410 at the age of 73.

== Marriage and issue ==
On 19 August 1371 Louis married Anne of Auvergne, (1358–1417), Countess of Forez, and daughter of Beraud II, Dauphin of Auvergne, and his wife the Countess of Forez. They had:

1. Catherine of Bourbon (b. 1378), died young.
2. John of Bourbon (1381–1434, London), succeeded him as Duke of Bourbon, captured by the English at the Battle of Agincourt and spent the rest of his life in English captivity.
3. Louis of Bourbon (1388 – 1404), Sieur de Beaujeu
4. Isabelle of Bourbon (1384 – aft. 1451)

== Sources ==
- Heers, Jacques (2016). Louis XI. Perrin.
- Ramsey, Ann W. (1999). Liturgy, Politics, and Salvation: The Catholic League in Paris and the Nature of Catholic Reform, 1540-1630. University of Rochester Press.
- Housley, Norman (1992). The later Crusades, 1274-1580: from Lyons to Alcazar. Oxford University Press.
- Roux, Simone (2009). Paris in the Middle Ages. Translated by McNamara, Jo Ann. University of Pennsylvania Press.

French nobility
Preceded by John II	Count of Forez; 1372–1410 with Anna	Succeeded by John I/III
Preceded by Peter I	Duke of Bourbon; 1356–1410	Succeeded by John I/III
Preceded by Peter I	Count of Clermont-en-Beauvaisis; 1371–1400	Succeeded by John I/III
